= 2005 in literature =

This article contains information about the literary events and publications of 2005.

== Events ==
- February 25 – Canada Reads selects Rockbound by Frank Parker Day as the novel to be read across the nation.
- March 26 – The classic U.K. science fiction series Doctor Who returns to television with a script by Russell T Davies, the executive producer.
- April 23 – The Grande Bibliothèque at the Bibliothèque et Archives nationales du Québec is officially opened. It actually opens on April 30.
- June 13 – The poet Dannie Abse is injured and his wife Joan killed in an accident on the M4 in South Wales.
- August 15 – An integrated National Library of Norway opens to readers in Oslo for the first time.

== New books ==
=== Fiction ===
- Tariq Ali – A Sultan in Palermo
- Rajaa Alsanea – Girls of Riyadh (بنات الرياض, Banat al-Riyadh)
- Avi – Never Mind
- Tash Aw – The Harmony Silk Factory
- Steve Aylett – Lint
- Doreen Baingana – Tropical Fish (short stories)
- John Banville – The Sea
- Sebastian Barry – A Long Long Way
- Nelson Bond – Other Worlds Than Ours
- Dionne Brand – What We All Long For
- Orson Scott Card
  - Magic Street
  - Shadow of the Giant
- Cormac McCarthy – No Country for Old Men
- Rita Chowdhury – Deo Langkhui
- Wendy Coakley-Thompson – What You Won't Do for Love
- Eoin Colfer – Artemis Fowl and the Opal Deception
- Bernard Cornwell – The Pale Horseman
- Colin Cotterill – Thirty-Three Teeth
- Robert Crais – The Forgotten Man
- Mitch Cullin – A Slight Trick of the Mind
- Michael Cunningham – Specimen Days
- Rana Dasgupta – Tokyo Cancelled
- Lindsey Davis – See Delphi and Die
- Abha Dawesar – Babyji
- L. Sprague de Camp – Years in the Making: the Time-Travel Stories of L. Sprague de Camp
- Troy Denning
  - The Joiner King
  - The Swarm War
  - The Unseen Queen
- Bret Easton Ellis – Lunar Park
- Alicia Erian – Towelhead
- Steve Erickson – Our Ecstatic Days
- Sebastian Faulks – Human Traces
- Amanda Filipacchi – Love Creeps
- Jonathan Safran Foer – Extremely Loud & Incredibly Close
- Nicci French – Catch Me When I Fall
- Gayleen Froese – Touch
- Cornelia Funke – Inkspell
- David Gibbins – Atlantis
- Kate Grenville – The Secret River (Melbourne)
- Abdulrazak Gurnah – Desertion
- Margaret Peterson Haddix – Among the Enemy
- Joanne Harris – Gentlemen & Players
- Carl Hiaasen – Flush
- Charlie Higson – SilverFin
- Peter Hobbs – The Short Day Dying
- John Irving – Until I Find You
- Kazuo Ishiguro – Never Let Me Go
- Uzodinma Iweala – Beasts of No Nation
- Raymond Khoury – The Last Templar
- Stephen King – The Colorado Kid
- Dean Koontz – Velocity
- Elizabeth Kostova – The Historian
- Sharon Krum – The Thing About Jane Spring
- Stieg Larsson – The Girl with the Dragon Tattoo
- Marina Lewycka – A Short History of Tractors in Ukrainian
- Yiyun Li – A Thousand Years of Good Prayers (short stories)
- James Luceno
  - Dark Lord: The Rise of Darth Vader
  - Labyrinth of Evil
- Mike McCormack – Notes from a Coma
- Ian McEwan – Saturday
- Elizabeth McKenzie – Stop That Girl
- Kevin MacNeil – The Stornoway Way
- Gregory Maguire – Son of a Witch
- Gabriel García Márquez – Memories of My Melancholy Whores
- Stephenie Meyer – Twilight
- David Michaels – Tom Clancy's Splinter Cell: Operation Barracuda
- Robert Muchamore
  - Maximum Security
  - The Killing
- Péter Nádas – Parallel Stories
- Garth Nix – Drowned Wednesday
- Chuck Palahniuk – Haunted
- Christopher Paolini – Eldest
- Robert B. Parker – School Days
- Ruth Rendell – End in Tears
- Salman Rushdie – Shalimar the Clown
- Darren Shan – Lord Loss (first of The Demonata series)
- Zadie Smith – On Beauty
- Wesley Stace – Misfortune
- Olen Steinhauer – 36 Yalta Boulevard
- Matthew Stover – Star Wars Episode III: Revenge of the Sith
- Thomas Sullivan – Second Soul
- Jean-François Susbielle – La Morsure du dragon
- Vikas Swarup – Q & A
- Rupert Thomson – Divided Kingdom
- Harry Turtledove (editor) – The Enchanter Completed: A Tribute Anthology for L. Sprague de Camp
- Andrew Vachss – Two Trains Running
- Catherynne M. Valente – Yume No Hon: The Book of Dreams
- Michal Viewegh – Lekce tvůrčího psaní
- Narayan Wagle – Palpasa Cafe (पल्पसा क्याफे)
- David Weber – At All Costs
- Samantha Weinberg – The Moneypenny Diaries: Guardian Angel
- Kirby Wright – Punahou Blues
- Markus Zusak – The Book Thief

=== Children and young people ===
- David Almond – Clay
- Charlie Jane Anders – Choir Boy
- Lysa Divine -Drama High
- Jackie French – They Came on Viking Ships
- Jonathon Scott Fuqua – King of the Pygmies
- John Green – Looking for Alaska
- Charlie Higson – SilverFin
- Julius Lester – The Old African
- Claire and Monte Montgomery - Hubert Invents the Wheel
- Jenny Nimmo – Charlie Bone and the Castle of Mirrors
- Jane O'Connor – Fancy Nancy (first in a series of over 70 books)
- Margie Palatini (with Barry Moser) – The Three Silly Billies
- Peter Parnell and Justin Richardson – And Tango Makes Three
- Philip Reeve – Infernal Devices
- Rick Riordan – The Lightning Thief
- J. K. Rowling – Harry Potter and the Half-Blood Prince
- Lemony Snicket – The Penultimate Peril
- Dugald Steer (with Nghiem Ta, etc.) – Wizardology: The Book of the Secrets of Merlin
- Jonathan Stroud – Ptolemy's Gate
- Scott Westerfeld – Uglies (first in the Uglies series of four books)
- Markus Zusak – The Book Thief

=== Drama ===
- Catherine Filloux – Lemkin's House
- debbie tucker green
  - stoning mary
  - generations
- Oleg Kagan – The Black Hat
- Carlos Lacamara – Nowhere on the Border
- Peter Morris – Guardians
- Vern Thiessen – Shakespeare's Will
- Laura Wade
  - Colder Than Here
  - Breathing Corpses
- Vincent Woods – A Cry from Heaven

=== Poetry ===
- Carol Ann Duffy – Rapture

=== Non-fiction ===
- Matthew Bortolin – The Dharma of Star Wars
- Edwin Bryant – Indo-Aryan Controversy: Evidence and inference in Indian history
- Francis Chalifour – After
- Jung Chang & Jon Halliday – Mao: The Unknown Story
- Theodore Dalrymple – Our Culture, What's Left of It: The Mandarins and the Masses
- Michel Déon – Horseman, Pass By! (Cavalier, passe ton chemin!)
- Jared Diamond – Collapse: How Societies Choose to Fail or Succeed
- Joan Didion – The Year of Magical Thinking
- Robert Fisk – The Great War for Civilisation: The Conquest of the Middle East
- Randy Grim – Miracle Dog
- John Grogan – Marley & Me
- Michael Gross – 740 Park: The Story of the World's Richest Apartment Building
- James Whitney Hicks – 50 Signs of Mental Illness: A Guide to Understanding Mental Health
- Adam Hochschild – Bury the Chains
- Tom Holland – Persian Fire: The First World Empire and the Battle for the West
- Tony Judt – Postwar: A History of Europe Since 1945
- W. Chan Kim and Renée Mauborgne – Blue Ocean Strategy
- Lawrence M. Krauss – Hiding in the Mirror
- Mark Levin – Men In Black: How The Supreme Court Is Destroying America
- Alexander Masters – Stuart: A Life Backwards
- Azadeh Moaveni – Lipstick Jihad
- Peter C. Newman – The Secret Mulroney Tapes: Unguarded Confessions of a Prime Minister
- Lisa Randall – Warped Passages
- Paul A. Robinson – Queer Wars
- Michael Ruhlman and Brian Polcyn – Charcuterie: The Craft of Salting, Smoking and Curing
- James S. Shapiro – 1599: A Year in the Life of William Shakespeare
- Masamune Shirow – Ghost in the Shell 2: Man/Machine Interface
- Rebecca Solnit – A Field Guide to Getting Lost
- David Southwell – Secrets and Lies
- James B. Stewart – DisneyWar

== Films ==
- Charlie and the Chocolate Factory
- Oliver Twist
- Pride & Prejudice
- Harry Potter and the Goblet of Fire

== Deaths ==
- January 4 – Humphrey Carpenter, English biographer, children's fiction writer and radio broadcaster (born 1946)
- January 7 – Pierre Daninos, French novelist (born 1913)
- January 14 – Charlotte MacLeod, American mystery writer (born 1922)
- January 15
  - Walter Ernsting, German science fiction author (born 1920)
  - Elizabeth Janeway, American feminist author (born 1913)
- January 19 – K. Sello Duiker, South African novelist (suicide; born 1974)
- January 20 – Roland Frye, American theologian and critic (born 1921)
- January 21
  - John L. Hess, American journalist and critic (born 1917)
  - Theun de Vries, Dutch writer and poet (born 1907)
- January 24 – Vladimir Savchenko, Ukrainian science fiction writer (born 1933)
- January 25 – Max Velthuijs, Dutch writer and illustrator (born 1923)
- January 29 – Ephraim Kishon, Israeli satirist, dramatist, and screenwriter (born 1924)
- February 10 – Arthur Miller, American playwright (born 1915)
- February 11 – Jack L. Chalker, American science fiction writer (born 1944)
- February 20 – Hunter S. Thompson, American writer, creator of Gonzo journalism (born 1937)
- February 21 – Guillermo Cabrera Infante, Cuban novelist (born 1929)
- February 25 – Phoebe Hesketh, English poet (born 1909)
- March 7 – Willis Hall, English playwright (born 1929)
- March 8
  - Alice Thomas Ellis, English novelist, essayist and cookery book author (born 1932)
  - Anna Haycraft, English novelist (born 1932)
- March 10 – Patience Gray, English cookery and travel writer (born 1917)
- March 17 – Andre Norton, American science fiction writer (born 1912)
- March 22 – Anthony Creighton, English playwright (born 1922)
- March 30 – Robert Creeley, American poet (born 1926)
- April 5 – Saul Bellow, Canadian writer (born 1915)
- April 7 – Yvonne Vera, Zimbabwean novelist (meningitis, born 1964)
- April 26 – Augusto Roa Bastos, Paraguayan novelist (born 1917)
- May 7 – Tristan Egolf, American novelist (suicide, born 1971)
- June 9 – Hovis Presley, English poet (heart attack, born 1960)
- June 10 – Nick Darke, Cornish playwright (cancer, born 1948)
- June 14 – Norman Levine, Canadian short story writer (born 1923)
- June 16 – Enrique Laguerre, Puerto Rican novelist (born 1905)
- June 20 – Larry Collins, American novelist (born 1929)
- June 22 – William Donaldson, English satirist (born 1935)
- June 27 – Shelby Foote, American novelist (born 1916)
- June 28 – Philip Hobsbaum, Scottish poet and critic (born 1932)
- June 30 – Christopher Fry, English dramatist (born 1907)
- July 6
  - Evan Hunter, American novelist (born 1926)
  - Claude Simon, French Nobel laureate in literature (born 1913)
- July 7 – Gustaf Sobin, American poet (born 1935)
- July 17 – Gavin Lambert, English novelist and biographer (born 1924)
- July 19 – Edward Bunker, American crime writer (born 1933)
- August 9 – Judith Rossner, American novelist (born 1935)
- August 16 – William Corlett, English author and playwright (born 1938)
- August 21 – Dahlia Ravikovitch, Israeli poet (born 1036)
- August 29 – Sybil Marshall, English novelist (born 1913)
- September 3 – R. S. R. Fitter, English nature writer (born 1913)
- September 26 – Helen Cresswell, English children's writer (born 1934)
- September 27
  - Ronald Pearsall, English writer (born 1927)
  - Mary Lee Settle, American novelist (born 1918)
- October 2 – August Wilson, American playwright (born 1945)
- October 17 – Ba Jin (巴金), Chinese novelist (born 1904)
- October 31 – Amrita Pritam, Indian Punjabi poet and novelist (born 1919)
- November 1 – Michael Thwaites, Australian poet (born 1915)
- November 2 – Gordon A. Craig, Scottish historian
- November 4 – Michael G. Coney, Canadian science-fiction writer (born 1932)
- November 5 – John Fowles, English writer (born 1926)
- November 21 – Aileen Fox, English archaeologist (born 1907)
- November 26 – Stan Berenstain, American children's writer and illustrator (born 1923)
- December 1 – Mary Hayley Bell, dramatist
- December 2 – Christine Pullein-Thompson, English novelist (born 1925)
- December 9 – Robert Sheckley, American short story writer (born 1928)
- December 15 – Julián Marías, Spanish philosopher and author (born 1914)
- December 16 – Kenneth Bulmer, English novelist and short story writer (born 1921)

== Awards ==
- Nobel Prize in Literature: Harold Pinter
- Camões Prize: Lygia Fagundes Telles

=== Australia ===
- The Australian/Vogel Literary Award: Andrew T. O'Connor, Tuvalu
- C. J. Dennis Prize for Poetry: M. T. C. Cronin, <More or Less Than> 1–100
- Kenneth Slessor Prize for Poetry: Samuel Wagan Watson, Smoke Encrypted Whispers
- Miles Franklin Award: Andrew McGahan, The White Earth

=== Canada ===
- Governor General's Award for English-language fiction: David Gilmour, A Perfect Night to Go to China
- Griffin Poetry Prize: Roo Borson, Short Journey Upriver Towards Oishida and Charles Simic, Selected Poems: 1963-2003
- Hugo Award for Best Novel: Susanna Clarke, Jonathan Strange & Mr Norrell
- Scotiabank Giller Prize: David Bergen, The Time in Between
- Edna Staebler Award for Creative Non-Fiction: Anne Coleman, I'll Tell You a Secret

=== Sweden ===
- Astrid Lindgren Memorial Award: Philip Pullman and Ryōji Arai

=== United Kingdom ===
- Bruntwood Prize for Playwriting (first award): Duncan Macmillan, Monster
- Caine Prize for African Writing: S. A. Afolabi, "Monday Morning"
- Carnegie Medal for children's literature: Mal Peet, Tamar
- Cholmondeley Award: Jane Duran, Christopher Logue, M. R. Peacocke, Neil Rollinson
- Commonwealth Writers Prize: Andrea Levy, Small Island
- Dagger of Daggers: John le Carré, The Spy Who Came in from the Cold (1963)
- Eric Gregory Award: Melanie Challenger, Carolyn Jess, Luke Kennard, Jaim Smith
- James Tait Black Memorial Prize for biography: Sue Prideaux, Edvard Munch: Behind the Scream
- James Tait Black Memorial Prize for fiction: Ian McEwan, Saturday
- Man Booker International Prize (first award): Ismail Kadare
- Man Booker Prize: John Banville, The Sea
- Samuel Johnson Prize: Jonathan Coe, Like A Fiery Elephant: The Story of B. S. Johnson
- Orange Prize for Fiction: Lionel Shriver, We Need to Talk About Kevin
- Somerset Maugham Award: Justin Hill, Passing Under Heaven; Maggie O'Farrell, The Distance Between Us
- Whitbread Book of the Year Award: Hilary Spurling, Matisse the Master: The Conquest of Colour 1909-1954

=== United States ===
- Aiken Taylor Award for Modern American Poetry: B. H. Fairchild
- Agnes Lynch Starrett Poetry Prize: Rick Hilles, Brother Salvage: Poems
- Arthur Rense Prize: Daniel Hoffman
- Bollingen Prize for Poetry: Jay Wright
- Brittingham Prize in Poetry: Susanna Childress, Jagged with Love
- Compton Crook Award: Tamara Siler Jones, Ghosts in the Snow
- Frost Medal: Marie Ponsot
- Hugo Award: Susanna Clarke, Jonathan Strange & Mr Norrell
- Lambda Literary Awards: Multiple categories; see 2005 Lambda Literary Awards.
- National Book Award for Poetry: W. S. Merwin, Migration: New and Selected Poems
- National Book Critics Circle Award: to War Trash by Ha Jin
- Newbery Medal: Cynthia Kadohata, Kira-Kira
- PEN/Faulkner Award for Fiction: to The March by E.L. Doctorow
- Pulitzer Prize for Drama: John Patrick Shanley, Doubt: A Parable
- Pulitzer Prize for Fiction: Marilynne Robinson, Gilead
- Pulitzer Prize for Poetry: Ted Kooser, Delights & Shadows
- Wallace Stevens Award: Gerald Stern
- Whiting Awards:

Fiction: Sarah Shun-lien Bynum, Nell Freudenberger, Seth Kantner, John Keene (fiction/poetry)
Plays: Rinne Groff
Poetry: Thomas Sayers Ellis, Ilya Kaminsky, Dana Levin, Spencer Reece, Tracy K. Smith

=== Other ===
- Commander of the Ordre des Arts et des Lettres: Patti Smith
- German Book Prize (first award): Arno Geiger, Es geht uns gut (We Are Doing Fine)
- Friedenspreis des Deutschen Buchhandels: Orhan Pamuk
- International Dublin Literary Award: Edward P. Jones, The Known World

== See also ==
- List of years in literature
- Literature
- Poetry
- List of literary awards
- List of poetry awards
- 2005 in Australian literature

== Notes ==
- Hahn, Daniel (2015). The Oxford Companion to Children's Literature (2nd ed.). Oxford. University Press. ISBN 9780198715542.
