= Volodymyr Savchenko =

Volodymyr Savchenko may refer to:

- Volodymyr Savchenko (writer) (1933–2005), Soviet-Ukrainian science fiction writer
- Volodymyr Savchenko (footballer) (born 1973), Ukrainian football coach and former goalkeeper
