= Pygmy (disambiguation) =

Pygmy refers to a member of any human group whose adult males grow to less than a specific height.

Pygmy may also refer to:

- Pygmy (Greek mythology), a tribe of diminutive humans in Greek mythology
- Pygmy (novel), 2009 novel by Chuck Palahniuk
- A person of short stature, see Dwarfism

== See also ==
- - includes many animals with names of form "Pygmy [noun]"
- - a rarer alternative spelling
- - includes animals with names of form "[Adjective] pygmy [noun]"
- Pygmy forest, forest which only contains miniature trees
- Forest of the Pygmies, original title El bosque de los pigmeos, 2004 novel by Isabel Allende
- King of the Pygmies, 2005 young adult novel by Jonathon Scott Fuqua
