= Velocity (novel) =

2005 novel by Dean Koontz

- Author: Dean Koontz
- Language: English
- Genre: Suspense, mystery
- Publisher: Bantam Publishing
- Publication date: 2005
- Publication place: United States
- Media type: Print (paperback)
- Pages: 496 pp
- ISBN: 0-553-58825-7
- OCLC: 68169613

Velocity is a novel by Dean Koontz first published in 2005. Set in Napa County, California, it is about a man in his thirties who takes the law into his own hands when, out of the blue, he is threatened by an anonymous adversary. The "words of wisdom" with which the novel is interspersed are direct quotations from the writings of T. S. Eliot.

== Plot summary ==
Promising young short story writer, Billy Wiles has not even turned on his computer since his fiancée Barbara fell into a coma several years ago. Leading the life of a recluse who spends his spare time alone at home doing woodwork, he leaves his secluded house only when he goes to work as a bartender. An orphan, he associates with only a few people, and he considers them acquaintances rather than friends.

Wiles' life takes a dramatic turn when he finds a piece of paper stuck to his windshield which contains an ultimatum (see book cover, below). He decides not to go to the police and to consult someone he knows who happens to be in the police force instead. Together, although not thoroughly convinced, the two men decide that the note must have been some sick joke.

The following day, however, a cruel murder is reported which exactly fits the description given in advance by the alleged joker. Two more notes follow in quick succession, and only when they become increasingly personal does Wiles realize that he has not been chosen at random by the person he comes to think of as "the freak". For example, shortly after receiving a cryptic message saying Are you prepared for your first wound? he is physically assaulted by the mask-wearing killer. When Wiles recovers from the shock and the pain he realizes that the psychopath has driven three large fish hooks under the skin of his forehead.

Acts of violence like the one depicted above lead the third person narrator to reflect on the society we live in:

The first ultimatum set by "the freak"

"Not long ago in the history of the world, routine daily violence—excluding the ravages of nations at war—had been largely personal in nature. Grudges, slights to honor, adultery, disputes over money triggered the murderous impulse.

"In the modern world, more in the postmodern, most of all in the post-postmodern, much violence had become impersonal. Terrorists, street gangs, lone sociopaths, sociopaths in groups and pledged to a utopian vision killed people they did not know, against whom they had no realistic complaint, for the purpose of attracting attention, making a statement, intimidation, or even just for the thrill of it.

"The freak, whether known or unknown to Billy, was a daunting adversary. Judging by all evidence, he was bold but not reckless, psychopathic but self-controlled, clever, ingenious, cunning, with a baroque and Machiavellian mind.

"By contrast, Billy Wiles made his way in the world as plainly and directly as he could. His mind was not baroque. His desires were not complex. He only hoped to live, and lived on guarded hope." (Chapter 14)

Although Wiles does check on each of the few acquaintances he has, he cannot at first decide which of them, if any, might be the freak. Eventually he focuses his attention on Steve Zillis, one of his workmates. It soon turns out, however, that Zillis has a watertight alibi for the time when some of the crimes were committed, and Wiles ends up none the wiser.

Wiles has very clear reasons for not involving the police. Right from the beginning of his nightmarish adventure, he has a hunch that circumstantial evidence, possibly planted by the killer, would turn him into the prime suspect: In the eyes of the police, he would be the perpetrator rather than one of the victims. Also, as more murders are committed, he realizes that he might endanger Barbara's life.

In the end Wiles finds out that the psychopath sees his crimes as a work of art rather than, say, a game (cf. for example Gentlemen & Players). He discovers that the freak is the artist, Valis, and confronts him. After a short discussion, Billy sprays Valis with Mace and shoots him dead. Returning home, Billy mistakenly assumes that he and Barbara are safe; however, when he replays the video camera, he sees Zillis in his house, and realises that Valis and Zillis were working together. He manages to catch up with Zillis before he can kill Barbara, and after driving him out into the country, kills Zillis.

The book ends with Billy (now called Bill) caring for Barbara in his own home. At the very end of the book, Barbara's eyes open and she comments on a flock of Barn Swallows flying past. While her eyes close again, the ending seems promising for her imminent recovery.

== Spinoff ==
In February 2014, Dean Koontz announced that his upcoming novel Secret Forest would be a spinoff of this novel. The story will focus on Ivy Elgin, a supporting character from Velocity that Koontz stated he has received much correspondence about from readers.
