= The Last Templar =

2005 novel by Raymond Khoury

- Cover
- Author: Raymond Khoury
- Language: English
- Genre: Suspense, mystery novel
- Publisher: Ziji Publishing; Orion Books (paperback)
- Publication date: 2005
- Publication place: United Kingdom
- English publication date: 2005
- Media type: Print (Paperback/Hardcover)
- Pages: 524 ½
- ISBN: 0-7528-7968-5
- OCLC: 173077978

The Last Templar is a 2005 novel by Raymond Khoury, and is also his debut work. The novel was on the New York Times Bestseller list for 22 months. As of 2012, it has sold over 5 million copies worldwide. It was adapted into a television miniseries in 2009.

== Back story ==
In A.D. 1291, following the fall of Acre, the Latin Kingdom of Jerusalem, to the Saracens, a small party of Knights Templar left the city with a small chest. Their ship, the Falcon Temple, is damaged in a storm at sea and sinks. One of the knights is mortally wounded in the event; he dies on land after hiding a small leather pouch under a gravestone. He charges the remainder of the ship's company to deliver an encoded letter to the head of the Templars.

The last surviving knight reaches Paris in 1314, just in time to see the order's last Grand Master, Jacques de Molay, being burned at the stake after refusing to reveal the location of the Templars' treasure. The last knight commits himself to maintaining the legend of the Templars' threat to the Catholic Church.

== Plot summary ==
In the present, four people on horseback dressed as Templars storm New York's Metropolitan Museum of Art during its exhibition of The Treasures of the Vatican. The raid results in injury and death; most of the artifacts on display are either destroyed or stolen. Most notable is the theft of a multigeared rotor encoder.

Tess Chaykin, an archaeologist, survives the raid, but is bothered by something mouthed by the leader of the Templars as he stole the encoder: "Veritas vos liberabit." After a fruitless Internet search to figure out the significance of the cryptic phrase, Chaykin visits a former colleague who informs her that the phrase has Templar connections (it was carved into a Templar castle in France), and advises her that pursuing the inquiry further requires an expert on the Templars. Tess decides to locate William Vance, an old friend who turns out to be missing.

One of the Met raiders, Gus Waldron, tries to sell a stolen piece to antique dealer Lucien Boussard. The dealer tips off the FBI about Waldron's connection to the museum raid.

The following day, Waldron notices the cops surrounding Lucien's store. He sets the antique store proprietor on fire and uses him as cover to get to a taxi. He kills the driver and flees, with the FBI, including the agent in charge of the case, Sean Reilly, in pursuit. The chase ends when Waldron accidentally plows into a storefront, leaving him severely injured.

In the hospital a man, unaffiliated with the police, tortures Waldron into revealing that he was hired by one Branko Petrovic for the Met job, and then kills Waldron. The man finds Branko, tortures him into revealing the name of a third conspirator, and consequently kills Branko and his co-conspirator.

Tess finds Vance, and realizes that he was the fourth horseman in the museum. He explains that he has used the stolen encoder to decode a shocking manuscript from the Templar castle in France. He is interrupted by Monsignor de Angelis, Vatican special envoy, helping the FBI investigate the Met incident. While Vance fights with the Monsignor, Tess escapes with some of Vance's papers.

Tess shows Reilly the papers and he has them photographed. He then decides to find Vance. As soon as he leaves, Tess gets a call from her mother, explaining that Vance was at her house. Once she arrives at home, she gives Vance back his papers, and he leaves, content.

Upon discovering that everything entering the United States was X-rayed, Reilly finds an image of the encoder at JFK Airport, its port of entry for the ill-fated Met exhibit. This information is sufficient to build a working replica of the encoder, which decrypts a letter from one of the Knights Templar about the fall of Acre which the FBI photographed. Tess is intrigued by its mention of a place called Fonsalis, and discovers that it was located in Turkey.

Tess and Reilly travel to Turkey and find a small leather pouch hidden in the ruins of a church. The pouch is stolen by Vance and its contents are revealed to be an astrolabe, an ancient navigational instrument. Men from the Vatican start shooting at them and kill their guide and Vance's thugs. Tess, Reilly and Vance escape with the astrolabe; Vance reveals that there was a chest on the Falcon Temple when it sank, and the three discuss what could be inside it. The astrolabe can be used to locate the sunken ship.

Tess and Vance leave to find the Falcon Temple; Reilly is taken to the Vatican by one of its guerilla-priests, who happens to also be a CIA operative. Cardinal Brugnone reveals that the Templars possessed the diary of Jesus, in which he claimed to be a man and not divine.

Tess and Vance find the Falcon Temple just as a major storm blows in. The Templars' chest is hidden in the falcon-shaped figurehead of the ship. Vance recovers the figurehead but it is lost again when his boat is attacked. It turns out that the Vatican has pursued them, and wants to stop the recovery. De Angelis fires a cannon at Vance's boat and sinks it. Reilly, who is on the Vatican's boat, shoots De Angelis and then jumps overboard and uses a life raft to find Tess. Tess wakes in a hospital room on a small Greek island, to find Reilly badly hurt and in a coma. She walks around the island and, improbably, finds the figurehead with the chest inside containing the diary of Jesus, but is unable to read its Aramaic script. Reilly awakens from his coma and Tess takes him to a deserted hilltop to show him the diary. Tess realizes that the scroll is meaningless, without verifying its authenticity;, however, after her stay on the island and time to think she has a change of heart about releasing the diary. Vance, who has also survived the shipwreck, steals the diary, but in his vengeance stumbles over a cliff. Vance is killed when he falls off the cliff, and the diary's pages are scattered.

== Characters ==
=== Martin of Carmaux ===
Martin is in the secondary plot of the story and is a Templar. After his mentor Aimard dies, he is to take a message to the Grand Master, but after many perils, he is captured in Tuscany and forced into slavery for years before returning to France.

=== Tess Chaykin ===
Tess is an archaeologist and was in the museum when it was attacked. She is a main part in discovering where the pouch is and after she befriends Reilly, they go together to Turkey to find the pouch.

=== Sean Reilly ===
Reilly is an FBI agent who is assigned the case of the museum attack. After capturing Waldron and finding the other two people who attacked the museum dead, he befriends Tess. He is a Roman Catholic.

=== Gus Waldron, Branko Petrovic and Mitch Adeson ===
These are the three men who, with Vance, attacked the museum and took the multi-geared rotor encoder. The three are killed by a man named Plunkett, who kills each man in a different way. They are all killed alone on de Angelis's orders.

=== William "Bill" Vance ===
Vance is the main antagonist and raids the museum and takes the encoding device. His motives are to reveal to the world that Christianity is based on a falsehood. The falsehood, to him, is that Jesus of Nazareth was divine and not just a spiritual teacher. He believes that revealing this will be the end of the religion. He wants to do this because a priest advised him and his wife against aborting a high-risk pregnancy. This resulted in the deaths of Vance's wife and unborn daughter. Vance dies after he falls from a ledge reaching for the Gospel.

=== Monsignor de Angelis ===
De Angelis is a monsignor working for the Vatican. He is behind the killing of the three raiders and sinks the boat that Tess was on to prevent the recovery of the figurehead containing the Templars' chest. He also received training and orders from the CIA.

== Adaptations ==
=== Graphic novel series ===
Between 2009 and 2013, the French publisher Dargaud released a four-part graphic novel adaptation of The Last Templar.

The series was later expanded with a further two volumes adapting the sequel The Templar Salvation.

Volume	Based upon	Title	Artist	Publication date	ISBN
1	The Last Templar	L'encodeur	Miguel Lalor	13 March 2009	ISBN 978-2-205-06060-7
2	The Last Templar	Le chevalier de la crypte	Miguel Lalor	26 February 2010	ISBN 978-2-205-06305-9
3	The Last Templar	L'église engloutie	Miguel Lalor	20 May 2011	ISBN 978-2-205-06772-9
4	The Last Templar	Le faucon du temple	Miguel Lalor	18 January 2013	ISBN 978-2-205-06772-9
5	The Templar Salvation	Oeuvre du démon	Bruno Rocco	7 March 2014	ISBN 978-2-205-07008-8
6	The Templar Salvation	Le Chevalier manchot	Bruno Rocco	4 October 2016	ISBN 978-2-205-07293-8

An English language translation of the series is published in the UK by Cinebook.

Volume	Based upon	Title	Artist	Publication date	ISBN
1	The Last Templar	The Encoder	Miguel Lalor	2 June 2016	ISBN 978-1-849-18299-7
2	The Last Templar	The Knight in the Crypt	Miguel Lalor	4 August 2016	ISBN 978-1-849-18308-6
3	The Last Templar	The Sunken Church	Miguel Lalor	16 March 2017	ISBN 978-1-849-18321-5
4	The Last Templar	The Falcon Temple	Miguel Lalor	18 May 2017	ISBN 978-1-849-18322-2
5	The Templar Salvation	The Devil's Handiwork	Bruno Rocco	18 January 2018	ISBN 978-1-849-18327-7
6	The Templar Salvation	The One-Armed Knight	Bruno Rocco	26 April 2018	ISBN 978-1-849-18393-2

=== TV miniseries ===
NBC made a two-part television miniseries starring Mira Sorvino, Scott Foley, Victor Garber, and Omar Sharif. It aired over two successive nights: Sunday, January 25 and Monday, January 26, 2009. It re-aired Sunday, May 31 and Sunday, June 7, 2009. The TV miniseries The Last Templar was criticized in Turkey by the media for misrepresenting the geography of Turkey.

The movie is much different than the book. In the movie, Tess pursues the Met's "Templars" on a police horse; in the book she was hiding with everyone else. Gus Waldron is depicted as a crook who was trying to solicit an antiquarian's help to sell the relic he stole at the Met; in the movie, this line is omitted. Vance was shooting Tess at the cemetery (with a paralyzing gun) and, literally, kidnapped her to his dungeon, while in the movie he is presented as Tess' friend. The role of Tess's daughter, Kim, is left to a minimum in the book, while in the movie, she is helping her mom to solve a clue on old Arab town's location. The name of the "Turkish" town recorded by Al-Idrisi is different, and in the book it is underwater (as a result of a nearby dam's work). Reilly is taken to Vatican where he was compelled to help in finding Tess and Vance; in the book they all and De Angelis are on the same boat. There are more differences than similarities between the book and TV miniseries.

Above comment is incorrect in the book the FBI agent Reilly is taken to the Vatican and compelled to assist in finding Tess and Vance, they all appear in the same boat later in the story.

In the book, Tess and Vance are on a research ship looking for the ship Falcon Temple. Reilly and De Angelis are on a Turkish Coast Guard patrol boat looking for Tess and Vance. All four characters are never on the same ship.

== Sequel ==
A sequel to the novel, The Templar Salvation, was published in 2010.

== See also ==
- Siege of Acre (1291)
- The Da Vinci Code
- The Templar Revelation
