= Ronald Pearsall =

English writer

Ronald Joseph Pearsall (20 October 1927 – 27 September 2005) was an English writer whose scope included children's stories, pornography and fishing.

His most famous book The Worm in the Bud (1969) was about Victorian sexuality, including orgies, prostitution and fetishism. A prolific writer, his other books included three on popular music between 1837 and 1929, several on the history of sexuality and many on antiques. He held other jobs as a shoe shop assistant, cinema manager and store detective. His book The Table Rappers (1972) was an exposure of fraud mediums, tricksters and charlatans in Spiritualism.

== Bibliography ==
- 1966: Is That My Hook in Your Ear? A Light-hearted Look at Angling. London: Stanley Paul
- 1969: The Worm in the Bud: The World of Victorian Sexuality. London: Weidenfeld and Nicolson ISBN 0-297-17663-3
- 1972: The Exorcism. London: Sphere Books ISBN 0-7221-6742-3 (a novel)
- 1972: The Possessed. London: Sphere Books ISBN 0-7221-6737-7 (a novel)
- 1972: The Table-rappers. London: Michael Joseph ISBN 0-7181-0645-8
- 1972: Victorian Sheet Music Covers. Newton Abbot: David & Charles ISBN 0-7153-5561-9
- 1973: Collecting Mechanical Antiques. Newton Abbot: David & Charles ISBN 0-7153-5879-0
- 1973: Edwardian Life and Leisure. Newton Abbot: David & Charles ISBN 0-7153-6121-X
- 1973: Victorian Popular Music. Newton Abbot: David & Charles ISBN 0-7153-5689-5
- 1974: Collecting and Restoring Scientific Instruments. Newton Abbot: David & Charles ISBN 0-7153-6354-9
- 1974: Inside the Antique Trade. Shaldon: Keith Reid ISBN 0-904094-03-0 (with Graham Webb)
- 1975: Collapse of Stout Party: Victorian Wit and Humour. London: Weidenfeld and Nicolson ISBN 0-297-77020-9
- 1975: Edwardian Popular Music. Newton Abbot: David & Charles ISBN 0-7153-6814-1
- 1975: Night's Black Angels: The Forms and Faces of Victorian Cruelty. London: Hodder and Stoughton ISBN 0-340-17392-0
- 1976: The Alchemists. London: Weidenfeld and Nicolson ISBN 0-297-77086-1
- 1976: The Belvedere. London: Weidenfeld and Nicolson ISBN 0-297-77064-0 (a novel)
- 1976: Popular Music of the Twenties. Newton Abbot: David & Charles ISBN 0-7153-7036-7
- 1976: Public Purity, Private Shame: Victorian Sexual Hypocrisy Exposed. London: Weidenfeld and Nicolson ISBN 0-297-77122-1
- 1977: Conan Doyle: A Biographical Solution. London: Weidenfeld and Nicolson ISBN 0-297-77272-4
- 1978: Tides of War. London: Michael Joseph ISBN 0-7181-1602-X (a novel)
- 1979: The Iron Sleep. London: Michael Joseph ISBN 0-7181-1761-1 (a novel about the first World War)
- 1981: Tell Me, Pretty Maiden: The Victorian and Edwardian Nude. Exeter: Webb & Bower ISBN 0-906671-24-8
- 1986: Making and Managing an Antique Shop.Newton Abbot: David & Charles ISBN 0-7153-8905-X
- 1988: The Joy of Antiques. Newton Abbot: David & Charles ISBN 0-7153-0028-8
- 1989: Sherlock Holmes Investigates the Murder in Euston Square. Newton Abbot: David & Charles ISBN 0-7153-9331-6
- 1990: Antique Furniture for Pleasure and Profit. Newton Abbot: David & Charles ISBN 0-7153-9387-1
- 1991: The David & Charles Encyclopedia of Everyday Antiques. Newton Abbot: David & Charles ISBN 0-7153-9868-7
- 1991: Lifesaving: The Story of the Royal Life Saving Society; the first 100 years. Newton Abbot: David & Charles ISBN 0-7153-9867-9
- 1991: Painting Abstract Pictures. Newton Abbot: David & Charles ISBN 0-7153-9460-6
- 1992: Antique Furniture Almanac . Moffat: Lochar ISBN 0-948403-73-X
- 1996: Illustrated Guide to Collecting Antiques. New York: Todtri ISBN 1-57717-000-8
- 1996: Lost at Sea: Great Shipwrecks of History. New York: Todtri ISBN 1-880908-52-2
- 1996: Painting Course: Introduction to Drawing: Watercolour, Gouache and Tempera: Pastel and Acrylic: Oil Painting. London: Chancellor ISBN 1-85152-973-X (originally published in four separate vols. London: Trodd, 1990)
- 1997: A Connoisseur's Guide to Antique Clocks & Watches. New York: Todtri ISBN 1-57717-044-X
- 1997: A Connoisseur's Guide to Antique Furniture. New York: Smithmark ISBN 0-7651-9234-9
- 1997: A Connoisseur's Guide to Antique Pottery & Porcelain. New York: Smithmark ISBN 0-7651-9235-7
- 1997: A Connoisseur's Guide to Antique Silver. New York: Smithmark ISBN 0-7651-9236-5
- 1998: Myths and Legends of Ireland. New York: Todtri ISBN 1-880908-43-3
- 1999: A Connoisseur's Guide to Antique Dolls. New York: Todtri ISBN 1-57717-150-0
- 1999: A Connoisseur's Guide to Antique Jewellery. New York: Todtri ISBN 1-57717-152-7
- 1999: A Connoisseur's Guide to Antique Toys. New York: Todtri ISBN 1-57717-151-9
- 1999: Kings & Queens: A History of British Monarchy. New York: Todtri ISBN 1-880908-97-2
- 1999: Mysterious Places of the World. New York: Todtri ISBN 1-57717-157-8
- 1999: The Romance of Travel. New York: Todtri ISBN 1-57717-156-X
- 2000: A Connoisseur's Guide to Antique Glass. New York: Todtri ISBN 1-57717-153-5

As editor

- 1972: A Secret Diary: The Intimate Memoirs of Vicar Veitch. London: David Bruce & Watson ISBN 0-85127-001-8
