= Rajaa al-Sanea =

Saudi writer (born 1981)

Rajaa al-Sanea رجاء الصانع
- Born: 1981 (age 44–45); Saudi Arabia
- Education: University of Illinois at Chicago College of Dentistry
- Occupations: Author; Dentist
- Known for: Writing Girls of Riyadh (بنات الرياض Banāt al-Riyāḍ)

Rajaa al-Sanea (رجاء بنت عبد الله الصانع; born in 1981, on 11 September) is a Saudi Arabian writer who became famous through her novel Girls of Riyadh (بنات الرياض Banāt al-Riyāḍ). The book was first published in Lebanon in 2005 and in English in 2007. Al-Sanea grew up in Riyadh, Saudi Arabia, the daughter of a family of doctors. As of 2014, she is currently an assistant professor at the University of Illinois in Chicago.

== Education ==
She received her bachelor's degree in dentistry from King Saud University in 2005. She continued her education in the United States with the support of the King Abdullah scholarship program. In 2008, Al-Sanea received her master's degree in oral sciences from University of Illinois at Chicago College of Dentistry.

== Career ==
Al-Sanea rose to prominence in 2005 via the publication of her debut novel Girls of Riyadh. The story follows the love lives of four young women, Gamrah, Lamees, Sadeem and Michelle –who is half Saudi and half American- through the form of a series of emails written by an unnamed narrator. Upon publication, the novel was immediately banned in Saudi Arabia, as the depiction of infidelity, pre-marital relations and homosexuality was seen as inflammatory material.

During the controversy, Al-Sanea, who was in Chicago at the time, claimed to have received more than 1,000 emails a day with some containing serious threats towards her life. She also mentioned losing friends due to the contents of the book, as well as having her scholarship in the United States being threatened.

Though the novel received backlash from the Saudi government, Girls of Riyadh garnered mass media attention, with many praising the author for taking a bold and uncensored approach in the depiction of the four young women. Girls of Riyadh was translated from Arabic to English in 2007 by Marilyn Booth. Booth was the original translator of Rajaa Alsanea's bestseller Girls of Riyadh. However, in a letter to the Times Literary Supplement in September 2007, she asserted that the author Al-Sanea and the publishers Penguin had interfered with her initial translation, resulting in a final version that was "inferior and infelicitous". Booth also wrote about this incident in a scholarly article titled "Translator v. author" published in a 2008 issue of Translation Studies.

Despite the popularity of her debut novel, Al-Sanea has not turned to writing as a full-time career. Since returning to Saudi Arabia, she has served as a consultant endodontist and researcher in the stem cell therapy program at King Faisal Specialist Hospital and Research Center in Riyadh. In an interview with The National News, the author said, “Dentistry is my job and writing will always be my passion”.

== Awards ==
- Al-Sanea's Girls of Riyadh was long-listed for the Dublin Literary Award in 2009.
- Arabian Business released a list of the strongest and most influential Arabs under the age of 40 and Rajaa Al-Sanea ranked as the 37th. This list aimed to shed more light on the influential group of youths. They expressed that the names on this list will have a great impact on their societies not only now, but also in the future. The people on this list are not only influential within their own countries, but they are also internationally—something that Arabian Business emphasise is worthy of drawing attention to.

== Lawsuit ==
In 2006, two Saudi citizens sued the Ministry of Information, asking that the permission they had granted for the publication of Girls of Riyadh be withdrawn, and further requesting that importation and distribution of the book be prohibited and that al-Sanea be punished for writing it. The suit claimed that the book encouraged immorality and misinterpreted verses of the Quran that are quoted in the book. The suit was rejected by the Court of Grievances.
