= Drama High =

Novel series by Lysa Divine

- Author: Lysa Divine
- Country: United States
- Language: English
- Genre: Young adult
- Publisher: Dafina (1–14); Ebb & Flow Publications/L. Divine Inc. (15–present)
- Published in English: October 1, 2005–present
- No. of books: 20 (List of books)
- Website: https://dramahigh.com/

Drama High is an ongoing series of young adult fiction novels written by the American author Lysa Divine. The series comprises 20 novels and follows the main character, Jayd Jackson through her life in Los Angeles, California as she struggles to balance school, friendships, family, and all the drama that comes with them. The novels contain an element of speculative fiction as the main character comes from a long line of voodoo priestesses and is a priestess in training. The first fourteen books were published through Dafina, an imprint of Kensington Books. Starting in 2012 Divine began self-publishing the series under Ebb & Flow Publications/L. Divine Inc.

== Plot ==
The series is told in the voice of Jayd Jackson, a strong opinionated high school student from Compton, California who comes from a long line of Louisiana conjure women. Jayd is continuously presented with both supernatural and practical problems in which she must use the teachings of her maternal ancestors (the Williams women) to help her solve. The series takes place in modern-day Los Angeles, California and contains many references to real life places. The novels are stemmed in the teachings of the Yoruba religion and maintain the presence of both African American and Latin cultures. The characters attend South Bay High, a fictional high school where the majority of the student body and teaching staff are privileged and white, ultimately causing racial tension between the students and the teachers alike. The series is expected to contain forty-four novels which will follow its main character Jayd out of high school and into college in its extension Drama U.

== Novels ==
1. The Fight (2006)
2. Second Chance (2006)
3. Jayd's Legacy (2007)
4. Frenemies (2008)
5. Lady J (2008)
6. Courtin’ Jayd (2008)
7. Hustlin’ (2009)
8. Keep It Movin’ (2009)
9. Holidaze (2009)
10. Culture Clash (2010)
11. Cold as Ice (2010)
12. Pushin’ (2010)
13. The Meltdown (2011)
14. So, So Hood (2011)
15. Street Soldiers (2012)
16. No Mercy (2013)
17. Sweet Dreams (2014)
18. Rogue (2016)
19. "No Limit" (2019)
20. "Jayd's House" (2026)
