= The Dharma of Star Wars =

2006 book

- Author: Matthew Bortolin
- Language: English
- Subject: Star Wars; Buddhism
- Genre: Science fiction Religious studies
- Published: 2005
- Publisher: Wisdom Publications
- Publication place: United States
- Media type: Paperback
- Pages: 224
- ISBN: 0-86171-497-0
- OCLC: 57211202
- Dewey Decimal: 294.3/367914375 22
- LC Class: BQ5405 .B67 2005

The Dharma of Star Wars is a book by Matthew Bortolin. The book is a primer for basic Buddhist philosophy using the fictional characters and events of the Star Wars saga to explicate the Buddha's teachings.

Bortolin, an ordained Zen Buddhist and Star Wars fan, explains the principles and practices of Buddhism through the words and actions of Darth Vader, Luke Skywalker, Yoda and other Star Wars characters. The book also examines the underlying philosophical ideas of Star Wars from a Buddhist perspective.
