= Hovis Presley =

English poet and comedian (1960–2005)

- Born: Richard Henry McFarlane; August 3, 1960
- Died: June 9, 2005 (aged 44)
- Education: Thornleigh Salesian College; University of Bradford
- Employer: University of Salford
- Notable work: I Rely On You

Comedy career
- Years active: 1979-2005
- Medium: Stand-up

Hovis Presley (3 August 1960 – 9 June 2005) was an English poet and stand-up comedian from Bolton, Lancashire, noted for his down-to-earth humour.

== Biography ==
Born as Richard Henry McFarlane, he attended Thornleigh Salesian College, Bolton and went on to graduate from Bradford University. He went on to have a variety of jobs and travelled widely, from labouring on German railways to teaching English in Cairo and India. The choice of stage persona "Hovis Presley" was in itself a deft example of aspects of his work—ironic word-play, incongruously blending the expected norms of poetry with slightly surreal evocations of ordinary, and distinctively Northern English life.

Presley began writing poems and sketches as a teenager but only ventured out onto the North West comedy circuit at the age of 29. His poem, "I Rely On You" (included in his 1993 anthology, Poetic Off Licence), was used by many couples in wedding ceremonies.

Presley often performed his poems in a live environment, running an "alternative to alternative comedy clubs" and frequently appearing on radio with John Shuttleworth and Mark Radcliffe among others. He also appeared on the BBC Three show Whine Gums, which presented many modern poets reading their work. His 1997 Edinburgh Festival Fringe show (entitled "Wherever I Lay My Hat, That's My Hat") was described as "an hour of great material, lovingly performed" and sold out. Presley, however, was terrified by this level of success and vanished. The shows were pulled and he was eventually found by police.

After this he concentrated on smaller-scale events, outside the comedy mainstream, often working for charity. He also taught comedy to drama students at the University of Salford, having previously taught English as a second language and general studies. He regularly helped out his students by finding them slots at local comedy nights.

He died in June 2005 after a heart attack brought on by a viral infection. A tribute night was held in his home town of Bolton on 21 November 2005. The show was held in the Albert Halls, Bolton and was attended by Johnny Vegas, Badly Drawn Boy, Graham Fellows, Mark Radcliffe, Justin Moorhouse, Bernard Wrigley, Archie Kelly, Susan Vale, Phil Cool, Bob Williamson and Thick Richard.
