= Raymond Khoury =

Lebanese screenwriter and novelist

- Born: Beirut, Lebanon
- Education: INSEAD
- Occupations: Novelist, Screenwriter
- Writing career
- Period: 1995–present
- Genres: Thriller, Mystery, Historical
- Website: www.raymondkhoury.com

Raymond Khoury (Arabic: ريمون خوري) (born in Beirut, Lebanon) is a Lebanese screenwriter and novelist, best known as the author of the 2006 New York Times bestseller The Last Templar.

== Biography ==
=== Early years ===
Raymond Khoury was born in Lebanon but spent his teenage years in Rye, New York, where his family moved in 1975 to escape the Lebanese Civil War. Khoury returned to Lebanon after his graduation from Rye Country Day High School to attend the American University of Beirut and study architecture. During his time as a student, he also illustrated several children's books for the Oxford University Press Middle East office. Shortly after Khoury completed his degree, fighting broke out in Lebanon again, and in February 1984 he was evacuated from Beirut by the U.S. Marine Corps aboard a Chinook helicopter.

=== Early career ===
After a few months working at a small architectural firm in London, Khoury moved to Fontainebleau, France, where he earned an MBA from INSEAD. Upon his graduation he returned to London, working in investment banking. It was through this unlikely career path that Khoury became interested in writing, as Khoury was introduced to a Wall Street investment banker who developed screenplays in his spare time. Taking an idea of his that the two jointly developed, Khoury wrote a screenplay which was a finalist for a Fulbright Fellowship in Screenwriting. His second writing attempt, a semi-autobiographical account of his college years in war-torn Lebanon was also shortlisted for the same award.

In 1996, Khoury optioned the rights to the Melvyn Bragg novel The Maid of Buttermere and wrote the screenplay adaptation of it. Robert De Niro soon announced to Variety that he would be producing the movie and playing the lead role. Khoury has also written for the BBC shows Spooks (known as MI:5 in the United States) and Waking the Dead.

=== Novels ===
During the early days of his screenwriting career, before he was even able to attract an agent, Khoury completed a screenplay that he called The Last Templar, an "epic" thriller about a search for the lost treasure of the Knights Templar. After 18 months of research and writing, Khoury lent the script to a friend, who immediately suggested that Khoury turn it into a novel. With Khoury's permission, the friend submitted the screenplay to a book agent. Within a few months (in 1996), Khoury was offered a six-figure advance by a major publisher to create a book based on the screenplay, with the stipulation that the book exclude all references to religion. Although at that time Khoury had not sold any of his other writing work, he declined the money and the book deal.

His pet screenplay set aside, Khoury worked on his screenplays for several years, building a successful career for himself in London and in Hollywood, before a new agent at the William Morris Agency, who he had joined at that point, read his screenplay of The Last Templar and encouraged him to adapt it into a novel. Finally, in September 2002, Khoury began researching and writing the novelized version of his screenplay, which took three years to write. The novel sold quickly, and was first released in the U.K. in 2005. It soon became a New York Times bestseller, spending 11 weeks on the hardcover fiction list, and a Number 1 bestseller overseas. It has been translated into 38 languages and published in over 40 countries. Although the book shares some general thematic concepts with those of Da Vinci Code author Dan Brown, Khoury devised his plot before Brown's novels were released.

Following the release of The Sanctuary in August 2007, Khoury wrote his third novel titled The Sign. This was published in the U.S. on May 19, 2009, as both a traditional hardcover book and as an electronic book. The Templar Salvation, a sequel to The Last Templar, was published in 2010.

== Personal ==
Khoury divides his time between Beirut, London and Dubai.

== Bibliography ==
=== Sean Reilly and Tess Chaykin series ===
#	Title	Publication year
1	The Last Templar	2005
2	The Templar Salvation	2010
3	The Devil's Elixir	2011
4	Rasputin's Shadow	2013
5	The End Game	2016

=== Stand-alone novels ===
Title	Publication year
The Sanctuary	2007
The Sign	2009
The Ottoman Secret aka Empire of Lies	2019
