= Girls of Riyadh =

2007 novel by Rajaa Alsanea

- Author: Rajaa Alsanea
- Language: English
- Genre: Novel
- Publisher: Fig Tree (an imprint of Penguin Books)
- Publication date: 5 July 2007
- Publication place: Saudi Arabia
- Pages: 300f

Girls of Riyadh, or Banat al-Riyadh (Arabic: بنات الرياض), is a novel by Rajaa Alsanea. The book, written in the form of e-mails, recounts the personal lives of four young Saudi girls, Lamees, Michelle, Gamrah, and Sadeem.

== Plot summary ==
The novel describes the relationship between men and women in Saudi Arabia. Girls of Riyadh tells the story of four college-age high class friends in Saudi Arabia, girls looking for love but stymied by a system that allows them only limited freedoms and has very specific expectations and demands. There's little contact between men and women—especially single teens and adults—but modern technology has changed that a bit (leading to young men trying everything to get women to take down their cellphone numbers). The Internet is also a new medium that can't contain women and their thoughts like the old system could, and the anonymous narrator of the novel takes advantage of that: she presents her stories in the form of e-mails that she sends out weekly to any Saudi address she can find. Sex is described in this novel and the various ways it is thought of before and after marriage. Engaging in pre marital sex in the novel has negative consequences for some of the characters who face rejection as a result. The novel also features instances of arranged and failed marriages and discusses the gamble a Saudi woman takes when entering into one. Most of its 50 chapters begin with quotes from Arabic culture and sources. For example, journalists, poets, literature, songs, and the Qur'an.

The novel is written in a relatable, confessional style of writing which critics have likened to a global style of chick lit. Others have noted that the book can fit into the sub-genre of Muslim chick However, Rajaa Alsanea does not define the genre of her novel and states that she is happy to have created her own kind of genre with Girls of Riyadh.

== Character Description ==
=== Gamrah ===
Gamrah finds herself entering an arranged marriage unprepared and naive to the type of husband she has committed to following halfway across the world to Chicago. Gamrah's story discusses the gamble a Saudi woman takes entering into an arranged marriage and the consequences a Saudi woman faces when it doesn't go according to plan e.g. divorce, single parenthood.

=== Sadeem ===
Finding herself in a seemingly idyllic engagement, Sadeem is abruptly abandoned by her soon to be fiancé and is challenged by the unrealistic expectations the men in her life have for a bride to be. Like Michelle, Sadeem struggles to find a sense of place as she travels between London and Riyadh and avoids the places she has come to associate with her heartbreak. Sadeem's story focuses on creating a life for herself that is entirely her own before accepting love into her life, rather than altering her life to fit someone else's.

=== Michelle ===
Being a half-American and half-Saudi girl, Michelle is frustrated by limitations her western heritage imposes on her choices in love in Riyadh as her boyfriend's Saudi family gets in the way of their relationship. Michelle brazenly settles on defying these limitations and pursues her own professional goals in the wake of her relationship.

=== Lamees ===
Focusing on her studies in medical school, Lamees arrives late to love and only to discover the rules relationships are far more complex than she first may have thought when she falls for a Shiite Muslim boy.

=== E-Narrator ===
The narrator of the novel is the fifth member of the friendship whom the reader does not know the name of and whose story is relatively unknown compared to the other four girls. A well read, red lipstick wearing Saudi girl, the narrator sends a new email once a week after Friday for a year disclosing the secret lives of her friends.

The narrator's reporting upon the lives of the four female friends departs from the modern female Arabic narrative style in which female authors are usually presumed to write about themselves. The use of emails rather than private diary entries or letters is also different from many Western chic lit novels.

In an interview with WBEZ Chicago, Alsanea said the anonymous narrator of the book reflects how advances in technology allowed Saudi girls to have more space and freedom to live both without being judged and whilst maintaining their privacy.

== Reception and Controversy ==
Originally released in Lebanon in Arabic in 2005, Girls of Riyadh was not officially banned in Saudi Arabia but its publishing was met with resistance due to perceived controversial and non-conservative content by a female author. Rajaa Alsanea faced criticism and speculation on whether she had the help and influence of a man in the novel's writing, given its success. Alsanea carried out many interviews in Lebanon proving her authorship in response. Some critics accused the novel of pandering to western ideals while others applauded Girls of Riyadh for its refreshing stance on the Middle East that pushes back against inaccurate stereotypes while also condemning the existence of others in Saudi culture e.g. forced marriages. Alsanea faced legal action over the novel's publication which was later dismissed in court. She commented in 2007 that people would buy all the copies of the book from bookshops in order to stop its circulation. This happened at Riyadh Book Fair, which is Saudi Arabia's largest book fair.

Girls of Riyadh's popularity grew with the help of the Internet and the novel was praised by Saudi media. Black-market copies of the novel circulated and Girls of Riyadh has been a bestseller across much of the Middle East. The book was viewed by many as a 'taboo-breaking', giving insight into the inner lives and concerns of Saudi women. She successfully applied for permission to sell the novel in Saudi from Saudi Arabia's Ministry of Information. The book has attracted high-profile endorsement such as celebrated Saudi author and former ambassador to the UK Ghazi Al-Quasaibi, who wrote the prologue and praised it as 'worth reading'.

As of January 2008, English copies of Girls of Riyadh are openly available at major bookstores in Saudi Arabia. The book, published by Penguin Books, is available in the English translation, but has some changes due to difficulties of re-creating the effect of using different dialects of Arabic.

The book is widely distributed, being sold in stores from U.S. to Europe. In the reader's guider to novel, Alsanea notes that she wants to enable her Western readers to connect with Saudi culture, seeing that the girls in the novel had the 'same dreams, emotions, and goals' as them.

The English translator, Marilyn Booth, expressed dissatisfaction with the result of the translation project. According to Booth, the publishing house and author interfered with her initial translation to the detriment of the final text.
