= The Thing About Jane Spring =

2005 novel by Sharon Krum

- Author: Sharon Krum
- Language: English
- Genre: Romantic comedy
- Publisher: Century (UK); Viking Press (US)
- Publication date: July 7, 2005
- Media type: Print (Paperback)
- Pages: c. 315 pp
- ISBN: 0-670-03417-7
- OCLC: 57429345
- Dewey Decimal: 823/.92 22
- LC Class: PR9619.3.K78 T48 2005

The Thing About Jane Spring is a 2005 chick lit romantic comedy novel by Sharon Krum, known for Walk of Fame (St. Martin's Press, 2001). It was Krum's second novel, and was published in July 2005 in the United States by Viking Press and in the United Kingdom by Century, an imprint of Random House. As of 2005, publication was also planned for Italy (Arnoldo Mondadori Editore), the Netherlands (Unieboek), Russia (Amphora), and Spain (Urano).

== Plot summary ==
The plot of the novel revolves around the title character Jane Spring, an attractive and intelligent 31-year-old Manhattan assistant district attorney and West Point general's daughter who grew up without a female role model and struggles to understand why she fails to 'keep' men in a relationship. Spring is described as "militaristic", "no-nonsense", "aggressive", "abrasive", "caustic" and "tomboyish", and a "domineering hellion ... who makes old ladies cry on the stand and men run for the hills". A review in The Age characterizes Spring as the antithesis of Helen Fielding's fictional character Bridget Jones. A military brat, she prioritizes discipline and motivation and disdains 'civilians' who lack these qualities. A series of events, including overhearing her colleagues' thoughts about her and seeing a Doris Day marathon, ultimately give way to an [epiphany and prompt her to reevaluate her approach and undergo a transformation to "get in touch with her feminine side".

== Reception ==
Kirkus Reviews described The Thing About Jane Spring as "[s]mart and bracingly funny" and a "winning fable about the seemingly lost art of being a lady", and an Orlando Sentinel review commended its "nostalgic charm". A reviewer for the Connecticut Post considered the book "a smart satire of feminine behavior in two entirely different eras". Publishers Weekly called it "sprightly" and "high-concept", playwright and novelist Joanna Murray-Smith characterized it as "easy and entertaining" reading, and reviews in the Deseret Morning News and Omaha World-Herald labeled it "light-hearted". According to Booklist, the novel is a "charming modern fairy tale with all the essential chick-lit elements: witty banter, quirky secondary characters, dueling love interests, and personal makeovers". A Library Journal review, however, asserted that The Thing About Jane Spring is characterized by "one-dimensional characters, lack of setting, and [a] thin story line".

A reviewer for The Sun-Herald opined: "This funny, frothy Cinderella story is fabulously silly." A review in The Sunday Star-Times agreed, noting: "It's just plain silly. Which, ultimately, redeems it." However, a reviewer for The Cairns Post found the novel's premise to be "dated and damn irritating" and recommended it only for those who consider Doris Day to be the "epitome of womanhood". A review in The Plain Dealer offered a more mixed assessment, stating that "[w]hile Krum’s message ... hits home, it also disappoints. ... The new Jane might be a happier person, but she’s not nearly as misanthropic and interesting as her nasty old self."

== Film adaptation ==
CFP Productions, a production company established by Christine Peters, known for How to Lose a Guy in 10 Days, acquired adaptation rights to The Thing About Jane Spring for Paramount Pictures in 2005. Paramount optioned the novel for six figures. According to The Hollywood Reporter, Paramount enlisted director, producer, and screenwriter Shainee Gabel, known for A Love Song for Bobby Long, in 2006 to adapt the novel into a film.

== See also ==
- Romance novel
