= Miracle Dog =

2005 book by Randy Grim

Miracle Dog: How Quentin Survived the Gas Chamber to Speak for Animals on Death Row
- Author: Randy Grim
- Language: English
- Genre: Non-fiction
- Publisher: Blue Ribbon Books
- Publication date: February 2005
- Publication place: United States

Miracle Dog: How Quentin Survived the Gas Chamber to Speak for Animals on Death Row is a non-fiction book written by Randy Grim. Published in February 2005 by Blue Ribbon Books, the book details the story of a dog named Quentin, who survived fifteen minutes in a carbon monoxide gas chamber at the St. Louis, Missouri animal shelter in 2003. Grim, the president and founder of Stray Rescue of St. Louis, adopted the dog and used his story to campaign against the use of the gas chamber for animal euthanasia and to support no-kill animal shelters. As a result of Grim's efforts, the St. Louis animal shelter stopped using the gas chamber in January 2005, switching to more humane euthanasia methods.

== Reception ==
Ranny Green of The Seattle Times wrote of this book: "Through 30 years of reviewing pet books, I can't remember one that has left such a lasting impression..."
