= Hubert Invents the Wheel =

2005 historical novel by Claire and Monte Montgomery

- First edition cover
- Author: Claire and Monte Montgomery
- Illustrator: Jeff Shelly
- Publisher: Walker & Company
- Publication date: October 1, 2005
- ISBN: 0-8027-8990-0

Hubert Invents the Wheel is a historical novel about the invention of the wheel, developed by Claire and Monte Montgomery and illustrated by Jeff Shelly. It was published in 2005 by Walker & Company, and was named to the Texas Bluebonnet Masterlist. The story centers on a 15-year-old Sumerian boy, Hubert, who is trying to be an inventor, over the objections of his stodgy father, Gorp. Hubert succeeds in creating a wheel that revolutionizes life in Mesopotamia, but soon discovers that the new technology can be used for both good and evil.

School Library Journal's review indicates that the story is liberally sprinkled with modern concepts and references like road rage, a "new and certified pre-owned sledge dealership", and an "edifice complex". It further indicates that the book "[balances broad comic scenes with] wordplay and lively dialogue." Missouri teachers selected the book for their Reading Circle program and PBS TeacherSource recommended it, among others.
