= 50 Signs of Mental Illness =

2005 book by James Whitney Hicks

50 Signs of Mental Illness: A Guide to Understanding Mental Health
- Author: James Whitney Hicks
- Language: English
- Genre: Non-fiction
- Publisher: Yale University Press
- Publication date: 2005
- Media type: Print (Hardback)
- Pages: 416
- ISBN: 978-0-300-10657-2

50 Signs of Mental Illness: A Guide to Understanding Mental Health is a 2005 book by psychiatrist James Whitney Hicks published by Yale University Press. The book is designed as an accessible psychiatric reference for non-professionals that describes symptoms, treatments and strategies for understanding mental health.

== List of signs ==
The 50 signs covered in the book are:

1. Anger
2. Antisocial Behavior
3. Anxiety
4. Appetite disturbances
5. Avoidance
6. Body image problems
7. Compulsions
8. Confusion
9. Craving
10. Deceitfulness
11. Delusions
12. Denial
13. Depression
14. Dissociation
15. Euphoria
16. Fatigue
17. Fears
18. Flashbacks
19. Grandiosity
20. Grief
21. Hallucinations
22. Histrionics
23. Hyperactivity
24. Identity confusion
25. Impulsiveness
26. Intoxication
27. Jealousy
28. Learning difficulties
29. Mania
30. Memory loss
31. Mood swings
32. Movement problems
33. Nonsense
34. Obsessions
35. Oddness
36. Panic
37. Paranoia
38. Physical complaints and pain
39. Psychosis
40. Religious preoccupations
41. Self-esteem problems
42. Self-mutilation
43. Sexual performance problems
44. Sexual preoccupations
45. Sleep problems
46. Sloppiness
47. Speech difficulties
48. Stress
49. Suicidal thoughts
50. Psychological trauma

== Reception ==
A review in the American Journal of Psychiatry commended Hicks's phrasing of acceptable ways to speak about mental illness.

A review in The National Medical Journal of India likewise applauded the book's accessibility to non-experts, though it criticized Hicks's choice of symptoms and suggested "It would be difficult for an Indian to relate to the book" due to the examples he uses.

The book also received attention from Health, Library Journal, The Baltimore Sun, and The Washington Post.
