= Volodymyr Savchenko (writer) =

Soviet Ukrainian science fiction writer and engineer

Vladimir Ivanovich Savchenko (Ukrainian: Володимир Іванович Савченко; Russian: Владимир Иванович Савченко) was a Soviet Ukrainian science fiction writer and engineer.

Born on February 15, 1933, in Poltava, he studied at the Moscow Power Engineering Institute and was an electronics engineer. Savchenko, who wrote in Russian as well as in his native Ukrainian language, published his first short stories in the late 1950s, and his first novel (Black Stars) in 1960. His works were often self-published. Savchenko also authored several texts about physics and engineering, including the article "Sixteen New Formulas of Physics and Cosmology," which he considered to be his most important scientific text.

As of today, Savchenko's works have been published in 29 countries and have been translated into many of the world's languages.

He was found dead on January 19, 2005, in Kyiv. He was 71 years old.

== Biography ==
Savchenko was a graduate of the Moscow Power Engineering Institute. He worked at the V.M. Glushkov Institute of Cybernetics in Kyiv.

His first publication, "Toward the Stars" (1955), identified the author as an advocate of science fiction that was interested in exploring the heuristic potential of the personality. In 1956, Savchenko's story "The Awakening of Professor Bern" was published. Of publications in his native Ukrainian language, the most well-known is the story "The Ghost of Time" (1964).

In the novel Black Stars, Savchenko investigated the boundaries of traditional science, putting forward original hypotheses. In particular, Savchenko's 1959 novel The Second Expedition to the Strange Planet (known in English as The Second Oddball Expedition) explored the political nuances revealed by contact with crystalline forms of life. Savchenko positioned himself as an adherent of the cybernetic view of society and the living organism, consistently developing different aspects of the process of self-discovery. After the 1967 publication of the novel Self-Discovery, in which Savchenko warned about the ethical problems involved in the creation of clones, Savchenko occupied the leading position in Soviet science fiction.

In 1973, the twenty five-volume collection Library of Contemporary Fantastic Literature was published under the name Anthology, in which an abbreviated version of Savchenko's programmatic story "The Trial of Truth" appeared. The collection included the best publications of the largest and most popular science fiction authors of the United States, Great Britain, Japan, and France. In Savchenko's story, the protagonist, Dmitri Kaluzhnikov, makes a fundamental discovery that leads to the merging of Dmitri's individuality with an intelligent substance, with the ensuing catastrophic effect of the creation of a new Tunguska meteorite. The story became a cult text for an entire generation of young Soviet engineers.

In the late period of his work, Savchenko focused on the biological side of the phenomenon of the Übermensch, as can be seen in the story "Confused" (1983). Also widely known is the novel Over the Pass (1984), which explored the Communist future of Earth.

On Wednesday, January 19, 2005, he was found dead in his apartment in Kyiv. Since 2005, the International Assembly of Fantastic Literature Authors, which convenes every year in Kyiv under the name "Portal," has awarded a prize in Savchenko's name called "Self-Discovery" to works which shows a writer's qualitative growth.

== Literary Awards ==
- Prize at the Detgiz RSFSR contest for the novel Black Stars (1960, Moscow)
- "Chumatskii Way" prize for the story "The Kidnappers' Essences" (1989, Kyiv)
- "Great Circle" award for the novel Position in the Universe (1994)
- "Philosopher's Stone Award" (2002, "Golden Bridge" Fourth Festival of the Fantastic in Kharkiv, Ukraine)
- "Aelita" award for contribution to Russian-language fiction (2003)

== List of Works ==
=== Novels ===
- Black Stars (1956)
- Second Expedition to the Strange Planet (1959)
- Self-Discovery (1967)
- Dead End (1972)
- Meeters (Russian: Встречники) (1980)
- The Success Algorithm (1983)
- Over the Pass (1984)
- The Kidnappers' Essence (1988)
- Position in the Universe (1992)
- A Time of Great Negations (2002)

=== Expository Technical Writing ===
- Semiconductors at Launch (1958)
- Technology and Properties of Microelectronic Diode Rays (1965)
- "Sixteen new formulas of physics and cosmology. Universal correlation Field Activity (U-field), manifesting itself as universal communication variables and phenomena" (1992)

== Available Publications in English ==
- Self-Discovery. New York, McMillan, 1979. ISBN 0-02-606840-0
- Success Algorithm in New Soviet Science Fiction. New York, Collier Books, 1980. ISBN 0-02-578220-7 (hardcover) and ISBN 0-02-022650-0 (paperback)
- Mixed Up in Red Star Tales: A Century of Russian and Soviet Science Fiction. Montpelier, VT, RIS Publications, 2015. ISBN 978-1-880100-38-7
