= King of the Pygmies =

2005 novel by Jonathon Scott Fuqua

- First edition cover
- Author: Jonathon Scott Fuqua
- Language: English
- Publisher: Candlewick Press
- Publication date: 11 October 2005
- Publication place: United States
- Media type: Print
- Pages: 256 pp
- ISBN: 0-7636-1418-1

King of the Pygmies is a young adult novel that lies on the line between magic and mental illness. It is the sixth novel written by American author Jonathon Scott Fuqua, originally published in 2005 by Candlewick Press. It is about a 15-year-old boy, Penrod "Penn" Swayne, and the troubles that he faces when he starts hearing the thoughts of the people that are close to him.

== Plot summary ==
Penn is an average American high school boy living in the small town of Havre de Grace, Maryland. He has a crush on the new girl at school, Daisy. He looks out for his older brother, Matt, who has had brain damage from birth. Penn is on his way to a successful life.

All of this changes when he starts hearing voices.

He learns of the worries that his brother does not voice out loud, the depression that his neighbor is fighting, and the quiet struggles that his parents face each day.

After Penn shares the details of being able to hear people's thoughts, his mother forces him to see a psychiatrist as she suspects that he has schizophrenia. He desperately tries to show his father that he is not mentally ill and takes him to see his Uncle Hewitt, who had convinced Penn that he too could read people's minds. Unfortunately, his uncle could not correctly guess the thoughts of Penn's father, and both Penn and Hewitt are left looking as if they are not mentally stable.

Penn is let down by his uncle again after he promised that a man would come and see him and explain the Pygmy disease, which causes the ability to hear the thoughts of other people. The man does not show up, leaving Penn unsure whether his uncle can truly hear the thoughts of other people and even creating doubts concerning Penn's mental state as well as whether he has magical powers or is actually mentally unstable.
