= George O. Abell =

American astronomer (1927–1983)

- Born: George Ogden Abell; March 27, 1927; Los Angeles, California, U.S.
- Died: October 7, 1983 (aged 56); Los Angeles, California, U.S.
- Education: B.S. (1951), M.S. (1952); PhD (1957) California Institute of Technology (B.S., M.S., and PhD)
- Spouse: Phyllis (second marriage)
- Children: 2 sons (first marriage)
- Scientific career
- Fields: Astronomy
- Workplaces: University of California, Los Angeles
- Doctoral advisor: Donald Osterbrock
- Doctoral students: Edwin C. Krupp

George Ogden Abell (March 27, 1927 – October 7, 1983) was an American astronomer and professor. He taught at UCLA, primarily as a research astronomer. He earned his B.S. in 1951, his M.S. in 1952 and his Ph.D. in 1957, all from Caltech. He was a Ph.D. student under Donald Osterbrock. His astronomy career began as a tour guide at the Griffith Observatory in Los Angeles. Abell made great contributions to astronomical knowledge which resulted from his work during and after the National Geographic Society - Palomar Observatory Sky Survey, especially concerning clusters of galaxies and planetary nebulae. A galaxy, an asteroid, a periodic comet, and an observatory are all named in his honor. His teaching career extended beyond the campus of UCLA to the high school student oriented Summer Science Program, and educational television. He not only taught about science but also about what is not science. He was an originating member of the Committee on Scientific Investigation of Claims of the Paranormal now known as the Committee for Skeptical Inquiry.

== Early life ==
George Ogden Abell was born in Los Angeles on March 1, 1927, to Theodore Curtis Abell and Annamarie (Ogden) Abell. Theodore Abell was born in Waterbury, Connecticut, in 1890, was a Unitarian minister, and was one of the original members of the Hollywood Humanist Society. Annamarie was born in Kansas City, Missouri, in 1896, and studied to be a librarian, worked for a short while as a librarian but eventually became a social worker. George Ogden Abell was named for his mother's brother, George Ogden.

Theodore and Annamarie divorced when Abell was 6 years old. Annamarie and son went to live with her father, also George Ogden, who was an author of western novels. Theodore maintained regular contact with Abell and took him to many museums and to Griffith Observatory and planetarium when he was about 8, soon after it opened. This prompted Abell to start reading books on astronomy. Abell attended Van Nuys High School where he achieved all As in all math and science courses that he took.

As a youth, Abell held many part-time jobs, he had a newspaper delivery as well as mail route, worked in a bowling alley, a restaurant, grocery store, and did home maintenance work.

== Military service ==
Abell enlisted in the US Army Air Corps after he graduated from high school in 1945 in the waning days of World War II. He took the tests that qualified him for training as a pilot, navigator or bombardier, but the war ended and those schools were shut down before he could begin training.

Instead, he went to weather school at Chanute Field in Illinois. On finishing that, he had the option of staying at Chanute Field to attend forecasting school, but that would have entailed becoming an officer and staying in the Army longer. Since the war was over, getting out of the Army as soon as possible seemed more important to him, so he opted to forego forecasting school. Instead he was sent to Japan, where he served as an Air Corps weatherman for six months before being discharged after 18 months of total service.

== Education ==
Upon leaving the Air Corps, Abell returned to Los Angeles and worked as a gas station attendant while waiting to start school at the California Institute of Technology (Caltech). At Caltech, Abell studied physics his freshman year. However, the next year Caltech inaugurated its astronomy department and as a sophomore he switched majors to astronomy. As an undergraduate student, Abell lived in Caltech's Fleming House and bowled on the Fleming House bowling team. Abell participated in the Drama Club, and was president of the club for one year. He also wrote the music column for Caltech's weekly newspaper, The California Tech, and worked at Griffith Observatory as a guide while an undergrad student.

Abell received his Bachelor of Science degree in astronomy in 1951. He then continued at Caltech for graduate studies in astronomy. He received a Master of Science in 1952 and a Ph.D. in 1957. He was the first Ph.D. student of Donald Osterbrock. During his graduate student days he worked at Griffith Observatory as a lecturer.

== Career ==
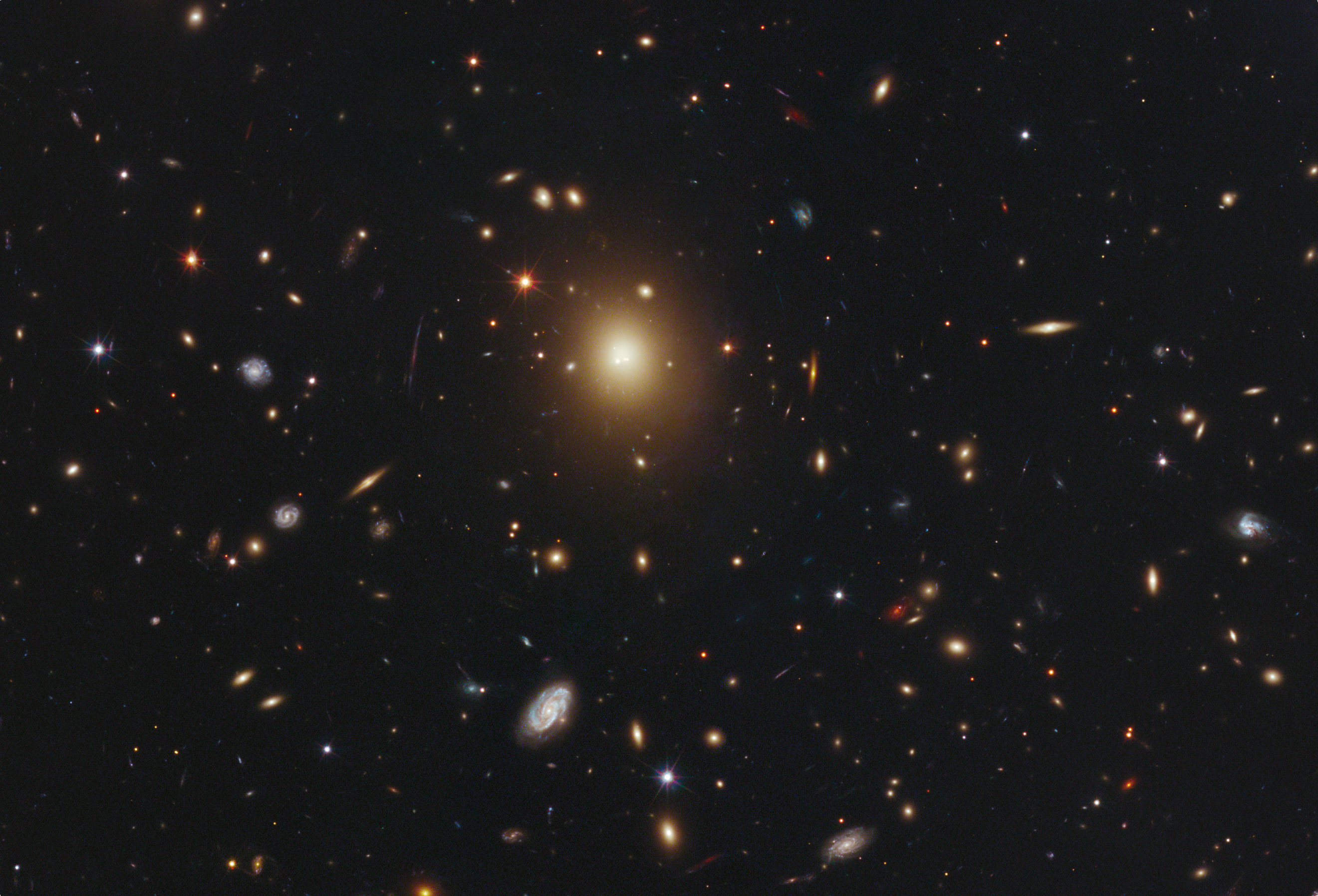
Abell 2261 is one galaxy cluster from his catalogue of clusters of galaxies, collected during the National Geographic Society - Palomar Observatory Sky Survey.

=== Palomar sky survey ===
Abell's first professional astronomical occupation came as a Caltech graduate student when he was an observer on the National Geographic Society – Palomar Observatory Sky Survey. Several scientific advances came out of this work including,

- The Abell catalog of 2,712 rich clusters of galaxies, which include Abell 68.
- The recognition of second order clusters of the clusters of galaxies, which also disproved Carl Charlier's hierarchical model.
- The study of luminosity of clusters showing how they can be used for determination of relative distances.
- A list of 86 planetary nebulae which includes Abell 39.
- Recognition that planetary nebulae derive from red giant stars, (Note: This conclusion later confirmed by many investigations.) together with Peter Goldreich, of UCLA,
- With Robert G. Harrington discovered periodic comet 52P/Harrington-Abell.

An extended version of the clusters of galaxies catalogue was published after Abell's death in 1987 under the authorship of Abell, Harold G. Corwin and Ronald P. Olowin. This extended catalog includes clusters seen from the southern hemisphere, lists approximately 4,000 clusters of galaxies and includes thirty members with a redshift up to z = 0.2. (See List of Abell clusters.)

=== Teaching ===
==== UCLA ====
Abell taught at the University of California, Los Angeles (UCLA) for 17 years. He believed that the cornerstone of teaching science is to present how and why the facts are known to be facts; and not in the mere presentation of facts that might amaze, sensationalize, entertain but not enlighten the listener.

Abell chaired the UCLA Astronomy Department for seven years 1968 to 1975. He also served on several university committees and commissions, such as,

- Faculty Senate
  - Committee on Parking and Transportation (1959)
  - Chairman of the Graduate Council (1964–1965)
  - Chairman of the Committee on Athletics (1968–1969)
  - Chairman of the Los Angeles Division (1972–1973)

During the period of student unrest in the 1960s Abell was an active member and organizer of the unofficial Committee for Responsible University Government. This was due to his belief that faculty and administration standards were weakening as a result of the unrest.

==== Summer science program ====
Abell was a leader and teacher in the Summer Science Program for talented high school students. At Thatcher School in Ojai, California, he and others taught college-level physics, mathematics and astronomy to these students. A number of them went on to pursue distinguished careers in science. One such is Ed Krupp the long-time director of Griffith Observatory in Los Angeles. Others include Mitch Kapor, founder of Lotus Development, and Franklin Antonio, cofounder of Qualcomm.

==== Other teaching methods ====
Abell also lectured at other venues, specifically at many small colleges that lacked astronomy departments. He also strove to bring the stories of science and astronomy to the people through public lectures.

He wrote several books including Exploration of the Universe a textbook widely used in undergraduate astronomy courses.

He helped produce educational TV programs/series such as Project Universe and Understanding Space and Time. He also appeared in some of these as himself, an astronomer. Project Universe was a 30 part introductory course on astronomy that featured Ed Krupp director of Griffith Observatory in Los Angeles. Abell and Julian Schwinger created Understanding Space and Time in 16 parts to explain in layman's terms celestial mechanics, relativity, and the large scale structure of the universe.

=== Skepticism ===
Abell was not just a teacher of astronomy and science, he also taught about popular topics with no scientific evidence. He was a debunker of astrology, pseudoscience, and the occult. In a tribute to Abell in The Quarterly Journal of the Royal Astronomical Society, Lawrence H. Aller wrote,

As many astronomers do not, George recognized that the great enemy of enlightenment was not just ignorance, but the delusions and gullibility of vast masses of humanity and their willingness – nay, eagerness – to be taken in by frauds ranging from pseudoscientific claptrap (“Worlds in Collision”, the Bermuda Triangle, ancient astronauts, the Atlantis myth, etc.) to astrology, the occult arts and witchcraft. What is astonishing is the inability of many otherwise literate people to recognize the strong hold of superstition upon them and their penchant for accepting the claims of charlatans at face value. Given these conditions, the magnitude of the task of combating astrology, witchcraft, and pseudoscience is staggering.

His opposition to such forces took many forms, in writings, and in television appearances. He was one of the co-founders of the Committee on Scientific Investigation of Claims of the Paranormal now known as CSI, the Committee for Skeptical Inquiry. James Randi, the magician and founder of the CSI, was Abell's friend, and a frequent lecturer at the Summer Science Program.

Abell was a contributor to the organization's journal Skeptical Inquirer.

== Astronomical namesakes ==
There are several astronomical bodies named for George Abell, as well as an earthbound observatory. (Note: With the exception of The Abell Galaxy, this list contains only items actually named for Abell. It does not contain items listed in either the Abell Catalog of clusters of galaxies or the Abell List of planetary nebulae. It is customary to refer to those items as Abell and the correct number from the catalog or list. Those designations do not indicate the items are named for Abell. Only that they are contained in the catalog/list that he compiled.)

- The Abell Galaxy, which, for many years, was the largest known astronomical object.
- Asteroid (3449) Abell
- Periodic comet 52P/Harrington-Abell, which Abell co-discovered with Robert Harrington
- George Abell Observatory, Open University, Milton Keynes, United Kingdom

== Affiliations ==
- American Astronomical Society
  - Councilor 1969-1972
  - Education Committee, Chairman
- Astronomical Society of the Pacific
  - President 1969-1971
  - Member Board of Directors 1982-1984
- Royal Astronomical Society, elected a Fellow in 1970
- International Astronomical Union
  - Cosmology Commission, President
    - Organized symposia on the large-scale structure of the universe
      - UCLA – 1979
      - Crete – 1982
- American Association for the Advancement of Science, Member of the governing board
- Summer Science Program (Note: SSP remembers his service through its Abell Scholarship Fund.)
  - Academic Director 1960–1983
  - Guest speaker in other years

== Personal life ==
Abell was married twice. The first marriage occurred right after his graduation from Caltech. His first wife was a school teacher and they had two sons together named Anthony and Jonathan. This marriage ended after 19 years with the sons remaining with their father. Abell's second wife, Phyllis, was a painter who studied three years at the Philadelphia Museum School of Art but did not graduate.

Abell enjoyed many hobbies during his lifetime such as, softball, bowling, music concerts and grand opera (on which he was considered an authority), record collecting, and literature. He was an avid baseball fan, frequently in attendance at Los Angeles Dodgers games.

Abell died at home on October 7, 1983, after suffering a heart attack.

== Selected published works ==
- Abell, George O.; Osterbrock, Donald E. (1957). The Distribution of Rich Clusters of Galaxies. Chicago, Illinois: University of Chicago Press. OCLC 436995543. (PhD Thesis)
- Abell, George O. (1958). Astronomy for Everybody. Los Angeles, California: Trend Books. p. 128. OCLC 10081142.
- Abell, George O. (1 November 1958). Radiance of Rocket Engine Flames at Low Atmospheric Density. Fort Belvoir, Virginia: Defense Technical Information Center. p. 38. OCLC 227362134.
- Abell, George O. (1960). Extragalactic Distances by Luminosity Methods. Los Angeles, California: University of California. OCLC 907716439.
- Abell, George O. (1961). Evidence Regarding Second-order Clustering of Galaxies and Interactions Between Clusters of Galaxies. Los Angeles, California: University of California. OCLC 907716450.
- Abell, George O. (1982) [1964]. Exploration of the universe. Philadelphia: Saunders. ISBN 978-0-03-058502-9. OCLC 751368265.
- Abell, George O. (1965). Clustering of Galaxies. Los Angeles, California: University of California. OCLC 907716717.
- Abell, George O. (3 June 1965). Rich Clusters of Galaxies. Fort Belvoir, Virginia: Defense Technical Information Center. OCLC 227665508.
- Abell, George O.; Goldreich, Peter (1966). On the Origin of Planetary Nebulae. Los Angeles, California: University of California. OCLC 907716612.
- Abell, George O.; Mihalas, Dimitri (1966). Procedure of Photometry for Elliptical Galaxies. Los Angeles, California: University of California. OCLC 907716412.
- Abell, George (1970). Instructor's Manual for Exploration of the Universe. New York: Holt, Rinehart & Winston. p. 240. ISBN 978-0-03-089666-8. OCLC 636766723.
- Abell, George (1970). Solutions Manual for Exploration of the Universe. New York: Holt, Rinehart & Winston. p. 132. OCLC 61249669.
- Abell, George O.; Müller, Edith A. (1970). A List of Astronomy Educational Material. Versoix, Canton of Geneva, Switzerland: Geneva Observatory. OCLC 22187985.
- Abell, George O. (1972). Problems Concerning the Extragalactic Distance Scale. Los Angeles, California: University of California. OCLC 907730247.
- Abell, George O. (1974). The Extragalactic Relative Distance Scale. Los Angeles, California: University of California. OCLC 907730914.
- Abell, George O. (1974). Astrology: Its Principles and Relation and Nonrelation to Science. Los Angeles, California: University of California. OCLC 907731011.
- Abell, George O. (1974). Superclustering of Galaxies. Los Angeles, California: University of California. OCLC 907731002.
- Abell, George O. (1974). Clusters of galaxies. Los Angeles, California: University of California. OCLC 907731140.
- Abell, George Ogden (1976). Realm of the universe. New York: Holt, Rinehart & Winston. p. 431. ISBN 978-0-03-014996-2. OCLC 494612961.
- Abell, George O. (1977). The Luminosity Function and Structure of the Coma Cluster. Los Angeles, California: University of California. OCLC 907730637.
- Abell, George Ogden (1978). Drama of the Universe. New York: Holt, Rinehart & Winston. pp. 456. ISBN 978-0-03-022401-0. OCLC 832588778.
- Abell, George O. (1978). Instructor's Manual for Drama of the Universe. New York: Holt, Rinehart & Winston. p. 101. ISBN 978-0-03-039231-3. OCLC 6676725.
- Abell, George Ogden (1980). Objects of High Redshift: International Astronomical Union Symposium No. 92, held in Los Angeles, August 28-31, 1979. Dordrecht, Netherlands: D. Reidel. p. 340. ISBN 978-9-02-771118-2. OCLC 715490723.
- Abell, George Ogden; Singer, Barry (1981). Science and the Paranormal: Probing the Existence of the Supernatural. New York: Scribner. pp. 414. ISBN 978-0-68-416655-1. OCLC 636372463.
- Abell, George Ogden; Chincarini, Guido (1983). Early Evolution of the Universe and Its Present Structure: International Astronomical Union Symposium No. 104 Held in Kolymbari, Crete, August 30 - September 2, 1982. Dordrecht, Netherlands: D. Reidel. p. 536. ISBN 978-9-02-771653-8. OCLC 889494410.
- Abell, George Ogden; Corwin, Harold G.; Olowin, Ronald P. (1989). A Catalog of Rich Clusters of Galaxies. Chicago, Illinois: University of Chicago Press. p. 138. OCLC 490447720.

== Journal articles ==
- Abell, G. O. (1955). "Globular Clusters and Planetary Nebulae Discovered on the National Geographic Society-Palomar Observatory Sky Survey". Publications of the Astronomical Society of the Pacific. 67 (397): 258–261. Bibcode:1955PASP...67..258A. doi:10.1086/126815.
- Abell, George O. (1957). "The Distribution of Rich Clusters of Galaxies" (PDF). The Astronomical Journal. 62: 2. Bibcode:1957AJ.....62Q...2A. doi:10.1086/107564. ISSN 0004-6256. OCLC 4649249623. Archived from the original (PDF) on 2018-07-21.
- Abell, George O. (1 October 1959). "Activities of the Society: The San Francisco Meeting of the Astronomical Society of the Pacific". Publications of the Astronomical Society of the Pacific. 71 (422): 481–483. Bibcode:1959PASP...71..481A. doi:10.1086/127435. ISSN 0004-6280. OCLC 5547667227.
- Abell, George O. (1 December 1959). "Three-Color Observations of a Flare on AD Leonis". Publications of the Astronomical Society of the Pacific. 71 (423): 517–521. Bibcode:1959PASP...71..517A. doi:10.1086/127441. ISSN 0004-6280. OCLC 5547672709.
- Abell, George O. (December 1959). "The San Francisco Meeting of the Astronomical Society of the Pacific". Publications of the Astronomical Society of the Pacific. 71 (422): 481. Bibcode:1959PASP...71..481A. doi:10.1086/127435. ISSN 0004-6280. OCLC 4641408269.
- Abell, George O. (May 1959). "The Luminosity Function of the Coma Cluster of Galaxies". The Astronomical Journal. 64: 125. Bibcode:1959AJ.....64..125A. doi:10.1086/107894. ISSN 0004-6256. OCLC 4649258399.
- Abell, George O. (1 February 1960). "Book Review: Astronomy". Publications of the Astronomical Society of the Pacific. 72 (424): 65–66. Bibcode:1960PASP...72...65.. doi:10.1086/127482. ISSN 0004-6280. OCLC 5547695194.
- Abell, George O. (August 1960). "Extragalactic Distances by Luminosity Methods". Publications of the Astronomical Society of the Pacific. 72 (429): 459. Bibcode:1960PASP...72..459A. doi:10.1086/127577. ISSN 0004-6280. OCLC 4641412356. S2CID 120498701.
- Abell, George O.; Petrie, R. M.; Zwicky, F (1 December 1960). "The Astronomical Distance Scale: A Symposium". Publications of the Astronomical Society of the Pacific. 72 (429): 459–468. Bibcode:1960PASP...72..459A. doi:10.1086/127577. ISSN 0004-6280. OCLC 5547678707. S2CID 120498701.
- Abell, George O. (1 August 1969). "Award of the Bruce Gold Medal to Dr. Horace W. Babcock". Publications of the Astronomical Society of the Pacific. 81 (480): 179–184. Bibcode:1969PASP...81..179A. doi:10.1086/128761. ISSN 0004-6280. OCLC 5547681549. S2CID 121851209.
- Abell, George O. (December 1961). "Evidence Regarding Second-order Clustering of Galaxies and Interactions Between Clusters of Galaxies". The Astronomical Journal. 66: 607. Bibcode:1961AJ.....66..607A. doi:10.1086/108472. ISSN 0004-6256. OCLC 4649278308.
- Abell, G. O. (1966). "Properties of Some Old Planetary Nebulae". Astrophysical Journal. 144: 259. Bibcode:1966ApJ...144..259A. doi:10.1086/148602.
- Abell, George O. (1 June 1970). "Award of the Bruce Gold Medal to Professor Fred Hoyle". Publications of the Astronomical Society of the Pacific. 82 (487): 567–572. Bibcode:1970PASP...82..567A. doi:10.1086/128934. ISSN 0004-6280. OCLC 5547684655. S2CID 119833910.
- Abell, George O. (1 December 1974). "Astrology: Its Principles and Relation and Nonrelation to Science". The Science Teacher. 41 (9). National Science Teachers Association: 9–13. ISSN 0036-8555. OCLC 5919376587.
- Ransom, C. J.; Abell, George O. (December 1978). "More on Velikovsky". Physics Today. 31 (12). American Institute of Physics: 81–82. Bibcode:1978PhT....31l..81R. doi:10.1063/1.2994898. ISSN 0031-9228. OCLC 4636479454.
- Abell, George O. (January 1979). "On Second Reading". Physics Today. 32 (1). American Institute of Physics: 94. Bibcode:1979PhT....32a..94A. doi:10.1063/1.2995379. ISSN 0031-9228. OCLC 4636492785.

He was slated to take over as editor of the Astronomical Journal effective January 1, 1984, but his death occurred before that appointment became effective.

== Filmography ==
- George O. Abell (educational consultant) (1960). How We Know the Earth's Shape (film). Los Angeles, California: Films Associates of California. OCLC 42494371.
- George O. Abell (educational consultant) (1960). Asteroids, Comets, and Meteorites (film). Los Angeles, California: Films Associates of California. OCLC 5951697.
- George Abell, L. G. Stoddard (educational consultants) (1965). What is an Eclipse? (film). Los Angeles, California: Films Associates of California. OCLC 2328634.
- George O. Abell (supervisor) (1965). Solar Prominences (film). Los Angeles, California: Films Associates of California. OCLC 5603406.
- George O. Abell (supervisor) (1965). Eclipse of the Sun (film). Los Angeles, California: Films Associates of California. OCLC 5603409.
- George O. Abell (supervisor) (1965). Eclipse of the Moon (film). Los Angeles, California: Films Associates of California. OCLC 5603413.
- George O. Abell (supervisor) (1965). Mars and Jupiter (film). Los Angeles, California: Films Associates of California. OCLC 7304158.
- George O. Abell (supervisor) (1965). Comet Orbits (film). Los Angeles, California: Films Associates of California. OCLC 7304176.
- George O. Abell, Edward K.L. Upton (consultants) (1966). How We Study the Sun (film). Los Angeles, California: Films Associates of California. OCLC 7185321.
- George O. Abell (consultant) (1976). Probing the Universe (film). Whittier, California: Moody Institute of Science. OCLC 34847312.
- George O. Abell (writer/consultant) (1976). Astronomy: Expander of the Mind (film). Whittier, California: Moody Institute of Science. OCLC 221890068.
- George O. Abell (educational consultant) (1977). How We Know the Earth Moves (film). Santa Monica, California: BFA Educational media. OCLC 4423406.
- Paul Kurtz, George Ogden Abell (writers) (1977). Man's Place in the Universe (film). Amherst, New York: American Humanist Association. OCLC 691509262.
- Ed Krupp (presenter), George O. Abell (production assistance) (1978). Project Universe:An Introduction to Astronomy (film (30 episode TV series)). Huntington Beach, California: KOCE-TV, Coast Community College District. OCLC 9765283.
- George O. Abell (writing/production), Julian Schwinger (writing). Understanding Space and Time (film (16 episode TV series)).

== See also ==
- List of Abell clusters
- List of astronomers § G. O. Abell
- Abell catalogue
- Category:Abell objects
- Abell Catalog of Planetary Nebulae

== Obituaries ==
- JRASC 77 (1983) L85
- QJRAS 30 (1989) 283
- University of California: In Memoriam, 1985
