= 52P/Harrington–Abell =

Periodic comet with 7 year orbit

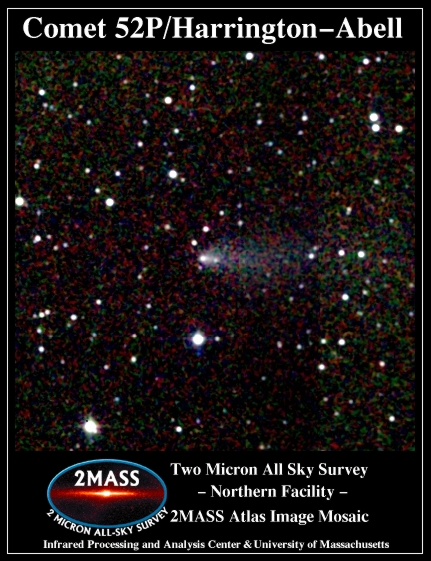
- Comet Harrington–Abell photographed by the 2MASS survey in 1998

Discovery
- Discovered by: Robert G. Harrington; George O. Abell
- Discovery site: Palomar Observatory
- Discovery date: 22 March 1955

Designations
- MPC designation: P/1955 F1; P/1962 B1
- Alternative designations: 1954 XIII; 1962 II; 1969 III; 1976 VIII; 1983 XVII; 1991 X

Orbital characteristics
- Epoch: 6 March 2006
- Aphelion: 5.932 AU
- Perihelion: 1.757 AU
- Semi-major axis: 3.844 AU
- Eccentricity: 0.5429
- Orbital period: 7.538 years
- Inclination: 10.2204°
- Last perihelion: October 5, 2021; March 7, 2014; August 14, 2006
- Next perihelion: 2029-May-10

Physical characteristics
- Dimensions: 2.6 km (1.6 mi)
- Comet total magnitude (M1): 11.8
- Comet nuclear magnitude (M2): 15.5
- Apparent magnitude: 17–22 (typical brightness); 10.9–11.8 (1998 apparition)

52P/Harrington–Abell is a periodic comet in the Solar System.

It was discovered by Robert G. Harrington and George O. Abell in 1955 on plates from the Palomar Sky Survey taken with the 49-inch Samuel Oschin telescope.

It has been seen on every apparition since then. With a period of about seven years, it has been seen close to its perihelia in 1954, 1962, 1969, 1976, 1983, 1991, and 2006. Its orbital period changed from 7.2 to 7.6 years when it passed 0.04 AU from Jupiter in April, 1974. It typically gets no brighter than about magnitude 17.

In 1998/1999, it was unexpectedly bright. When recovered on July 21, 1998, by Alain Maury, he expected it to be about magnitude 21 or 22. Instead, he found it to be thousands of times brighter at magnitude 12.2. The next night, its brightness was estimated by others at magnitude 10.9 to 11.8. It may have had a second outburst about 80 days before perihelion. It finally faded to dimmer than magnitude 12 by the end of March, 1999.

At its return in 2006, it returned to normal brightness.

Numbered comets
Previous; 51P/Harrington	52P/Harrington–Abell	Next; 53P/Van Biesbroeck
