= Litsa Kouroupaki =

Greek politician

Litsa Kouroupaki MP

Member of the Hellenic Parliament
- Incumbent
- Assumed office 9 September 2010
- President: Karolos Papoulias
- Prime Minister: George Papandreou

Personal details
- Born: 1964
- Party: Panhellenic Socialist Movement
- Education: National and Kapodistrian University of Athens
- Profession: Politician

Litsa Kouroupaki (Greek: Λίτσα Κουρουπάκη, born in 1964) is a Greek politician and member of the Hellenic Parliament for the Panhellenic Socialist Movement (PASOK).

== Life ==
Litsa Kouroupaki studied at the School of Dentistry of the National and Kapodistrian University of Athens, graduating in 1988.

Litsa Kouroupaki was a member of PASP, the youth wing of PASOK during her studies and became a member of PASOK itself since 1982. Within PASOK, she has been active in the health, volunteerism, immigration policy and human rights sections for the Athens party organization, and is a member of the Secretariat of the party section for the Greek diaspora.
