= Ed Krupp =

American astronomer

Edwin Charles Krupp
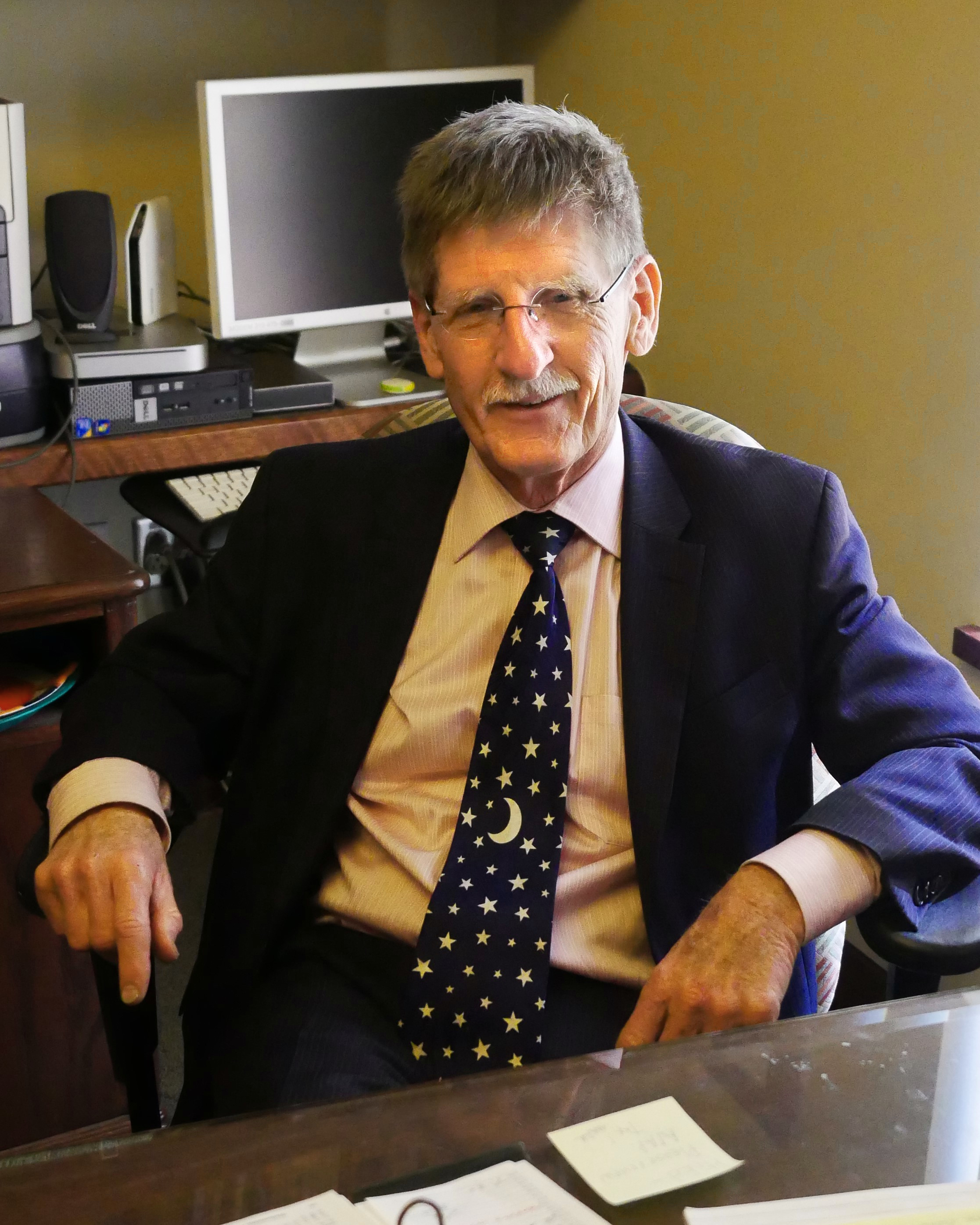
- Ed Krupp in his Griffith Observatory office
- Born: November 18, 1944 (age 81); Chicago, Illinois
- Other names: Ed, E.C.
- Education: B.A. Physics/Astronomy (1966), M.A. Astronomy (1968); PhD Astronomy (1972)
- Alma mater: Pomona College (B.A.), University of California, Los Angeles (M.A. and PhD)
- Spouse: Robin Rector Krupp (m. 1968; div. 2006)
- Children: 1 son
- Awards: Klumpke-Roberts Award (1989); Andrew Gemant Award (2013)
- Scientific career
- Fields: Astronomy, Astronomy and Culture
- Workplaces: Griffith Observatory
- Doctoral advisor: George O. Abell
- Other academic advisors: Robert J. Chambers
- Ed Krupp Voice recorded in 2017

Edwin Charles Krupp (born November 18, 1944) is an American astronomer, researcher, author, and popularizer of science. He is an internationally recognized expert in the field of archaeoastronomy, the study of how ancient cultures viewed the sky and how those views affected their cultures. He has taught at the college level, as a planetarium lecturer, and in various documentary films. He has been the director of the Griffith Observatory in Los Angeles since first taking over the position in 1974 after the departure of the previous director, William J. Kaufmann III. His writings include science papers and journal articles, astronomy magazine articles, books on astronomy and archaeoastronomy for adults, and books explaining sky phenomena and astronomy to children.

Krupp is a member of the American Astronomical Society and the International Astronomical Union, and has served in several divisions and commissions of both organizations. He is also a fellow of the Committee for Skeptical Inquiry and a member of that organization's Council for Media Integrity.

== Early life ==
Edwin Charles Krupp was born in Chicago, Illinois, on November 18, 1944 where as a child his parents took him to many of the local museums. In 1956 the family moved to Los Angeles where Krupp's father, a mechanical engineer, worked on the Apollo program and then on the Space Shuttle.

== Education ==
In 1961 Krupp attended the Summer Science Program (SSP). Among other things, SSP teaches astronomy to high school students. Krupp has remained active with SSP, first as a graduate student teaching assistant from 1968 to 1972 and later as a frequent guest lecturer. Krupp has said of SSP,

In some respects, SSP remains the most academically cohesive and intense educational experience I have ever had. That, I suspect, is true for most who are fortunate enough to attend it. If it weren't for SSP, my vision would be narrower, my aspirations less ambitious, and my life less rich. I don't exaggerate.

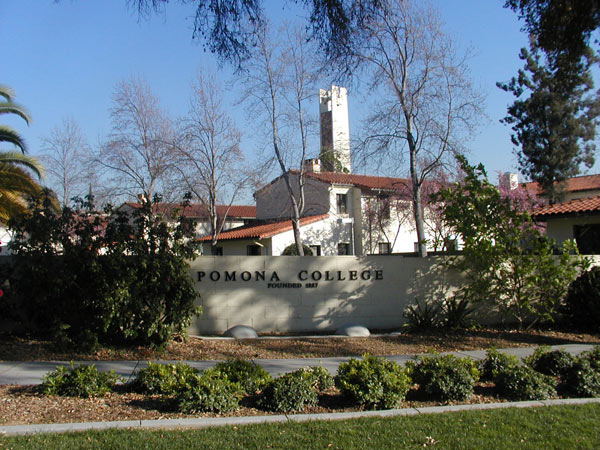
Pomona College

Krupp studied physics and astronomy at Pomona College (the founding member of the Claremont Colleges consortium) in Claremont, California. His undergraduate advisor was Robert J. Chambers. While studying at Pomona College, Krupp participated in cross-country, track, and soccer. He also worked at KSPC, the Pomona College non-commercial community radio station. He lived for two years at the Brackett Observatory, during this time he served as caretaker of the observatory, weatherman, and telescope demonstrator. He received a Bachelor of Arts degree in 1966.

Krupp pursued graduate studies in astronomy at the University of California, Los Angeles (UCLA), receiving a Master of Arts degree in 1968 and PhD in 1972. His Ph.D. dissertation concerned the morphology of rich clusters of galaxies. His graduate adviser was George O. Abell. (Note: George Abell was Academic Advisor to the Summer Science Program when Krupp attended as a high school student.)

== Career ==
=== Teaching ===
Krupp began his teaching career as a teaching assistant for the Summer Science Program during his graduate school days. Also, during graduate school he taught at the following education institutions:

- El Camino College
- University of Southern California
- University of California, Los Angeles

He became a planetarium lecturer at Griffith Observatory while also still in graduate school. Krupp has been a frequent lecturer throughout his career. He has lectured on science based tours he has led and other venues.

=== Griffith Observatory ===
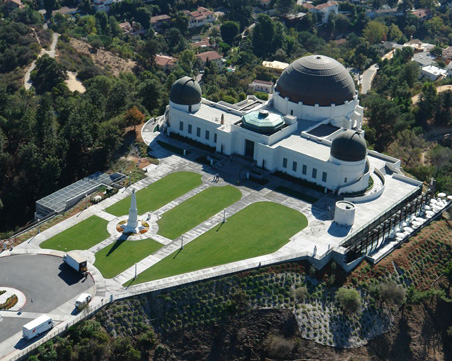
An aerial view of Griffith Observatory on the south facing slope of Mount Hollywood in Griffith Park, Los Angeles

Krupp took his first job at Griffith Observatory in Los Angeles (Note: Both Griffith Observatory and Griffith Park where the observatory is located were given to the city of Los Angeles by Griffith J. Griffith a wealthy Los Angeles businessman.) while he was still a doctoral candidate at UCLA. This was as a part-time planetarium lecturer and Krupp did not enjoy this job at first, saying to his wife Robin, "Gee this isn't science, It's showbusiness." But, after he started noticing the audiences responding with increasing enthusiasm he started saying, "Hey, this is showbusiness."

Krupp was appointed Observatory Curator in 1972 upon completion of his PhD. In 1974 the director of Griffith Observatory, William J. Kaufmann III, left, and Krupp was appointed acting director. In 1976 Krupp's title was changed from "acting" director to director.

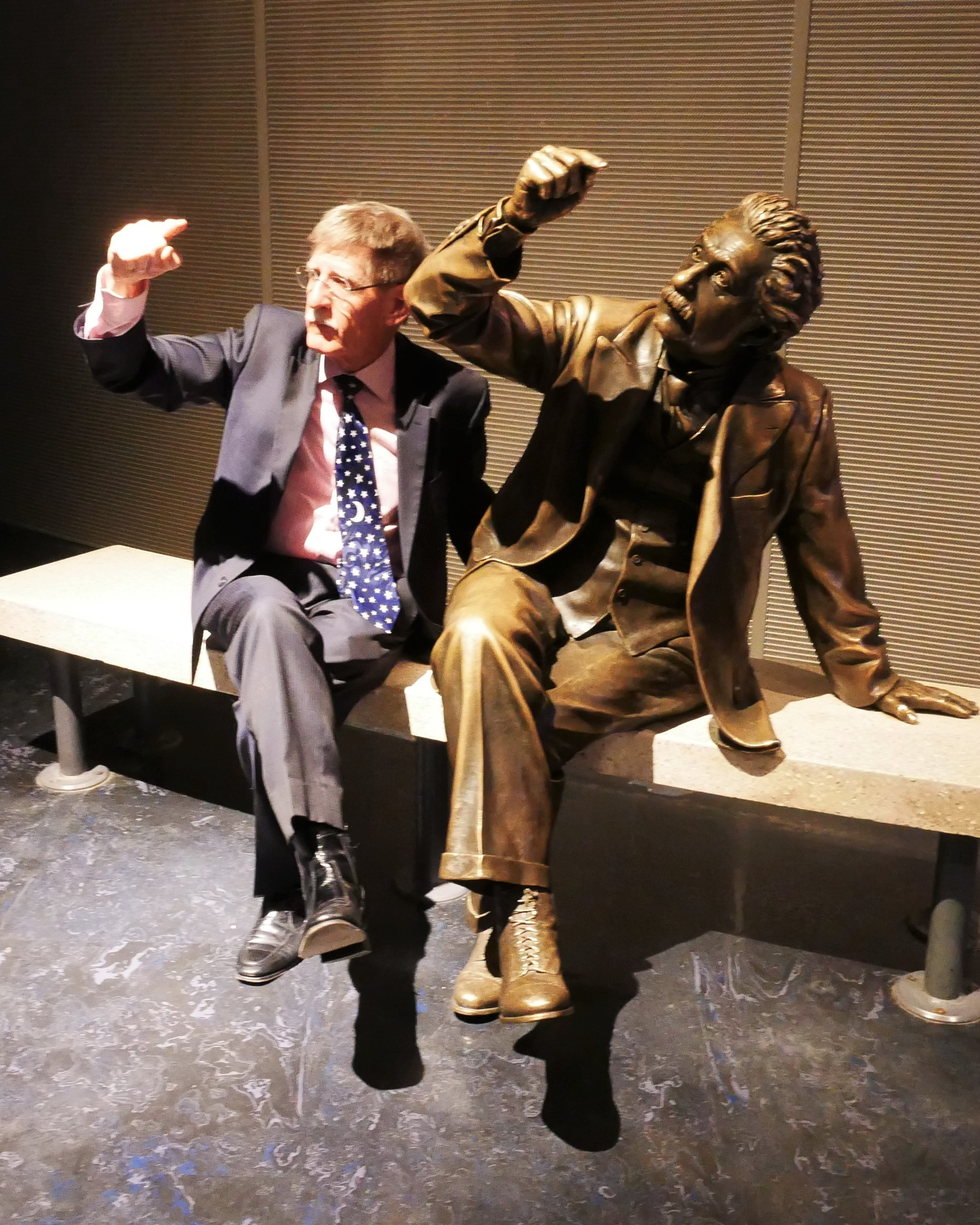
Ed Krupp with an Albert Einstein statue at Griffith Observatory

As early as 1978 Krupp was aware that the observatory would need a future restoration and that there was a need to update equipment and exhibits. So he and Harold and Debra Griffith (Note: Harold Griffith was the grandson of Griffith J. Griffith. Debra was his wife. Griffith J. Griffith was the wealthy businessman that donated both Griffith Park and the Griffith Observatory within the park to the city of Los Angeles.) co-founded the Friends of the Observatory (FOTO). FOTO aids the mission of the observatory in many ways. FOTO partnered with the city to renovate and expand the observatory raising US$30 million for the effort ($26 million in private funds). The observatory closed its doors in 2002 for the $93 Million dollar renovation and expansion. The entire project was spearheaded by Krupp, and the observatory reopened in the fall of 2006.

Krupp often appears in the media to discuss and explain developments and recent discoveries in astronomy, as well as discuss current celestial events.

In 2014 Griffith Observatory had its 80th anniversary and Krupp his 40th as observatory director. At that time, John Ashton of Sunseeker Tours in Long Beach noted, "It's an L.A. treasure. We get more requests to see this than anything." And, then LA City Councilman Tom LaBonge (whose district included the observatory) observed:

There are many, many, many very special public employees, but there's only one Dr. Edwin C. Krupp. Not only does he have the greatest building in the city. He's got the universe.

=== Archaeoastronomy ===
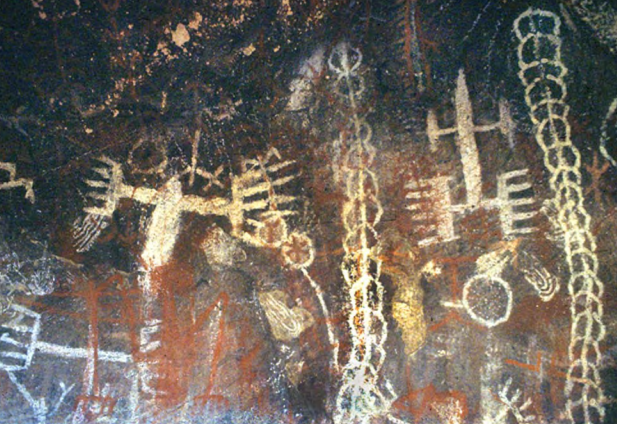
Burro Flats Pictographs in the Simi Hills of Southern California

Krupp has a special interest in the impact of astronomy on ancient belief systems, and is an internationally recognized expert on traditional astronomies. He is noted for his many contributions to the field on which he has written extensively, and he has visited, and studied, nearly 2,000 prehistoric, and historic sites around the world.

Krupp has traveled around the world for his archaeoastronomy studies. These trips have also taken him to sites close to home such as the Burro Flats pictograph site in the Simi Hills of Southern California, which he first visited in 1979. Over the years, Krupp has made semi-regular trips to that site to conduct solstice observations.

Krupp has shared his studies of archaeoastronomy with the general public by including archaeoastronomy topics in Griffith Observatory planetarium programs, writing books and magazine articles, appearing in documentary films, and leading tours to archaeological sites that are associated with ancient astronomy.

=== Bibliography ===
Krupp has written several books for adults and for children. His first two adult books (one being his doctoral dissertation), both derive from the work he did on rich clusters of galaxies while a PhD student at UCLA. His remaining adult books derive from his interests in archaeoastronomy, and contain extensive original research and analysis, while also being educational in nature. They cover astronomy in ancient cultures and the effect of beliefs about the sky on those cultures.

==== Books for adults ====
Books authored, partially authored, and/or edited by Krupp for an adult audience:

Title	Author(s)	Year Published	Publisher	Description	References
The Morphology of Rich Clusters of Galaxies	Edwin C. Krupp	1972	University Microfilms International, Ann Arbor, Michigan	Doctoral Dissertation (UCLA)	
The Luminosity Function of E-S0 Galaxies in Rich Clusters	Edwin C. Krupp	1974	University of California, Los Angeles		
In Search of Ancient Astronomies	Edwin C. Krupp (editor, principal author)	1978	Doubleday, Garden City, New York	Survey of the new scientific discipline of archaeoastronomy, the study of the astronomies of ancient and prehistoric times through archaeology.	
Echoes of the Ancient Skies: The Astronomy of Ancient Civilizations (Note: Selected for Book of the Month Club/Science. Also selected for two Macmillan book clubs (as the main and alternate selections).)	Edwin C. Krupp	1983	Harper & Row, New York	The study of ancient peoples' observations of the skies and the impact of those observations on their cultural evolution	
Archaeoastronomy and the Roots of Science	Edwin C. Krupp (Editor, Author)	1984	Westview Press, Boulder, Colorado	Reviews recent research, on the astronomy of worldwide ancient cultures and the effects of astronomy on those cultures.	
Beyond the Blue Horizon – Myths and Legends of the Sun, Moon, Stars, and Planets	Edwin C. Krupp	1991	HarperCollins, New York	A worldwide comparative study of celestial mythology, Skywatchers, Shamans, & Kings: Astronomy and the Archaeology of Power	
Skywatchers, Shamans, & Kings: Astronomy and the Archaeology of Power	Edwin C. Krupp	1996	John Wiley, New York	Journey to the world's essential sacred places and celestial shrines and see where the rulers of old communed with the gods of the sky.	
Public Astronomy, Los Angeles Style	David DeVorkin, Edwin C. Krupp (Editors)	2021	Griffith Observatory, Los Angeles	Griffith Observatory is the most visible agent of public astronomy in Los Angeles, but it wasn’t the first. Six experts detail this uniquely southern California story from street-corner telescopes to a street-legal Zeiss refractor mounted on the roof of a 1932 Ford.	

==== Chapters, forewords, and research papers ====
Krupp has also written full chapters for books edited by other authors, as well as research papers, included in publications of the proceedings of conferences where the papers were presented. Here are some examples

- Time and astronomy at the meeting of two worlds : proceedings of the International Symposium held in April 27 – May, 1992 in Frombork, Poland edited by Stanislaw Iwaniszewski
  - California Girls: Pleiades Traditions in Native California
- Handbook of Archaeoastronomy and Ethnoastronomy edited by Clive Ruggles, Krupp wrote three chapters for this book:
  - In Part I, Themes and Issues
    - Chapter 5, Astronomy and power
    - Chapter 18, Archaeoastronomy concepts in popular culture
  - In Part III, Pre-Columbian and indigenous North America
    - Chapter 41, Rock Art of the greater southwest
- Cosmology, Calendars, and Horizon-based Astronomy in Ancient Mesoamerica, edited by Anne S. Doud
  Susan Milbrath
  - Krupp wrote the Foreword for this book,
    - Astronomy, Anthropology, and Anthony Aveni
- Krupp has contributed to two books on the work of artist of James Turrell,
  - Mapping Spaces : a topological survey of the work by James Turrell
    - Authors: Craig Adcock, E C Krupp, Mario Diacono, James Turrell
  - James Turrell: A Retrospective
    - Authors: Michael Govan, James Turrell, Florian Holzherr, Christine Kim, Carol S Eliel, Alison Lima Greene, E C Krupp, Vivian Sobchack

==== Books for children ====
Children themed books, with illustrations by Robin Rector Krupp:

Title	Year Published	Publisher	Description	References
The Comet and You	1985	Macmillan Publishing Company, New York; Collier Macmillan, London	History, appearance, and physical composition of Halley's Comet, compares it to other comets, describes its path through the Solar System, and its predicted return	
The Big Dipper and You	1989	Morrow Junior Books New York	What is known today and past beliefs about the Big Dipper, or Ursa Major. Added information on the North Star, or Polaris.	
The Moon and You	1993	Simon & Schuster Books for Young Readers, New York; Macmillan Publishing Company, New York; Maxwell Macmillan Canada, Toronto; Maxwell Macmillan International, New York	Information about the Moon, describing its phases, rotation, effect on our tides, and myths and legends.	
The Rainbow and You	2000	HarperCollins, New York; Morrow Junior Books, New York	How rainbows are formed by the colors in sunlight shining through raindrops.	

=== Magazine/journal articles ===
Krupp was once a contributing editor to Sky & Telescope magazine and had a monthly column in that publication. The column was named Rambling Through the Skies and discussed the impact of astronomy on culture. He has also served as the editor of the Griffith Observer, the monthly magazine published by Griffith Observatory's.

Krupp has written many articles on astronomy and culture for the general reader and dozens of research papers. This list is a mere sampling:

Title	Magazine/Journal	Date/Volume	Page	Description	References
Whiter Shade of Pale	Sky & Telescope	July 2000	86	A rock that looks like the Milky Way and was used in ceremonies by Native Americans in California.	
Inner Glow	Sky & Telescope	December 2004	50	About the underground shrine at Newgrange, Ireland.	
The Great 2012 Scare	Sky & Telescope	November 2009	22–26	The Maya Calendar does not predict the end of the world in December 2012.	
Archaeoastronomy Unplugged: Eliminating the Fuzz Tone from Rock Art Astronomy	American Indian Rock Art	2006; Volume 21, Vol. 3	353–370		
Hiawatha in California	Astronomy Quarterly	1991; Vol. 8, No. 1	47–64		
Night Gallery: the Function, Origin, and Evolution of Constellations	Archaeoastronomy	2000	43–63		
Egyptian Astronomy: The Roots of Modern Timekeeping	New Scientist	January 3, 1980	24–27		
Saluting the Solstice	News from Native California	November 1987; Vol. 1(5)	10–13		
When Things are Divided in Half	Rock Art Papers San Diego Museum Papers	1990; No. 26, Vol. 7	41–48		

=== Films ===
Krupp has appeared in several documentary films and educational film series. He also has writing credits and scientific advisor credits. These include:

Title	Type	Year	Ed's Role	Description	References
Project Universe (Note: Project Universe was nominated for a local Emmy Award.)	PBS Telecourse Series (30 half-hour episodes)	1978	Presenter/Writer	Introduction to Astronomy	
Time Travel: Fact, Fiction and Fantasy	Documentary/Science Fiction	1985	Cast – Himself		
Seasons	Short Documentary	1987	Scientific Consultant		
Secrets and Mysteries (episode) Stonehenge	Documentary Series	1988	Cast – Himself	A look at England's Stonehenge, compared to American sites such as Arizona's Casa Grande and Mystery Hill in New Hampshire.	
The Complete Cosmos	Short Documentary/Science Fiction Series	1998–1999	Thanks to Ed Krupp and Griffith Observatory	Guide to the wonders of the universe.	
Horizon (episode) Atlantis Reborn	Documentary Series	1999	Cast – Himself		
Solarmax	Short Documentary	2000	Scientific Advisory Committee	The story of humankind's struggle to understand the sun.	
The Universe (episode) Constellations (2008) (episode) Stonehenge (2014) (episode) Pyramids (2014)	Documentary Series	2007–2015	Cast – Himself	Explores many scientific questions and topics about the universe	
Extreme Universe (episode) Star Gates	Documentary Series	2010	Cast – Himself		
Why We Will Still Be Here on Dec. 21 [2012]	Panel Discussion	2012	Panel Member	Sponsored and filmed by SETI, Why the Mayan calendar does not predict the end of the world.	

=== Planetarium programs ===
Krupp started his career at Griffith Observatory as a planetarium lecturer. As directory of the observatory he has returned to the Samuel Oschin Planetarium at Griffith Observatory as a writer. He has several planetarium show writing credits.

Title	Writer(s)	Description	References
Centered in the Universe	Don Dixon, E.C. Krupp, Andre Bormanis	Asks fundamental questions about Earth's and humankind's place in the universe.	
Time's Up	Laura Danly, Ed Krupp, Don Dixon, Chris Shelton	How time and the universe works and why the Mayan calendar did not predict the end of the world in 2012.	
Light of the Valkyries (Note: IMDb classifies Light of the Valkyries as an Animation Short. It is in fact, a planetarium show in the Samuel Oschin Planetarium at Griffith Observatory.)	Laura Danly, Don Dixon, Ed Krupp	A voyage of Viking cosmology that explores the true nature of the aurora borealis, the northern lights.	
First Light: The Telescope Changed Everything	Ed Krupp	How the world changed after Galileo Galilei built the world's finest telescope and pointed it to the sky.	

=== Professional affiliations ===
Krupp is affiliated with several scientific, astronomical, archaeoastronomical, and educational organizations.

- American Astronomical Society, and its Historical Astronomy Division
  - Historical Astronomy Division Vice-Chairman 1983–1985, Chairman 1985–1987
- International Astronomical Union
  - Member of
    - Division C Education, Outreach and Heritage
    - Commission C3 History of Astronomy
    - Inter-Commission C3-C4 WG Archaeoastronomy and Astronomy in Culture
  - Past Member of
    - Division XII Union-Wide Activities (until 2012)
    - Commission 41 History of Astronomy (until 2015)
    - Commission 46 Astronomy Education & Development (until 2015)
    - Commission 41 WG Archaeoastronomy and Astronomy in Culture (2015–2015)
    - Commission 41 WG Astronomy and World Heritage (until 2015)
- Committee for Skeptical Inquiry
  - Fellow
  - Member of Council for Media Integrity

=== Awards and honors ===
Krupp's writings, and active evangelization of the universe to the public, has resulted in his receiving several awards and honors:

Award/Honor	When	Awarded By	Description	Work Honored	References
Science-Writing Award	1978	American Institute of Physics (AIP)		In Search of Ancient Astronomies	
Science-Writing Award	1985	American Institute of Physics (AIP)		The Comet and You (Note: The first time the Science-Writing award was given for a book written for children.)	
Klumpke-Roberts Award	1989	Astronomical Society of the Pacific	For contributing to the understanding and appreciation of astronomy by the public.		
Honorary Doctor of Science	1996	West Coast University			
Clifford W. Holmes Award	2002	Riverside Telescope Makers Conference (Riverside, California)	For major contributions toward popularizing astronomy.		
Honorary Doctor of Science	2011	Pomona College			
Andrew Gemant Award (Note: Named for Andrew Gemant, a twentieth century physicist who specialized in the fields of viscoelasticity and fractional differentials.)	November 22, 2013	American Institute of Physics (AIP)	Awarded to a person that has made substantial cultural, artistic, or humanistic contributions to physics.		
Blaisdell Distinguished Alumni Award (Note: Recognizes alumni who have borne the essence of Pomona College into the world, and have emulated to the James A. Blaisdell quotation carved on the college gates: "They only are loyal to the college who departing bear their added riches in trust for mankind.")	April 29, 2016	Pomona College	Honors alumni for achievement in professional and community service		

On November 22, 2013 Krupp was presented with the Andrew Gemant Award at a session of the Los Angeles city council, the award citation indicated that Krupp was being recognized for:

- 40 years of outreach and education through extraordinary planetarium shows and programs.
- Award-winning and popular articles, books, exhibits, lectures, public events and television programs.
- Distinguished archaeoastronomical research in which the links between astronomy and ancient culture have been explored.

At the ceremony Catherine O'Riordan, then AIP vice president of Physics Resources said:

Griffith Observatory, where Edwin Krupp has been director for nearly four decades, is the most-visited public observatory in the world. Through telescopes, other public instruments, innovative exhibits, and live astronomical programs, he has brought the heavens to life for millions on the ground.

== Personal life ==
Krupp married Robin Rector on New Year's Eve of 1968. They had one son and divorced in 2006. Krupp now resides in the Eagle Rock neighborhood of Los Angeles, California.
