= Abell 68 =

Galaxy cluster in the constellation Pisces

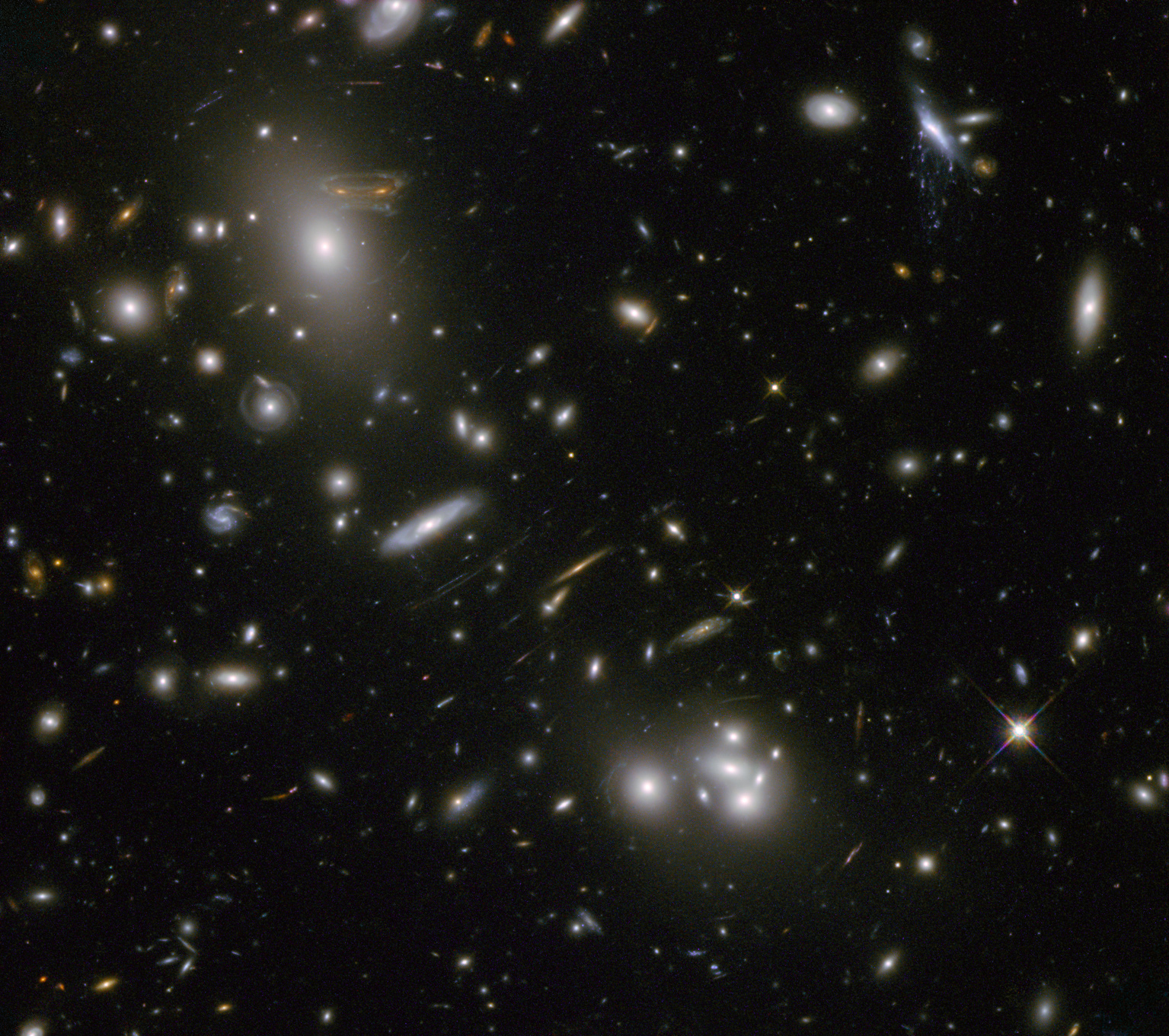
- The galaxy cluster, Abell 68 captured by the Hubble Space Telescope in 2012

Observation data (Epoch J2000.0)
- Constellation: Pisces
- Right ascension: 00h 37m 05.300s
- Declination: +09d 09m 11.00s
- Brightest member: Abell 68 BCG (PGC 1360619)
- Richness class: 1
- Bautz–Morgan classification: Type I
- Redshift: 0.254600
- Distance: 3.668 Gly (1124.6 Mpc)
- X-ray luminosity: Between 6 × 1042 and 11 × 1044 erg s^{−1}

Other designations
- NSCS J003706+090916, ZwCl 0034.4+0851, PSZ2 G116.95-53.55

Abell 68 is massive and rich galaxy cluster located in the constellation of Pisces with a projected co-moving distance of approximately 1124.6 Mpc or 3.668 billion light-years away from Earth. The cluster is especially notable for its gravitational lensing and was first discovered by George O. Abell in 1958.

== History ==
Abell 68 is one of the original 2,712 galaxy clusters to be compiled inside the Abell Catalogue by George O. Abell who used the data that is retrieved from the National Geographic Society - Palomar Observatory Sky Survey.

== Characteristics ==
Abell 68 has a temperature in the middle of 1-10 keV and a luminosity range of 6 × 10^{42} to 11 × 10^{44} erg s^{−1}. Dynamically relaxed but shows evidence of disturbed structures suggest the merger of a cluster. The galaxy cluster also has a massive size with an estimation of M_{500} ≳ 2 × 10^{14} M⊙. Several galaxies of Abell 68 are known to infall into the cluster as they pass through intergalactic gas. As they do so, the ram pressure takes place to strip the gas from galaxies with gas clouds heated in the process. Throughout the process, these galaxies classified as jellyfish galaxies, suffer the extinguishment of their star formations when AGN of the BCG in the cluster is switched on.

Abell 68 is an accreting cluster with a clustercentric radius measuring r_{sp}/r_{200,m} = 1.291 ± 0.062 presenting a splashback feature with a gas entropy showing the total feedback energy per particle declining from ~10 keV to zero at ~0.35r_{200} implying there is an upper limit of the feedback efficiency of ~0.02 for the supermassive black hole located in central region of the cluster's BCG.

According to researchers, Abell 68 has several dwarf galaxies members. Through investigating their luminosity function of (M_{i} < -15), they found these galaxies located towards the end of the cluster exhibits a flat slope (α ~ -1.2 to -1.4) but at steeper profiles when being away from the cluster.

== Gravitational lensed galaxies ==
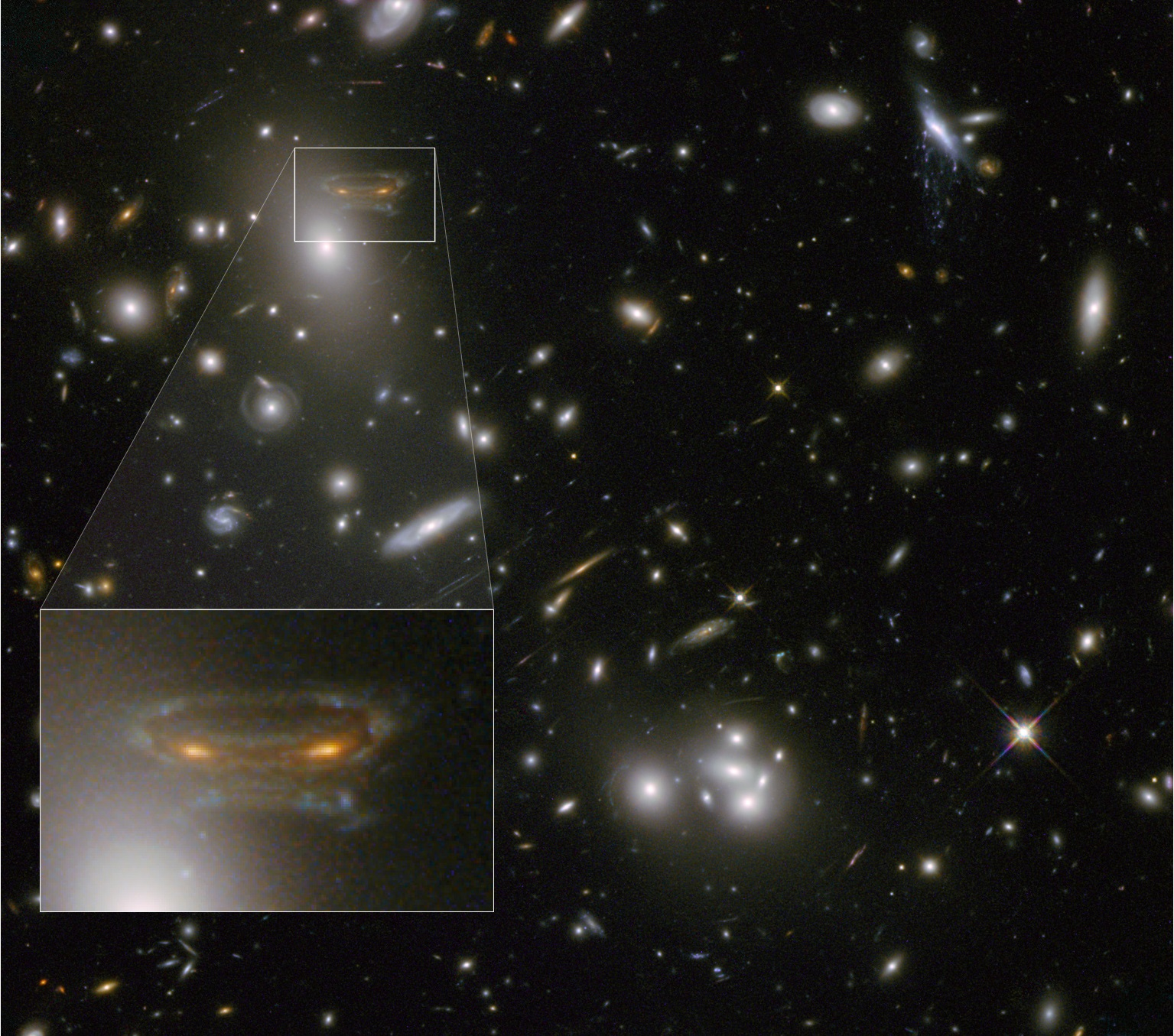
Gravitational lensing has caused the background galaxy to be split and stretched, hence giving this appearance.

Abell 68 has a strong gravitational lens. It was able to detect objects at a much further distance with the lens. According to observations by Hubble Space Telescope, the gravitational lens was able to capture a background galaxy, called ERO J003707. Located at redshift 1.6, the lens somehow twisted the galaxy into a form of a 1970s video game alien from Space Invaders. Furthermore ERO J003707, is an L* early-type disk galaxy with similar properties (R-K)>=5.3 and K<=21 shared by ~10 percent of galaxies. Looking at its evolution stage, researchers theorized; the cooling of the gas presented by hierarchical galaxy formation models could develop EROJ003707 into a luminous spiral galaxy.

Researchers who presented Spitzer and IRAC surveys of H-faint (H 160 ≳ 26.4, < 5σ) sources in 101 lensing cluster fields, found more distant background galaxies. They are impressively large with median star populations M _{star} = 10^{10.3±0.3} M⊙, produced with star formation rates of = 100^{+60}_{−40} M ⊙ yr^{−1}. Not only to mention, they are obscured by dust that measures A _{V} = 2.6 ± 0.3 and located at various redshifts of 3.9 ± 0.4. According to these researchers, they are confirmed to be H-faint galaxies making up at least 16^{+13}_{−7}% of the galaxies but with a stellar-mass range of 10^{10} - 10^{11.2} M ⊙ at z = 3 ~ 5. This gives rise to 8^{+8}_{−4}% of the cosmic star formation rate density in the epoch showing the early phases of how massive galaxies were formed.

== Abell 68 BCG ==
Abell 68 Brightest Cluster Galaxy
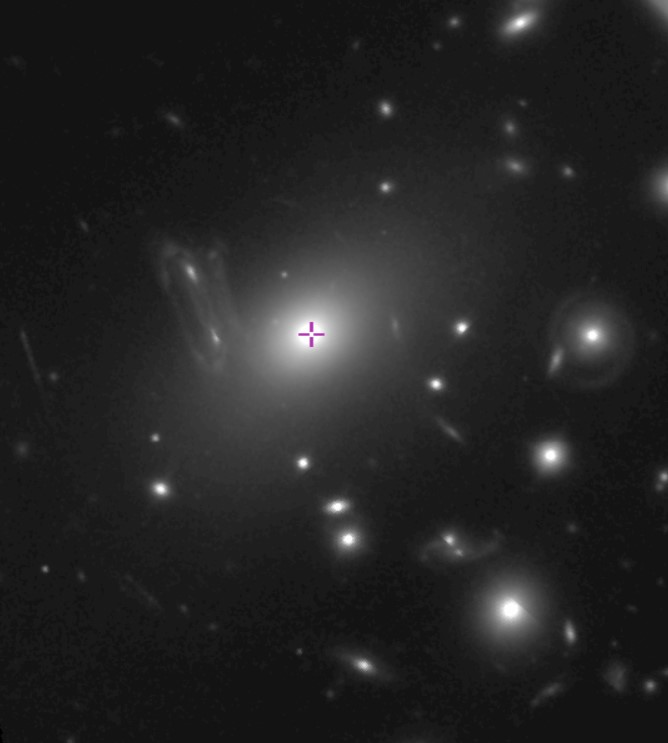
- Black and white Hubble image of Abell 68 BCG

Observation data (J2000.0 epoch)
- Constellation: Pisces
- Right ascension: 00h 37m 06.86s
- Declination: +09d 09m 23.6s
- Redshift: 0.249403
- Heliocentric radial velocity: 74,769 km/s
- Distance: 3.651 Gly (1119.4 Mpc)
- Group or cluster: Abell 68
- Apparent magnitude (V): 0.257
- Apparent magnitude (B): 0.340
- Surface brightness: 26.5

Characteristics
- Type: BrCLG

Other designations
- 2MASX J00370686+0909236, PGC 1360619, SDSS J003706.84+090924.1, WISEA J003706.85+090924.0

The brightest cluster galaxy of Abell 68 or Abell 68 BCG (short for Abell 68 Brightest Cluster Galaxy), also known as PGC 1360619, is a type-cD elliptical galaxy. It occupies as dominant member of the cluster. It is located in the constellation of Pisces with a redshift of 0.24.

Abell 68 BCG has a light profile. This surface brightness law, μ(r) ə r^{1/4}, described by de Vaucouleurs, has a large range in its radius and fitted to the inner regions. It is an emission line galaxy with a strong radio source and a powerful core component, in relationship with [O III] 5007 Å line emission when detected through multifrequency radio observations from Australia Telescope Compact Array, Jansky Very Large Array and Very Long Baseline Array telescopes. Moreover, Abell 68 BCG is also a low-excitation radio galaxy. It has a 1.4 GHz luminosity betwixt 2 × 10^{23} and 3 × 10^{25} W Hz^{−1} caused by cooling gas accretion from the hot atmosphere, triggering the active galactic nucleus (AGN). The galaxy is known to have a near-infrared luminosity range of L_{X} > 5 × 10^{44} erg s^{−1}.

The galaxy is known to have a inactive appearance with a big velocity dispersion of σ > 160 km s^{−1} and much steeper as expected, when researchers created a velocity dispersion function of D_{n}4000 > 1.5 within R_{200}. Presumably, Abell 68 BCG was formed from galaxy mergers caused by interacting smaller elliptical galaxies or spirals. When collided together, process of dynamical friction is combined with mutual tidal forces. As kinetic energy is re-allotted into random energy, these galaxies are then coalesced into an unshaped, triaxial system that becomes an elliptical galaxy like Abell 68 BCG.
