= Abell Catalog of Planetary Nebulae =

Astronomical catalog

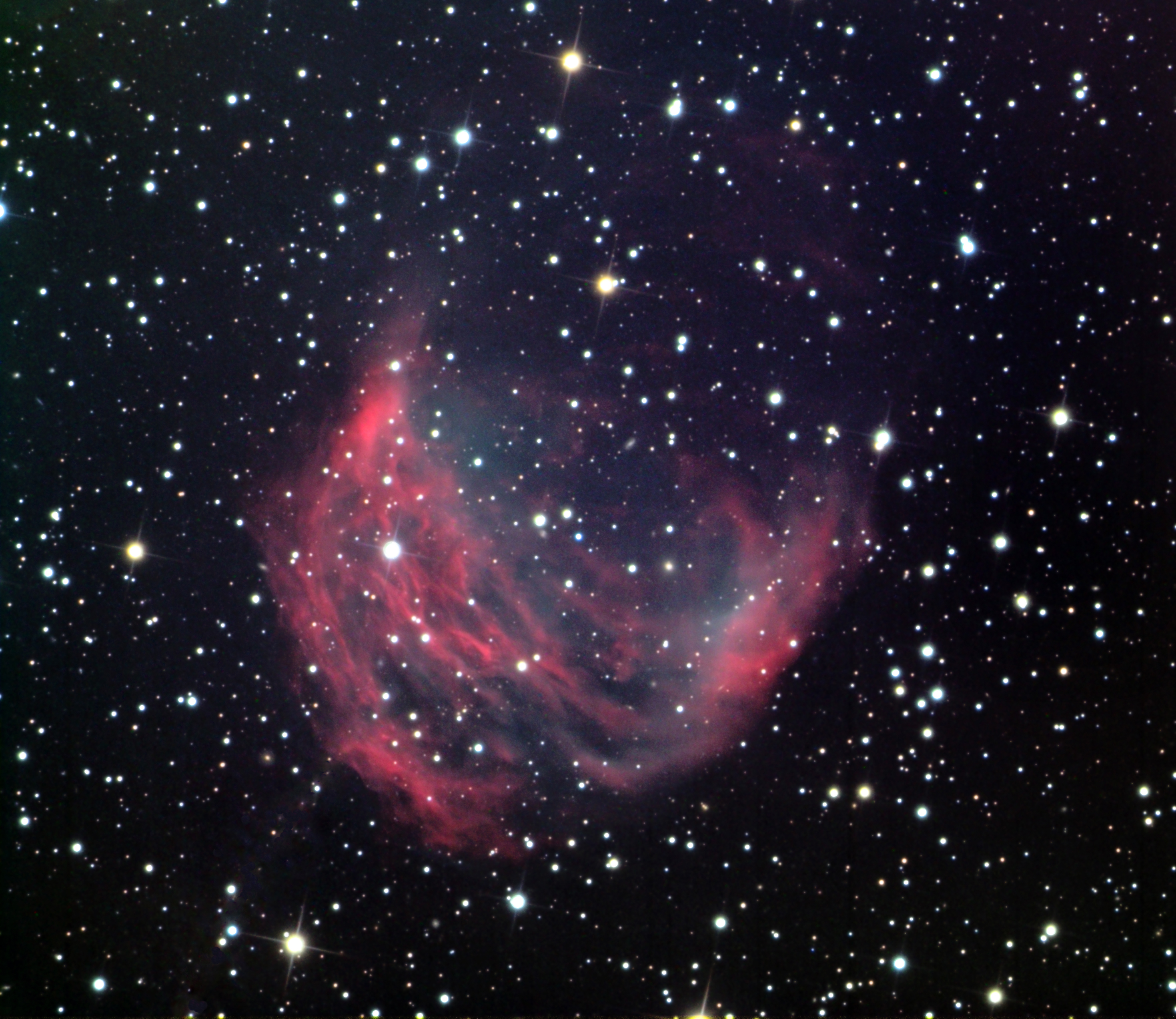
Medusa Nebula (Abell 21)

The Abell Catalog of Planetary Nebulae is an astronomical catalogue created in 1966 by George O. Abell and was composed of 86 entries thought to be planetary nebulae.

The objects were collected from discoveries, about half by Albert George Wilson and the rest by Abell, Robert George Harrington, and Rudolph Minkowski. All were discovered before August 1955 as part of the National Geographic Society – Palomar Observatory Sky Survey on photographic plates created with the 48-inch (1.2 m) Samuel Oschin telescope at Mount Palomar. Four are better known from previous catalogs: Abell 50 is NGC 6742, Abell 75 is NGC 7076, Abell 37 is IC 972, and Abell 81 is IC 1454. Another four were later rejected as not being planetaries: Abell 11 (reflection nebula), Abell 32 (red plate flaw), Abell 76 (ring galaxy PGC 85185), and Abell 85 (supernova remnant CTB 1 and noted as possibly such in Abell's 1966 paper). Another three were also not included in the Strasbourg-ESO Catalogue of Galactic Planetary Nebulae (SEC): Abell 9, Abell 17 (red plate flaw), and Abell 64.

Planetaries on the list are best viewed with a large aperture telescope (e.g. 18-inch (0.46 m)) and an OIII filter.
