= Andrew Gemant Award =

Annual Physics Award

The Andrew Gemant Award is a prize awarded by the American Institute of Physics to a person who has made substantial cultural, artistic, or humanistic contributions to physics. The award is named after Andrew Gemant, a pioneer in materials science, and made possible by his bequest.

== Award winners ==
Award winners
Year	Name
1987	Philip Morrison
1988	Freeman Dyson
1989	Gerald Holton
1990	Jeremy Bernstein
1991	Cyril Stanley Smith
1992	Martin Aitken
1993	Abraham Pais
1994	Spencer Weart
1995	Robert R. Wilson
1996	Alan Lightman
1997	Steven Weinberg
1998	Stephen Hawking
1999	Paula Apsell
2000	James Trefil
2001	Lawrence Krauss
2002	Michael Riordan
2003	Brian Greene
2004	Alan J. Friedman
2005	Hans Christian von Baeyer
2006	Marcia Bartusiak
2007	Andrew Fraknoi
2008	John S. Rigden
2009	Brian Schwartz
2010	Daniel R. Altschuler
2011	Stephen P. Maran
2012	Lisa Randall
2013	Edwin C. Krupp
2014	Sean M. Carroll
2015	Ainissa Ramirez
2016	James Kakalios
2017	Don Lincoln
2018	David E. Kaplan
2019	Virginia Trimble
2020	Geraldine Cox
2021	Sylvester James Gates
2022	Clifford V. Johnson

== See also ==
- List of physics awards
