= 53P/Van Biesbroeck =

Periodic comet

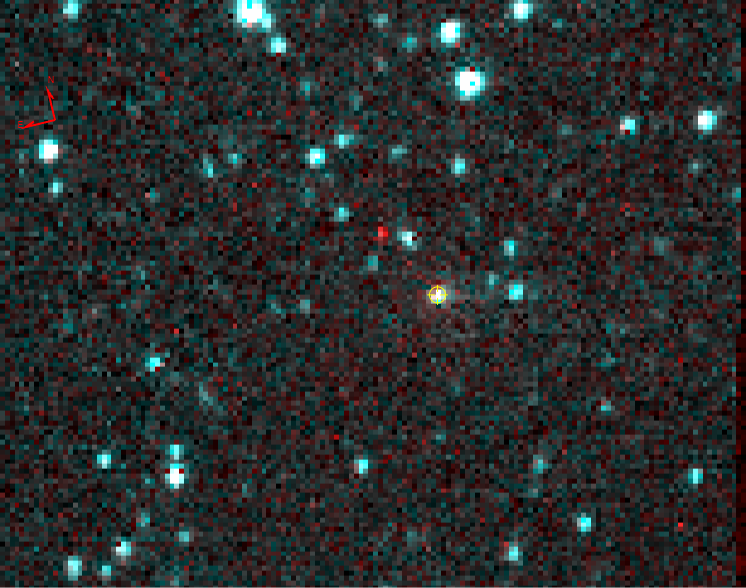
- Infrared image of 53P/Van Biesbroeck taken by NEOWISE on 26 April 2016

Discovery
- Discovered by: George Van Biesbroeck
- Discovery site: Yerkes Observatory
- Discovery date: 1 September 1954

Designations
- MPC designation: P/1954 R1, P/1965 J1; P/1989 H1
- Alternative designations: 1954 IV, 1966 III; 1978 XXIV, 1991 VI; 1954i, 1965d, 1977s

Orbital characteristics
- Epoch: 13 September 2023 (JD 2460200.5)
- Observation arc: 63.42 years
- Number of observations: 3,195
- Aphelion: 8.423 AU
- Perihelion: 2.445 AU
- Semi-major axis: 5.434 AU
- Eccentricity: 0.55009
- Orbital period: 12.67 years
- Inclination: 6.607°
- Longitude of ascending node: 148.83°
- Argument of periapsis: 134.47°
- Mean anomaly: 209.69°
- Last perihelion: 29 April 2016
- Next perihelion: 24 December 2028
- T_{Jupiter}: 2.652
- Earth MOID: 1.416 AU
- Jupiter MOID: 0.009 AU

Physical characteristics
- Mean radius: 3.33–3.37 km (2.07–2.09 mi)
- Spectral type: (V–R) = 0.336±0.075
- Comet total magnitude (M1): 10.0
- Comet nuclear magnitude (M2): 12.5

53P/Van Biesbroeck is a periodic comet about 7.0 km (4.3 mi) in diameter. Its current orbital period is 12.67 years.

== Observational history ==
The comet was discovered by George Van Biesbroeck of the Yerkes Observatory on 1 September 1954 while searching for the asteroid 1953 GC (now mainly known as 2696 Magion). The comet had an estimated apparent magnitude of 14.5 and appeared well condensed. The comet was then 1.85 AU (277 million km) from Earth and 2.86 AU (428 million km) from the Sun and had passed from its perigee, which took place on 17 August 1954. The comet was followed until 13 November 1955.

== Orbit ==
This comet and 42P/Neujmin are fragments of a parent comet that split around March 1845. The orbit of 53P/Van Biesbroeck has a Jupiter minimum orbit intersection distance (MOID) of only 0.009 AU (1.3 million km; 840,000 mi). The next perihelion passage is on Christmas Eve 24 December 2028. The comet is expected to brighten to about apparent magnitude 14.

== Physical characteristics ==
The nucleus of the comet has a radius of 3.33–3.37 km (2.07–2.09 mi) based on observations by the Keck Observatory.

Numbered comets
Previous; 52P/Harrington–Abell	53P/Van Biesbroeck	Next; 54P/de Vico–Swift–NEAT
