= 51P/Harrington =

Periodic comet with 7 year orbit

Discovery
- Discovered by: Robert G. Harrington at Palomar Observatory
- Discovery date: 14 August 1953

Orbital characteristics
- Epoch: 2022-09-18 (JD 2459840.5)
- Aphelion: 5.724 AU (Q)
- Perihelion: 1.6925 AU (q)
- Semi-major axis: 3.708 AU (a)
- Eccentricity: 0.5436
- Orbital period: 7.14 yr
- Inclination: 5.427°
- Last perihelion: 2022-Oct-01; 12 August 2015; 18 June 2008
- Next perihelion: 2029-Nov-16 (MPC)

51P/Harrington is a periodic comet in the Solar System.

It was discovered by Robert George Harrington at Palomar Observatory on 14 August 1953 using the Schmidt telescope. It then had a brightness of magnitude 15. In October 1956 its orbit was affected by the planet Jupiter and on its next return in 1960 the brightness had fallen to magnitude 20. By 1980 it had slightly improved to magnitude 18. It has a period of 7.1 years.

In 1987 and 1994 brightness had significantly increased to magnitude 12. In 1994 Jim Scotti at Kitt Peak Observatory observed that the comet had broken up and that two detached pieces were accompanying the main body, which explained the improvement in the brightness. By 2001 further splitting had occurred.

51P came to opposition on 25 August 2022 when it had a solar elongation of 168 degrees and was 0.73 AU from Earth. It came to perihelion (closest approach to the Sun) on 1 October 2022.

2022 Perihelion Passage
Fragment	Opposition	Perigee (Earth approach)	Perihelion (Sun approach)
51P-A	2022-08-23 @ 168.2°	2022-09-03 @ 0.727 au	2022-10-03 @ 1.69 au
51P-D	2022-08-25 @ 167.9°	2022-09-04 @ 0.720 au	2022-10-01 @ 1.69 au

== See also ==
- List of periodic comets

Numbered comets
Previous; 50P/Arend	51P/Harrington	Next; 52P/Harrington–Abell
