= 44P/Reinmuth =

Periodic comet

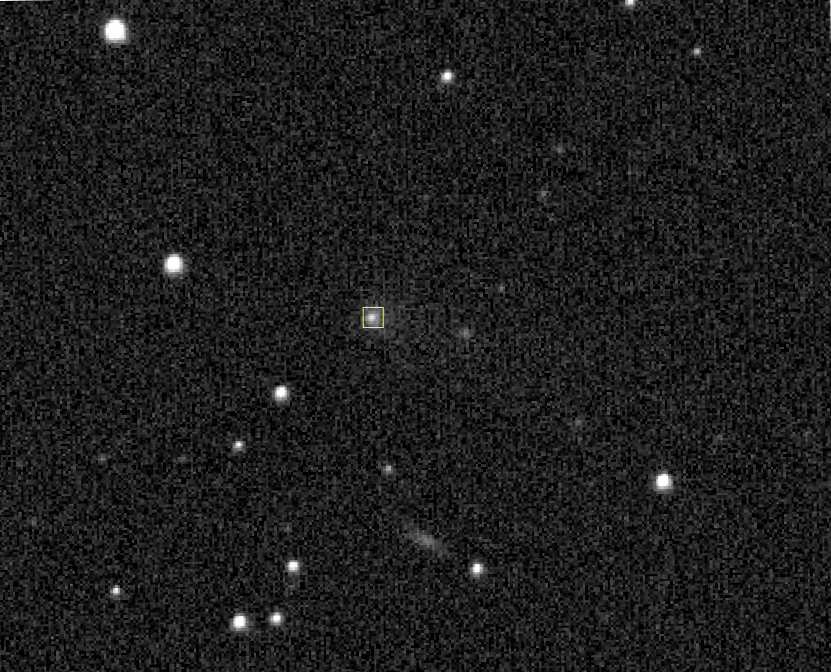
- Comet Reinmuth 2 photographed from the Zwicky Transient Facility on 15 November 2022

Discovery
- Discovered by: Karl Reinmuth
- Discovery date: 10 September 1947

Designations
- MPC designation: P/1947 R1, P/1953 N1
- Alternative designations: Reinmuth 2; 1947 VII, 1954 VI; 1960 IX, 1974 VI, 1981 III; 1987 XXVI, 1994 XVII

Orbital characteristics
- Epoch: 13 September 2023 (JD 2460200.5)
- Observation arc: 76.49 years
- Number of observations: 2,443
- Aphelion: 5.264 AU
- Perihelion: 2.112 AU
- Semi-major axis: 3.688 AU
- Eccentricity: 0.42726
- Orbital period: 7.082 years
- Inclination: 5.897°
- Longitude of ascending node: 286.43°
- Argument of periapsis: 58.024°
- Mean anomaly: 70.704°
- Last perihelion: 23 April 2022
- Next perihelion: 20 May 2029
- T_{Jupiter}: 2.925
- Earth MOID: 1.113 AU
- Jupiter MOID: 0.523 AU

Physical characteristics
- Mean radius: 1.62 km (1.01 mi)
- Mean density: 610±90 kg/m^{3}
- Spectral type: (V–R) = 0.62±0.08
- Comet total magnitude (M1): 14.0

44P/Reinmuth or Reinmuth 2 is a Jupiter-family comet that is greatly perturbed by the gas giant Jupiter. The diameter of this comet is estimated at 3.22 km (2.00 mi) and its absolute magnitude at 14.

== Discovery ==
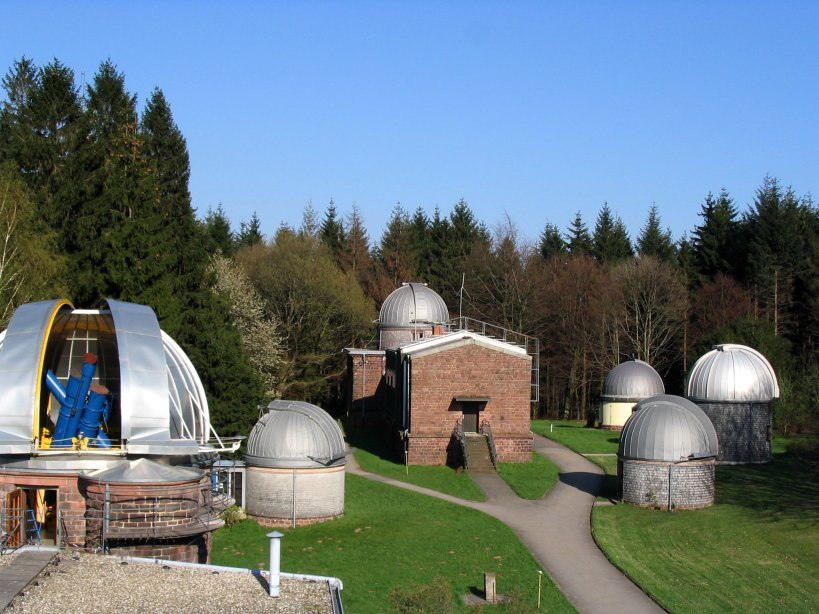
The LSW-Heidelberg where comet Reinmuth was discovered. The dome of the Bruce telescope is open

Reinmuth was discovered during a survey of small Solar System bodies with the 40 cm Bruce telescope at the LSW-Heidelberg Observatory in Heidelberg, Germany. The absolute magnitude of the comet was estimated by Karl Reinmuth to be 13, two orders of magnitude smaller than the current estimate.. This comet was found to be a periodic comet by Leland E. Cunningham in Berkeley, California, who calculated an elliptical orbit with a 7.12-year orbital period. He also predicted that it would come to perihelion again on 3 October 1947. Later, this was revised to 6.59 years and August 19, 1947. The comet ended up reaching perihelion nearly one month after the expected date, and the calculations of its orbit was then refined further until the values were correct.

== Relationship with Jupiter ==
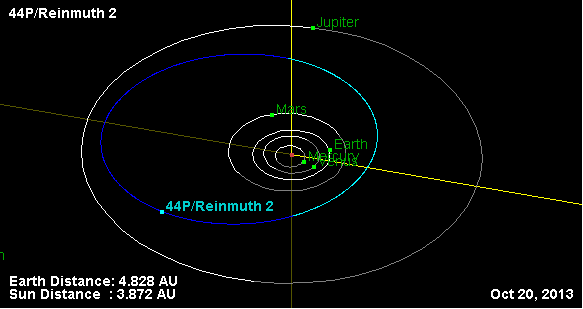
Orbit of 44P/Reinmuth. At aphelion, it gets very close to Jupiter, which alters its orbit.

Reinmuth 2 makes many close approaches to Jupiter. These close approaches gradually change its orbit. For example, on 16 July 2003, comet Reinmuth 2 came within 0.74 AU of Jupiter. This increased its perihelion from 1.89 to 2.11 AU and its orbital period from 6.63 to 7.07 years. On 11 February 2039, Reinmuth will come within 0.52 AU of Jupiter, which will raise its perihelion to 2.44 AU and its orbital period to 7.78 years. On 21 July 2063 and 1 March 2146, Reinmuth will come 0.43 AU and 0.51 AU, respectively. Close approaches like these could raise Reinmuth's perihelion until it ceases to become a comet.

Numbered comets
Previous; 43P/Wolf–Harrington	44P/Reinmuth	Next; 45P/Honda–Mrkos–Pajdušáková
