= Summer Science Program =

Academic summer program in the United States

Summer Science Program, Inc.
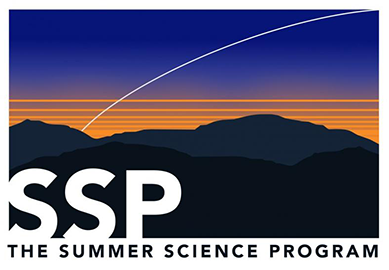
- Logo since 2015

- Founded: 1959
- Founder: Thacher School and Caltech
- Type: 501(c)(3) Educational Charity
- Tax ID no.: 94-3341965
- Purpose: Astronomy education
- Location(s): University of Colorado, Boulder, New Mexico State University, Purdue University, Indiana University Bloomington, and University of North Carolina at Chapel Hill
- Members: c. 2,000
- Employees: 1 year-round, about 15 for six weeks
- Volunteers: c. 50
- Website: http://www.summerscience.org/

The Summer Science Program (SSP) is an academic summer program where high school students experience college-level education and do research in celestial mechanics by studying the orbits of asteroids, biochemistry by studying the kinetic properties of enzymes, genomics by studying antibiotic resistance, or synthetic chemistry by studying macrocyclic catalysts. The program was established in 1959 at The Thacher School in Ojai, California. It now takes place on three astrophysics campuses, New Mexico State University in Las Cruces, New Mexico, the University of North Carolina at Chapel Hill in Chapel Hill, North Carolina, and University of Colorado, Boulder in Boulder, Colorado, and two biochemistry campuses, Purdue University in West Lafayette, Indiana and Indiana University Bloomington in Bloomington, Indiana.

In the Astrophysics program, each team takes a series of images of a near-earth asteroid, then writes software to calculate its orbit and predict its future path. In the Biochemistry program, each team isolates and models an enzyme from a fungal crop pathogen, then designs a molecule to inhibit that enzyme. In the Genomics program, each team grows a culture of Vibrio natriegens under moderate antibiotic selection pressure.

The program is co-sponsored by the Massachusetts Institute of Technology and the California Institute of Technology which are affiliate universities, and by Harvey Mudd College, which is an academic partner to the program.

== History ==
The program was established in 1959 at The Thacher School in Ojai, California, as a response to the launch of Sputnik 1 and the start of the Space Race. The Headmaster at Thacher was concerned that the country's top high school students were not being adequately informed and inspired about careers in the physical sciences. He decided to create an intense summer program to challenge such students and give them a taste of "doing real science," with assistance from Caltech, UCLA, Claremont Colleges, and Stanford. Financial support came from Hughes Aircraft.

The first SSP was led by Dr. Paul Routly and Dr. Foster Strong. In 1960, Dr. George Abell joined the program for his first of more than 20 summers at SSP.

The first year, SSP had 26 students. The students used data from the "Russian ephemeris" (Ephemyeredi Mahlikh Planyet) to find asteroids to photograph, measured the positions, and submitted the data to the Minor Planet Center at the Center for Astrophysics | Harvard & Smithsonian. The students were excited to find that when they calculated the orbit of 9 Metis, their data resulted in a significant correction to the Russian ephemeris.

Women were admitted starting in 1969, and reached 50% of enrollment in 2010.

After 41 summers at Thacher, a significant threat to the continuation of SSP came in 2000, when Thacher School decided to use its entire campus for a different purpose. SSP alumni incorporated Summer Science Program, Inc., solicited funding largely from the alumni community, and found a new host campus. Beginning in 2000, SSP was held at the Happy Valley School, located just across the Ojai Valley from The Thacher School. In 2007, Happy Valley School was renamed Besant Hill School.

With the alumni rescue complete, they soon began looking to expand the program. In 2003 a second campus opened at New Mexico Tech in Socorro with the support of New Mexico Tech, Los Alamos and Sandia national laboratories, and others. In 2010, the California campus moved to Westmont College in Santa Barbara, then in 2015 to University of Colorado Boulder. In 2016, following three years of planning and preparation, a pilot of the first SSP in Biochemistry was held at Purdue University in West Lafayette, Indiana. Six alumni from the previous summer successfully ran through the new experiment. In 2017, the first SSP in Biochemistry was successfully held with 24 participants. In 2022, the first SSP in Genomics took place at Purdue University with 24 participants.

Through 2017, over 2,500 participants have attended 75 programs. All alumni and former faculty are "members" of the nonprofit for life, along with other members named by the Board. The Members elect Trustees annually, have access to an online database for networking, and are invited to an Annual Dinner held each fall.

In 2022, 1969 alum and co-founder of Qualcomm, Franklin Antonio, donated $200 million to SSP in his will after his death.

== Astronomical work ==
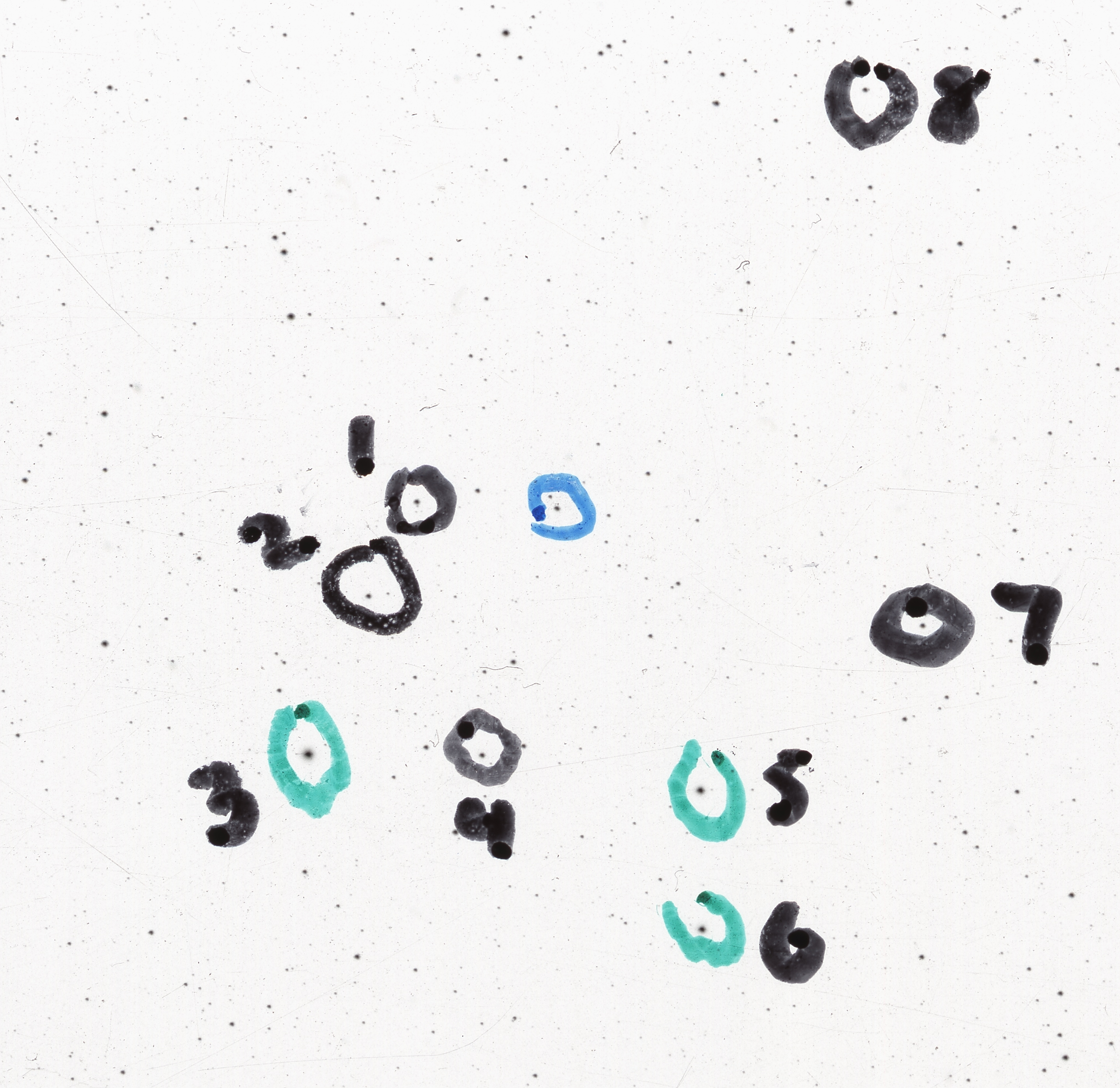
Example of an astrographic plate taken at SSP, in this case showing 39 Laetitia (circled in blue). Reference stars are also circled.

For the first 50 years of the program, students took photographic images of main-belt asteroids (between the orbits of Mars and Jupiter). Starting in 2009 students took digital images of (much fainter) near-Earth asteroids (inside the orbit of Mars). The process of orbit determination is conceptually the same in both cases. First students take a series of images of asteroids. After identifying the asteroid, its position on the image relative to known stars is carefully calculated. That relative position is then used to determine the position of the asteroid in celestial coordinates (right ascension and declination) at the exact time the image was taken. The series of positions as the asteroid moves across the sky allows the student to fit an approximate orbit to the asteroid. The measured asteroid coordinates (not the calculated orbital elements) are submitted to the Center for Astrophysics | Harvard & Smithsonian.

Over the decades SSP students have done their orbit determination calculations on mechanical calculators (1960s), then electronic calculators (1970s), then "mini-computers" (1980s), then personal computers (1990s and 2000s). In recent years they write their orbit determination programs in the Python programming language, employing the Gaussian method.

== List of alumni ==
The following is a list of notable alumni.

- Jerold Krieger, 1960 (1943–2002) - Los Angeles County Superior Court judge
- Jerry Nelson, 1960 (1944-2017) - astronomer, the pioneer in the design of segmented mirror telescopes; project scientist for the W. M. Keck Observatory
- Ed Krupp, 1961 - astronomer, author, Director of Griffith Observatory in Los Angeles
- Ronald Kaplan, 1962 - computational linguist, Chief Scientist for Amazon Search
- Robert Tarjan, 1964 - Professor of Computer Science at Princeton University
- Mitch Kapor, 1966 - founder of Lotus Development Corporation, designer of Lotus 1-2-3 and Lotus Notes
- Franklin Antonio, 1969 - co-founder of Qualcomm
- Robert D. Arnott, 1970 - pioneer in "smart beta" investing, chairman and CEO of Research Affiliates
- N. Gregory Mankiw, 1975 - Professor of Economics at Harvard University; chairman of the Council of Economic Advisers, 2003 to 2005
- Scott Pace, 1975 - Executive Director of the National Space Council at the White House
- Edmund Bertschinger, 1975 - Professor of theoretical physics, Massachusetts Institute of Technology
- R. Paul Butler, 1977 - astronomer, staff scientist at the Carnegie Institution for Science
- Elizabeth H. Simmons, 1980 - physicist, Executive Vice Chancellor for Academic Affairs at UC San Diego
