= 42P/Neujmin =

Periodic comet with 10 year orbit

Discovery
- Discovered by: Grigory Neujmin
- Discovery date: August 2, 1929

Designations
- Alternative designations: 1929 III; 1; 1993 XVI

Orbital characteristics
- Epoch: March 6, 2006
- Aphelion: 7.701 AU
- Perihelion: 2.014 AU
- Semi-major axis: 4.858 AU
- Eccentricity: 0.5854
- Orbital period: 10.71 a
- Inclination: 3.9854°
- Last perihelion: January 14, 2026; April 8, 2015; July 15, 2004
- Next perihelion: October 13, 2036

42P/Neujmin, also known as Neujmin 3, is a periodic comet 2 km in diameter. It will next came to perihelion on 14 January 2026 at around magnitude 19.

This comet and 53P/Van Biesbroeck are fragments of a parent comet that split in March 1845.

The comet did not come within 1 AU of a planet in the 20th century, but will pass 0.04 AU from asteroid 4 Vesta on July 17, 2036.

The comet nucleus is estimated to be 2.2 kilometers in diameter.

Numbered comets
Previous; 41P/Tuttle–Giacobini–Kresák	42P/Neujmin	Next; 43P/Wolf–Harrington
