= Jerold Krieger =

American judge

Judge of the Los Angeles County Superior Court
- In office 1988–2002
- Succeeded by: Tammy Chung Ryu

Judge of the Los Angeles Municipal Court
- In office 1983–1988
- Appointed by: Jerry Brown

Personal details
- Born: December 12, 1943 Los Angeles, California, U.S.
- Died: February 14, 2002 (aged 58) Los Angeles, California, U.S.
- Education: University of California, Riverside; University of California, Los Angeles School of Law

Jerold A. Krieger (December 12, 1943 – February 14, 2002) was a judge of the Los Angeles County Superior Court known for his work fighting for civil rights for gays, minorities and the disadvantaged. As an openly gay judge, he served as Chairperson of the Sexual Orientation Fairness Subcommittee of the California Judicial Council's Access and Fairness Advisory Committee. He was a co-founder of the world's first gay and lesbian synagogue. He served on the 2nd District Court of Appeal by special temporary appointment, and he hoped for a permanent post on that court.

== Early life and education ==
Krieger was born in Los Angeles, California, the son of an ophthalmologist. After studying astronomy at the Summer Science Program as a high school student in 1960, he graduated from the University of California, Riverside with a bachelor's degree in political science and then from the University of California, Los Angeles School of Law in 1968.

== Professional career and judicial service ==
As a California Deputy Attorney General, he was elected in 1974 to be president of the Association of Deputy Attorneys General. In private practice starting in 1977, he handled civil cases. Krieger was the chairman and treasurer for 1980 reelection campaign of Mike Roos for California State Assembly. Roos recommended Krieger as a judicial appointee.

California Governor Jerry Brown named Krieger to the Los Angeles Municipal Court on December 31, 1982. It was Brown's last day before leaving office at the end of his second term. Krieger was the fifth and final openly gay judge appointed by Brown in his second term as governor, after having appointed none in his first term. Krieger noted that "The importance of my appointment was in the fact that it did not make headlines." Krieger joined the Municipal Court in 1983 and served until 1988, becoming the presiding judge of its Encino branch.

In 1988, Krieger successfully ran for an open seat on the Los Angeles County Superior Court, winning by a large margin. He was unopposed for reelection in 1994 and 2000 and served on the Superior Court bench until his death from cancer on February 14, 2002.

Krieger said that "the first time I imposed the death sentence" was one of his most memorable cases on the bench. On the other hand, "civil trials are easy. Heck, it's only about money."

He regularly received praise from lawyers for his legal knowledge and fair decisions. He kept jurors involved and interested through long trials.

== Equal rights ==
Krieger served as a role model on the bench for many openly gay judges who followed him.

He was a member of the California Judicial Council's Access and Fairness Advisory Committee and was chairperson of its Sexual Orientation Fairness Subcommittee.

The subcommittee conducted a six-year study, which was the first of its kind in the nation. It found many situations where people in the courts system, including parties to cases, workers, and jurors, were subject to bias. Krieger stated, "The study shows that there is both a perception and in some cases actual unequal treatment based upon sexual orientation."

"It's a wake-up call of how much work needs to be done," said Jon W. Davidson, attorney for the Lambda Legal Defense and Education Fund. "It has important consequences, because gays and lesbians are going to use the court system. The courts need to deal with [the inequalities] if they're committed to open access for all people."

Commenting on the study, Krieger said it is the laws that are prejudiced, not the judges and court employees. "I can be very fair," he said. "But I'm still not permitted to do a marriage of a gay couple."

Krieger's subcommittee made many recommendations for "ensuring that the court system is fair and accessible to all persons in the state of California" in regards to sexual orientation. These included improving training, developing a diverse pool of clerks and interns, changing the Standards of Judicial Administration to prevent retaliation against whistleblowers, and studying bias in hiring and promotion.

Krieger also was a co-founder in 1972 of the world's first gay and lesbian synagogue, Temple Beth Chayim Chadashim. "In the gay community, you don't feel you can be Jewish, and in the Jewish community, you don't feel you can be gay. I'm still a Jew, and I'm also gay. The temple brings it together."

Judge Krieger was co-chair of the Lesbian and Gay Caucus of the California Democratic Party. He developed a reputation as a civil rights activist and political strategist for Democratic candidates. He inspired and help found the Lawyers for Human Rights (now called the Lesbian and Gay Lawyers Association of Los Angeles) in 1979 and became its second president.

Rabbi Lisa Edwards of Temple Beth Chayim Chadashim recalls that Judge Krieger "used to laugh and sigh with me at the irony that the state of California authorized the two of us to officiate and sign marriage licenses – could even do so for a couple who had been together one day – but that same state of California wouldn't let either of us marry our own partners of so many years." Krieger's life partner was Jon Smith.

== See also ==
- List of LGBT jurists in the United States
