= 43P/Wolf–Harrington =

Periodic comet

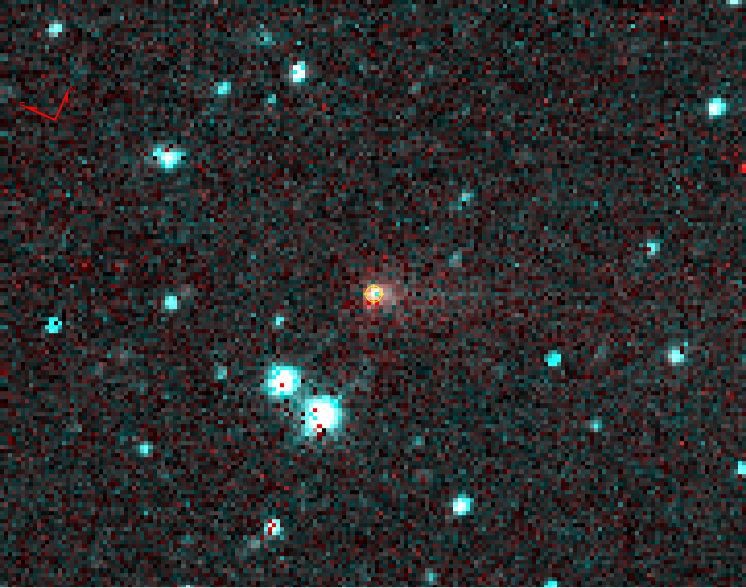
- Infrared image of Comet Wolf–Harrington from NEOWISE on 5 January 2017

Discovery
- Discovered by: Max Wolf; Robert G. Harrington
- Discovery site: Heidelberg, Germany (024)
- Discovery date: 22 December 1924

Designations
- MPC designation: P/1924 Y1, P/1951 T2
- Alternative designations: 1924 IV, 1952 II, 1958 V; 1965 III, 1971 VI; 1984 XVIII, 1991 V

Orbital characteristics
- Epoch: 21 November 2025 (JD 2461000.5)
- Observation arc: 100.99 years
- Number of observations: 2,924
- Aphelion: 6.219 AU
- Perihelion: 2.443 AU
- Semi-major axis: 4.331 AU
- Eccentricity: 0.43596
- Orbital period: 9.02 years
- Inclination: 9.330°
- Longitude of ascending node: 243.98°
- Argument of periapsis: 223.79°
- Mean anomaly: 11.856°
- Last perihelion: 4 August 2025
- Next perihelion: 1 August 2034
- T_{Jupiter}: 2.745
- Earth MOID: 1.014 AU
- Jupiter MOID: 0.033 AU

Physical characteristics
- Mean radius: 2.36 km (1.47 mi)
- Comet total magnitude (M1): 10.3
- Comet nuclear magnitude (M2): 13.9

The Outward Migration of 43P
Year (epoch)	2017	2020	2025
Semi-major axis	3.35	4.30	4.33
Perihelion	1.35	2.39	2.44
Aphelion	5.34	6.20	6.22

43P/Wolf–Harrington is a Jupiter-family comet discovered on December 22, 1924, by Max Wolf from the Heidelberg Observatory. In 2019, it passed within 0.065 AU (9.7 million km; 6.0 million mi) of Jupiter, which lifted the perihelion point and increased the orbital period to 9 years. The comet last came to perihelion in August 2025 and will return to perihelion in August 2034.

During the 1997 apparition the comet reached an apparent magnitude a little bit brighter than 12.

The comet had an unfavorable apparition in 2010, because during perihelion (closest approach to the Sun), the comet was only 10 degrees from the Sun as seen from Earth. The comet was not more favorably positioned in the sky until mid October 2010.

== Physical characteristics ==
Initial estimates in 2004 place the size of the nucleus of Comet Wolf–Harrington about 3.6 km (2.2 mi) in diameter. This was later revised to 4.76 km (2.96 mi) after follow-up observations in 2011.

Numbered comets
Previous; 42P/Neujmin	43P/Wolf–Harrington	Next; 44P/Reinmuth
