= Daniel R. Altschuler =

Uruguayan physicist (born 1944)

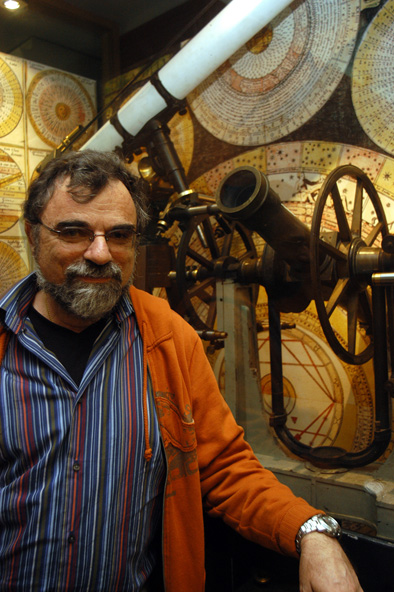
image of Daniel Altschuler

Daniel R. Altschuler (born 1944 in Montevideo) is a Uruguayan physicist linked in his professional activity to the Arecibo Radio Telescope in Puerto Rico, where he was director from 1992 to 2003. He is a writer, known for his science outreach work, and is very sensitive to the distinction between science and pseudoscience. In 2010 he received the Andrew Gemant Award from the American Institute of Physics.

== Biography ==
Daniel Altschuler was born in Montevideo, Uruguay, the son of German immigrants. He grew up speaking German at home and Spanish in the street. He entered the Faculty of Engineering at the Universidad de la República in Uruguay and then obtained a scholarship to continue studies at Duke University in Durham, North Carolina, where he earned his bachelor's degree in engineering.

He arrived in Puerto Rico in 1979 and entered the faculty of the Inter-American University in San Germán. In 1981 he was appointed professor in the Department of Physics at the University of Puerto Rico in Río Piedras, San Juan. In 1989 he was invited to work at the Arecibo Radio Telescope, and in 1991 he was appointed director of that institution, a position he held until 2003. He then headed the Observatory’s office for scientific outreach.

He completed his graduate studies at Brandeis University in Waltham, Massachusetts, where he earned a doctorate in physics, after which he did postgraduate studies at the University of Maryland. His research relates to quasars and hydrogen in galaxies.

His concern about the lack of scientific knowledge across a large sector of the public, and his great interest in scientific dissemination, has motivated him to give conferences and talks across the globe (e.g. Madrid, Johannesburg, Montevideo).

He is Professor of Physics at the University of Puerto Rico in Río Piedras.

In 2010 he received the Andrew Gemant Award from the American Institute of Physics for his contribution to science education.

== Bibliography ==
- Cosmology and Elementary Particles (with José F. Nieves), ISBN 978-9971-5-0654-4
- Hijos de las estrellas, ISBN 978-84-460-2270-1. (tr. "Children of the stars")
- Ciencia, pseudociencias y educación (with J. Medín y E. Nuñez) ISBN 9781881748281 (tr. "Science, pseudosciences and education")
- Mokita en blanco y negro. ISBN 978-84-95440-81-5 (tr. "Mokita in black and white")
- Extraterrestres, humanos, dioses y estrellas, ISBN 978-84-92509-05-8. (tr. "Aliens, humans, gods and stars")
- Altschuler, Daniel R.; Salter, Christopher J. (2013). "The Arecibo Observatory: Fifty astronomical years". Physics Today. 66 (11): 43. Bibcode:2013PhT....66k..43A. doi:10.1063/PT.3.2179
- The Women of the Moon: Tales of Science, Love, Sorrow, and Courage (With Fernando J. Ballesteros, 2019) ISBN 978-0198844419

== Awards ==
- 2002 Altschuler's book Hijos de las estrellas received second Prize from the Instituto de Literatura Puertorriqueña.
- 2004 he received second Prize from periodismo Bolivar Pagan del Instituto de Literatura Puertorriqueña, for his career in publishing articles in the field of scientific outreach.
- 2005 he received first Prize in literature in Puerto Rico, for the book “Ciencia, pseudociencia y educación” (jointly written with J. Medín y E. Nuñez).
- 2010 he received the Andrew Gemant Award of the American Institute of Physics.
