= Stephen P. Maran =

American astronomer

Stephen P. Maran is an American astronomer and popularizer who is known for his books, articles, and popular lectures for the general public, including Astronomy For Dummies.

== Early life ==
Maran was born in Brooklyn, where he experienced astronomy by visiting the Hayden Planetarium and by viewing the sky from a deserted Bronx golf course. He graduated from New York's Stuyvesant High School in 1955, then received the bachelor's degree in physics from Brooklyn College in 1959. His postgraduate work at the University of Michigan earned him the M.A. and Ph.D. degrees in astronomy in 1961 and 1964, respectively. He is married to journalist Sally Scott Maran, with whom he has three children, Enid, Elissa, and Michael(deceased).

== Career ==
Maran was an astrophysicist at NASA's Goddard Space Flight Center for 35 years, from 1969-2004. During this time, he served as a staff scientist, Project Scientist, and Principal Investigator, and was involved in research on a number of missions, including the Hubble Space Telescope. He was the Assistant Director of Space Sciences for Information and Outreach from 1995–2004, and was the original moderator for the NASA televised show Space Astronomy Update, begun in 1991.

He served for 25 years (1984-2009) as the Press Officer for the American Astronomical Society.

== Awards ==
Maran was awarded a NASA Exceptional Achievement Medal in 1991. He is winner of the 1999 Klumpke-Roberts Award, the 2007 George Van Biesbroeck Prize and the 2011 Andrew Gemant Award.

Minor planet 9768 Stephenmaran, discovered in 1992, was named in his honor by the International Astronomical Union

== Books ==
- Maran, Stephen (1991). The Astronomy and Astrophysics Encyclopedia. John Wiley & Sons, Inc. ISBN 978-0471289418.
- Maran, Stephen (2012). Astronomy for Dummies (3rd ed.). Wiley Publishing, Inc. ISBN 978-1118376973.
- Maran, Stephen (2009). Galileo's New Universe:The Revolution In Our Understanding of the Cosmos. BenBella Books Inc. ISBN 978-1-933771-59-5.
- Stephen P. Maran and Laurence A. Marschall, 2009, Pluto Confidential: An Insider Account of the Ongoing Battles over the Status of Pluto, Benbella Books, Inc., isbn+978-1933771-80-9
