= Scott Pace =

American academic (born 1959)

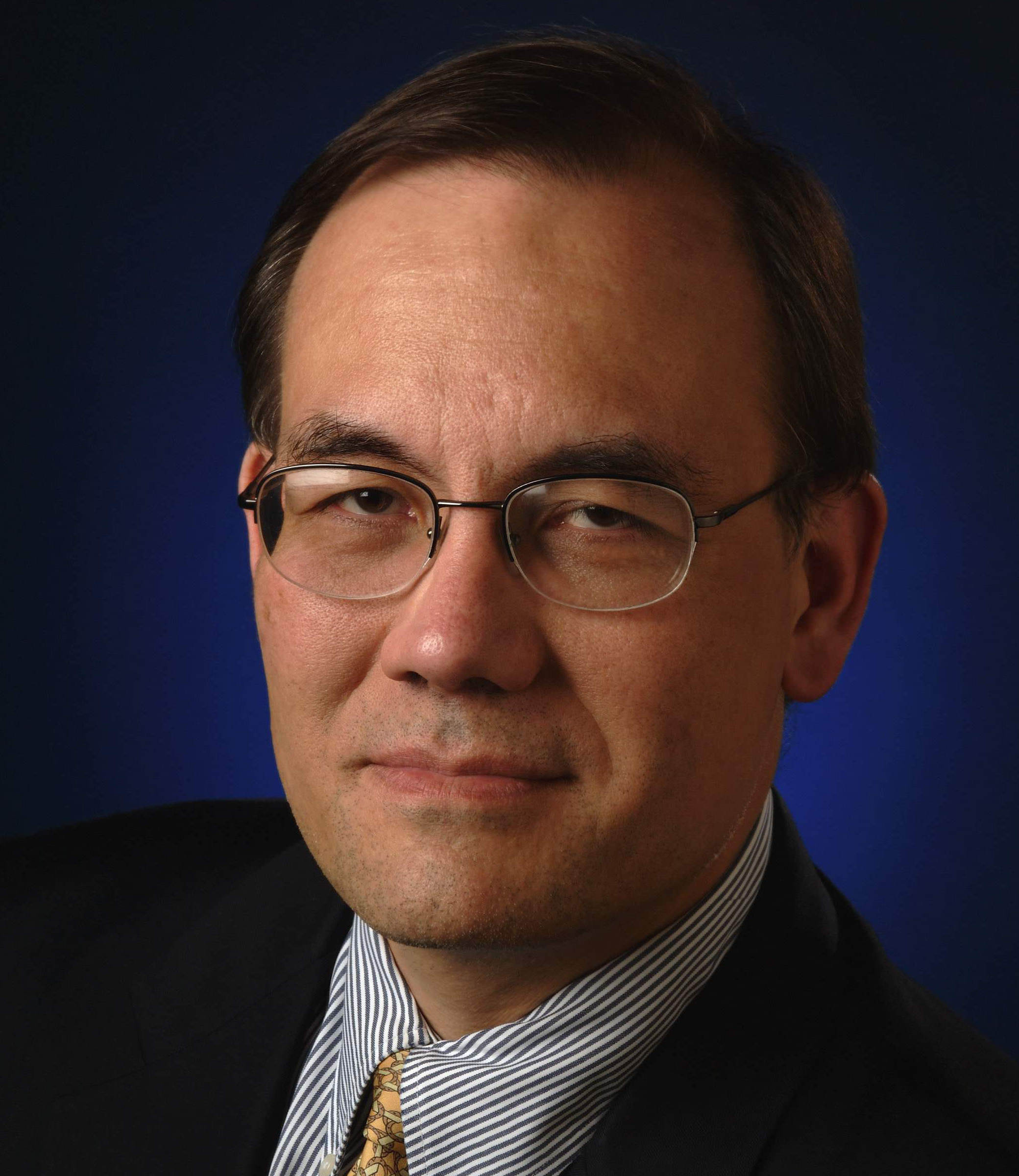

Executive Secretary of the National Space Council
- In office July 13, 2017 – January 1, 2021
- President: Donald Trump

Personal details
- Born: Scott Norman Pace; January 23, 1959 (age 66); Los Angeles, California, U.S.
- Political party: Republican
- Education: Harvey Mudd College (BS); Massachusetts Institute of Technology (MS); Pardee Rand Graduate School (PhD)

Scott Norman Pace (born January 23, 1959) currently serves as Director of the Space Policy Institute, Director of the Institute for International Science and Technology Policy and Director of the MA International Science and Technology Policy program at the George Washington University's Elliott School of International Affairs. He served as the Executive Secretary of the National Space Council from July 2017 to January 2021, when he resigned.

== Early life and education ==
Scott Norman Pace was born on January 23, 1959, in Burbank, Los Angeles, California, USA, the only child of Ord Boorem Pace and Nobie Kamei. In 1975, while in high school, he attended a program for advanced science students, the Summer Science Program. In 1980 Scott Pace received a Bachelor of Science in Physics from Harvey Mudd College and went on to the Massachusetts Institute of Technology where he got master's degrees in Aeronautics and Astronautics and Technology and Policy in 1982. On January 10, 1987, he married Dana Johnson.

== Career ==
Scott Pace worked for the RAND Corporation's Science and Technology Policy Institute from 1993 to 2001. He played a role in adding and preserving radio navigation satellite spectrum at the 1997 and 2000 World Radiocommunication Conferences. He also was a member of Department of Defense Senior Review Group on Commercial Remote Sensing and the National Research Council's Committee on Earth Sciences.

From 2001 to 2002, he was the Assistant Director for Space and Aeronautics in the White House Office of Science and Technology Policy, during the presidency of George W. Bush. There, he was responsible for space and aviation-related issues and coordination of civil and commercial space issues through the Space Policy Coordinating Committee of the National Security Council.

From 2002-2008, he worked at NASA, becoming the Associate Administrator for Program Analysis and Evaluation in 2005. In this capacity, he was responsible for providing objective studies and analyses in support of policy, program and budget decisions by the NASA Administrator. At NASA, he participated in negotiations that resulted in the 2004 GPS-Galileo Agreement between the United States and the European Commission.

In September 2008, Scott Pace became a Professor of the Practice of International Affairs at George Washington University. He was also named the director of the Space Policy Institute at that university's Elliott School of International Affairs. The Institute's activities are centered on policy issues concerning the United States' space program and its relationships to the programs of other countries. The Institute facilitates cooperation between researchers, analysts, and students related to future efforts in space. He also serves on the board of trustees of the Summer Science Program.

Pace has also worked at the US Department of Commerce. He is a member of the board of trustees of the Universities Space Research Association, a Corresponding Member of the International Academy of Astronautics, and a member of the board of governors of the National Space Society.

== Politics ==
Pace was the chair of 2012 Republican Presidential candidate Mitt Romney's Space Policy Advisory Group. Pace wrote that Romney is the only 2012 presidential candidate with "the leadership, management skill, and commitment to American exceptionalism" to restore "the U.S. space program to greatness." Pace stated in 2012 that the 2020 date Newt Gingrich suggested for a lunar base was feasible when it was proposed in 2005, but it is no longer. Pace said a return to the Moon is doable, but it is hard to figure out when NASA could achieve this.

It is not clear that NASA will ever send another crewed rocket into space, according to Pace. "It may be one where NASA simply buys commercial launch services, or it may be that NASA decides that it really does need to have a government-owned and operated vehicle. You know, the existence of commercial airline services does not mean we don't have military cargo transports. We have both. And we use each as appropriate."

He was appointed as a NASA associate administrator by George W. Bush and supported Bush's plan to return to the moon. He was disappointed that President Barack Obama cancelled those plans. Pace stated in 2011, "Space leadership is highly symbolic of national capabilities and international influence, and a decline in space leadership will be seen as symbolic of a relative decline in U.S. power and influence."

== National Space Council ==
On July 13, 2017, President Donald Trump announced his intent to nominate Pace to be the Executive Secretary of the National Space Council. Pace’s selection was expected and warmly received by those in government and industry. On January 1, 2021, Pace resigned from this position.

== Awards ==
Scott Pace has received the following awards:

- NASA Group Achievement Award, Columbia Accident Rapid Reaction Team, in 2004
- U.S. Department of State’s Group Superior Honor Award, GPS Interagency Team, in 2005
- NASA Outstanding Leadership Medal in 2008
- Order of the Rising Sun, 2nd Class, Gold and Silver Star, in 2021
