= Robert George Harrington =

American astronomer

Robert George Harrington (December 3, 1904 – June 15, 1987) was an American astronomer who worked at Palomar Observatory. He should not be confused with Robert Sutton Harrington, who was also an astronomer, but was born later and worked at the US Naval Observatory.

He discovered or co-discovered a number of comets, including periodic comets 43P/Wolf–Harrington, 51P/Harrington (discovered in 1953), 52P/Harrington–Abell (discovered jointly with George Ogden Abell in 1955) and the comet/asteroid 107P/Wilson–Harrington, which he and Albert Wilson discovered in 1949 and which had become an asteroid by 1988.

Harrington discovered the dwarf galaxies Leo I and Leo II and co-discovered the globular cluster Palomar 12 with Fritz Zwicky.

The asteroid 3216 Harrington was not named after Robert George Harrington, but rather after Robert Sutton Harrington. Harrington's name is, however, associated with the asteroid/comet 107P/Wilson–Harrington.
