= Andrew Gemant =

Hungarian physicist

- Born: 27 July 1895; Nagyvarad, Hungary
- Died: 1 February 1983 (aged 87)
- Education: University of Budapest; University of Berlin
- Scientific career
- Workplaces: University of Wisconsin; Wayne State University

Andrew Gemant (27 July 1895 – 1 February 1983) was a renowned physicist, remembered in part by the eponymous Andrew Gemant Award. His work included a series of fundamental papers on viscoelasticity and fractional differentials, published in the mid 20th Century. Andrew Gemant was born in Nagyvarad, Hungary on 27 July 1895. He served in the Austro-Hungarian army as a medical student during the World War I and received his M.D. from the University of Budapest in 1919. During 1920-1922 he attended the University of Berlin and worked in the laboratories of Leonor Michaelis and Herbert Freundlich. He received his Ph.D. in physics in 1922. From 1923-1924, Gemant was a research physicist at Radiologie Inc, an X-ray tube manufacturer in Berlin. From 1925-1931 he was a research physicist at Siemens-Schuckert Cable Company. He held a privat-docent position at the Technische Hochschule in Charlottenburg (now Technische Universität Berlin) from 1929-1933, and from 1932-1933 he was a researcher at the Heinrich Hertz Institute (HHI) for Research on Oscillations. In 1933 Gemant was dismissed from his research and teaching positions by the National Socialist (Nazi) government. He and his wife Susi (Sophia Ida Marie), whom he had recently married, subsequently left Germany for England, and from 1934-1937 Gemant was a research associate in the Engineering Laboratory of Oxford University. The Gemants then moved to the United States, where from 1938-1939 he was a research associate in the electrical engineering department at the University of Wisconsin. From 1940-1960 Gemant was a staff physicist at the Detroit Edison Company. He subsequently held positions as a research associate at Grace Hospital in Detroit, Michigan from 1961-1971 and in Wayne State University's department of biochemistry from 1972-1983. He died on 1 February 1983 at the age of 87.

Andrew Gemant performed research in the areas of: X-ray fluorescence; pH of aqueous solutions; high voltage physics; dielectrics; colloids; acoustics; viscosity and internal friction of solids; electrets; electrochemistry of oils; radioactive tracers in solutions; high voltage cables; oxidative and photochemical ions in hydrocarbons; ion-exchange resins in hydrocarbons; solubilization of cholesterol; carcinogenesis; enzymic oxidative degradation of protein in senescence; and the reduction by chemical means of the reactivity of DNA (deoxyribonucleic acid) toward hydrogen peroxide in order to mitigate symptoms of aging. Andrew Gemant introduced the concept of complex viscosity which is often used for characterizing the viscous and elastic contributions to the rheological response measured in oscillatory shear experiments.

(Most of the biographical information provided here is based on biographical note provided in American Institute of Physics Niels Bohr Library & Archives, that has collected papers, poems, novels and personal communication by Andrew Gemant.)
