= Ainissa Ramirez =

American materials scientist and science communicator

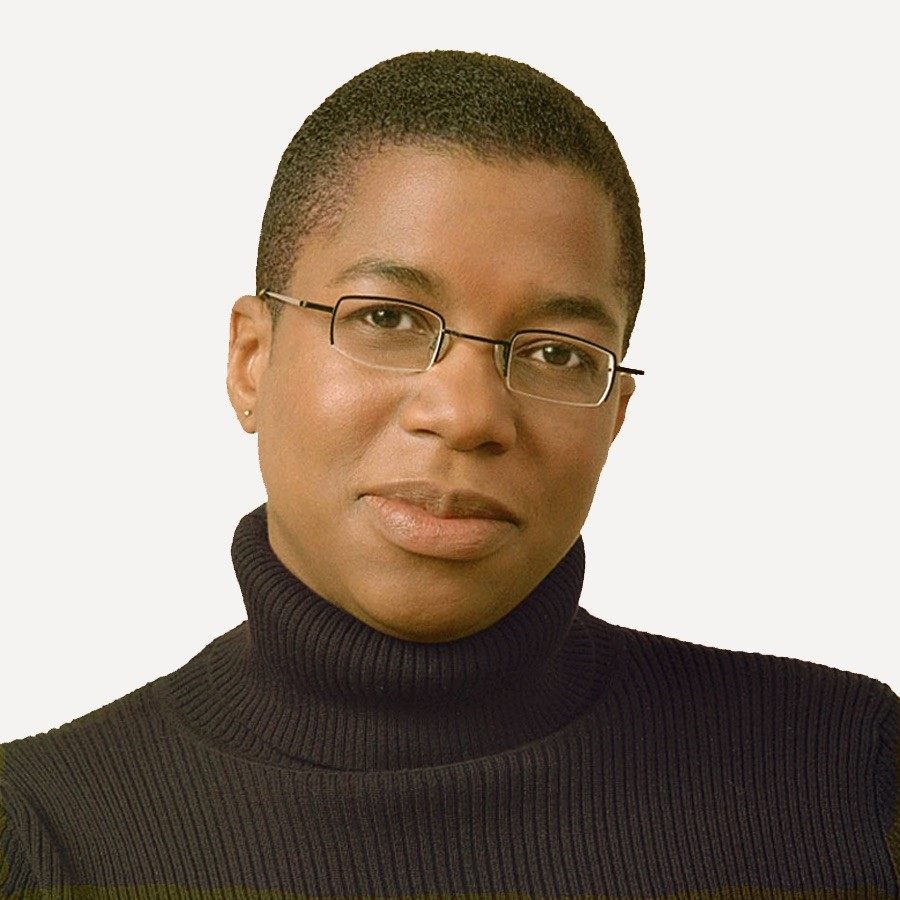
- Born: New York, New York, U.S.
- Education: Brown University; Stanford University
- Scientific career
- Fields: Materials science; Science communication
- Workplaces: Bell Laboratories; Yale University; Massachusetts Institute of Technology
- Thesis: Mechanisms and effects of wear on amorphous carbon thin films
- Doctoral advisor: Robert Sinclair
- Website: www.ainissaramirez.com

Ainissa Ramirez (born 1969) is an American materials scientist and science communicator. She focuses on making science education content accessible to the general public through a variety avenues such as public programming, talks, books and podcasts. She is the author of The Alchemy of Us (2021) and Spark: Jim West's Electrifying Adventures in Creating the Microphone (2025). She also hosts the short-form podcast, Science Underground.

== Early life and education ==
Ramirez credits watching the PBS television show 3-2-1 Contact growing up for inspiring her to pursue science, where she saw a young black girl solving problems and enjoying science. Ramirez attended an all-girls Catholic high school in Jersey City, New Jersey. To prepare to pursue a science degree in college, she took classes in calculus and electrical engineering at Stevens Institute of Technology on Saturdays.

Ramirez earned a Sc.B. in Materials Science from Brown University in 1990.

She earned her Ph.D. in Materials Science and Engineering from Stanford University in 1998. Her dissertation is titled Mechanisms and effects of wear on amorphous carbon thin films with Robert Sinclair serving as her dissertation adviser. As a graduate student, she was a science correspondent for Time magazine's Washington, D.C. bureau, which inspired her on a pathway for communicating science.

== Career ==
From 2003 to 2011, Ramirez was an Assistant, then Associate Professor, in the Mechanical and Materials Science Department at Yale University, where she taught an undergraduate course entitled "Introduction to Materials Science". Prior to being on the faculty at Yale, for four years she was a member of technical staff at Bell Laboratories, Lucent Technologies. She co-developed a "universal solder" that can bond metal to glass, ceramics, diamond, and semiconductor oxide substrates. Ramirez has been a visiting professor at MIT.

In 2004, she founded Science Saturdays, a program of entertaining science lectures for middle school children.

In 2012, Ramirez gave a TED talk on the main stage in Los Angeles on the importance of STEM education.

After 10 years at Yale, Ramirez made a career change from academia and became a self-declared "science evangelist". She hosts two short science video series called Science Xplained and Material Marvels. She also produces a podcast series called Science Underground.

In 2013, Ramirez published the TED book Save Our Science: How to Inspire a New Generation of Scientists. The book asks for a recommitment to improve STEM education for schools and throughout society. In the same year, Ramirez co-authored a book with Allen St. John titled Newton's Football: The Science Behind America's Game, which discusses the science behind American football.

In 2020, Ramirez published the book The Alchemy of Us: How Humans and Matter Transformed One Another, which explores eight significant inventions and the little-known inventors behind them, particularly people of color and women. Ramirez states that the clock and artificial lighting helped end pre-industrial habits of nightly biphasic sleep. The book documents Carl Sagan's process of including global music on the Voyager Golden Record. Other inventions include copper communication cables, hard disks, photographic film, scientific glassware, silicon chips, and steel rails. Smithsonian listed the book in their Ten Best Science Books of 2020.

In 2025, Ramirez published the first book in her Black Innovators children book series, titled Spark: Jim West's Electrifying Adventures in Creating the Microphone. The second book is North, South, East, and Gladys West: How a Mathematician Helped Shape GPS. The series is a set of picture book biographies, published by MIT Kids, about the lives and scientific contributions of Black inventors.

== Bibliography and media ==
=== Books ===
- Newton's Football: The Science Behind America's Game (2013)
- Save Our Science (2013)
- The Alchemy of Us: How Humans and Matter Transformed One Another (2020)
- Spark: Jim West's Electrifying Adventures in Creating the Microphone (2025)
- North, South, East, and Gladys West: How a Mathematician Helped Shape GPS (2026)

=== Podcasts ===
- Science Underground (2015-2025)

=== Television ===
- SciTech Now (guest, 2016-2019)

== Awards and honors ==
Select recognitions for her research, outreach, and book publications include:

- 2003 – named MIT Technology Review Innovator Under 35 for formulating an advanced universal solder for electronics and optics.
- 2015 winner of the Andrew Gemant award, for doing "a brave thing" and not only producing research, but encouraging everyone to think about science. The award is sponsored by the American Institute of Physics, where Ramirez received $3,000 to further public communication of physics to her designated institution of choice, and she selected the Marion Branch Library of Jersey City, New Jersey.
- 2021 winner of the Young Adult Science Book Award by the 2021 AAAS/Subaru SB&F Prize for Excellence in Science Books for The Alchemy of Us: How Humans and Matter Transformed One Another.
- 2021 Finalist of The LA Times Book Prize in Science and Technology for The Alchemy of Us: How Humans and Matter Transformed One Another.
- 2021 Fellow of the American Physical Society.
