= Publications of the Astronomical Society of the Pacific =

- Discipline: Astronomy, Astrophysics
- Language: English
- Edited by: Jeff Mangum

Publication details
- History: 1889–present
- Publisher: IOP Publishing for the Astronomical Society of the Pacific
- Frequency: Monthly
- Open access: Hybrid and delayed
- Impact factor: 3.3 (2023)

Standard abbreviations
- ISO 4: Publ. Astron. Soc. Pac.

Indexing
- ISSN: 1538-3873 (print); 0004-6280 (web)

Links
- Journal homepage

Publications of the Astronomical Society of the Pacific (often abbreviated as PASP in references and literature) is a monthly peer-reviewed scientific journal managed by the Astronomical Society of the Pacific. It publishes research and review papers, instrumentation papers and dissertation summaries in the fields of astronomy and astrophysics. Between 1999 and 2016 it was published by the University of Chicago Press and since 2016, it has been published by IOP Publishing. The current editor-in-chief is Jeff Mangum of the National Radio Astronomy Observatory.

PASP has been published monthly since 1899, and along with The Astrophysical Journal, The Astronomical Journal, Astronomy and Astrophysics, and the Monthly Notices of the Royal Astronomical Society, is one of the primary journals for the publication of astronomical research.

== See also ==
- List of astronomy journals
