= National Geographic Society – Palomar Observatory Sky Survey =

Astronomical survey completed in 1958

- Alternative names: NGS-POSS
- Related media on Commons

The National Geographic Society – Palomar Observatory Sky Survey (NGS-POSS, or just POSS, also POSS I) was a major astronomical survey that took almost 2,000 photographic plates of the night sky. It was conducted at Palomar Observatory, California, United States, and completed by the end of 1958.

== Observations ==
The photographs were taken with the 48-inch (1.2 m) Palomar Schmidt telescope at Palomar Observatory, and the astronomical survey was funded by a grant from the National Geographic Society to the California Institute of Technology. Among the primary minds behind the project were Edwin Hubble, Milton L. Humason, Walter Baade, Ira Sprague Bowen and Rudolph Minkowski. The first photographic plate was exposed on November 11, 1949. 99% of the plates were taken by June 20, 1956, but the final 1% was not completed until December 10, 1958.

The survey utilized 14 inches (36 cm) square photographic plates, covering about 6° of sky per side (approximately 36 square degrees per plate). Each region of the sky was photographed twice, once using a red sensitive Kodak 103a-E plate, and once with a blue sensitive Kodak 103a-O plate. This allowed the color of celestial objects to be recorded.

The survey was originally meant to cover the sky from the north celestial pole to -24° declination. This figure specifies the position of the plate center, hence the actual coverage under the original plan would have been to approximately -27°. It was expected that 879 plate pairs would be required. However the Survey was ultimately extended to -30° plate centers, giving irregular coverage to as far south as -34° declination, and utilizing 936 total plate pairs.

The limiting magnitude of the survey varied depending on the region of the sky, but is commonly quoted as 22nd magnitude on average.

== Publication ==
The NGS-POSS was published shortly after the Survey was completed as a collection of 1,872 photographic negative prints each measuring 14" x 14". In the early 1970s there was another "printing" of the Survey, this time on 14" x17" photographic negative prints.

The California Institute of Technology bookstore used to sell prints of selected POSS regions. The regions were chosen to support educational exercises and the set was a curriculum teaching tool.

In 1962, the Whiteoak Extension, comprising 100 red-sensitive plates extending coverage to -42° declination, was completed and published as identically sized photographic negative prints. The Whiteoak Extension is often found in libraries stored as an appendix or companion to the photographic print edition of the NGS-POSS. This brings the number of prints to 1,972 for most holders of a photographic edition of the NGS-POSS.

In 1981, a set of NGS-POSS Transparency Overlay Maps was published by Robert S. Dixon of the Ohio State University. This work is commonly found wherever a photographic print edition of the NGS-POSS is held.

== Derivative works ==
Many astronomical catalogs are partial derivatives of the NGS-POSS (e.g. Abell Catalog of Planetary Nebulae), which was used for decades for purposes of cataloging and categorizing celestial objects, especially in studies of galaxy morphology.

Innumerable astronomical objects were discovered by astronomers studying the NGS-POSS photographs.

In 1986, work was begun on a digital version of the NGS-POSS. Eight years later, the scanning of the original NGS-POSS plates was completed. The resulting digital images were compressed and published as the Digitized Sky Survey in 1994. The Digitized Sky Survey was made available on a set of 102 CD-ROMs, and can also be queried through several web interfaces.

In 1996, an even more compressed version, RealSky, was marketed by the Astronomical Society of the Pacific.

In 2001, a catalog identifying over 89 million objects on the NGS-POSS was placed online as part of the Minnesota Automated Plate Scanner Catalog of the POSS I. The catalog was also distributed in a set of 4 DVD-ROMs. The catalog contains accurate sky positions and brightness measurements for all of these objects as well as more esoteric parameters such as ellipticity, position angle, and concentration index.

== See also ==
- Southern Sky Survey
- Palomar Observatory Sky Survey II
- Two Micron All-Sky Survey
- Sloan Digital Sky Survey
