= Kip Thorne =

American physicist, writer, and Nobel Laureate (born 1940)

- Thorne in 2022
- Born: Kip Stephen Thorne; June 1, 1940 (age 86); Logan, Utah, U.S.
- Education: California Institute of Technology (BS); Princeton University (MS, PhD)
- Known for: Gravitation (1973); Gravitational-wave astronomy Hartle–Thorne metric Hoop conjecture Interstellar (2014); LIGO; Membrane paradigm Roman arch Thorne–Hawking–Preskill bet Thorne-Żytkow object C-energy
- Spouses: Linda Jean Peterson (m. 1960; div. 1977) Carolee Joyce Winstein (m. 1984)
- Children: 2
- Awards: Lilienfeld Prize (1996); Albert Einstein Medal (2009); Special Breakthrough Prize in Fundamental Physics (2016); Gruber Prize in Cosmology (2016); Shaw Prize (2016); Kavli Prize (2016); Harvey Prize (2016); Princess of Asturias Award (2017); Nobel Prize in Physics (2017); Lewis Thomas Prize (2018)
- Scientific career
- Fields: Astrophysics; Gravitational physics
- Workplaces: California Institute of Technology; Cornell University
- Thesis: Geometrodynamics of cylindrical systems (1965)
- Doctoral advisor: John Archibald Wheeler
- Doctoral students: William L. Burke; Carlton M. Caves; Lee Samuel Finn; Sándor J. Kovács; David L. Lee; Alan Lightman; Don N. Page; William H. Press; Richard H. Price; Bernard F. Schutz; Sherry Suyu; Saul Teukolsky; Michele Vallisneri; Clifford Martin Will

Kip Stephen Thorne (born June 1, 1940) is an American astrophysicist and author. He shared the 2017 Nobel Prize in Physics with Rainer Weiss and Barry C. Barish "for decisive contributions to the LIGO detector and the observation of gravitational waves".

With John A. Wheeler and Charles Misner, he coauthored the general relativity textbook Gravitation in 1973. He has also written popular science, notably Black Holes and Time Warps in 1994 which was awarded the Phi Beta Kappa Award in Science for that year.

Thorne was the Richard P. Feynman Professor of Theoretical Physics at Caltech from 1991 until 2009. A longtime friend and colleague of Stephen Hawking and Carl Sagan, he advised Sagan on the physics of wormholes for his novel Contact. He was a scientific consultant for Christopher Nolan's films Interstellar and Tenet. He received the 2018 Lewis Thomas Prize for science writing.

== Life and career ==
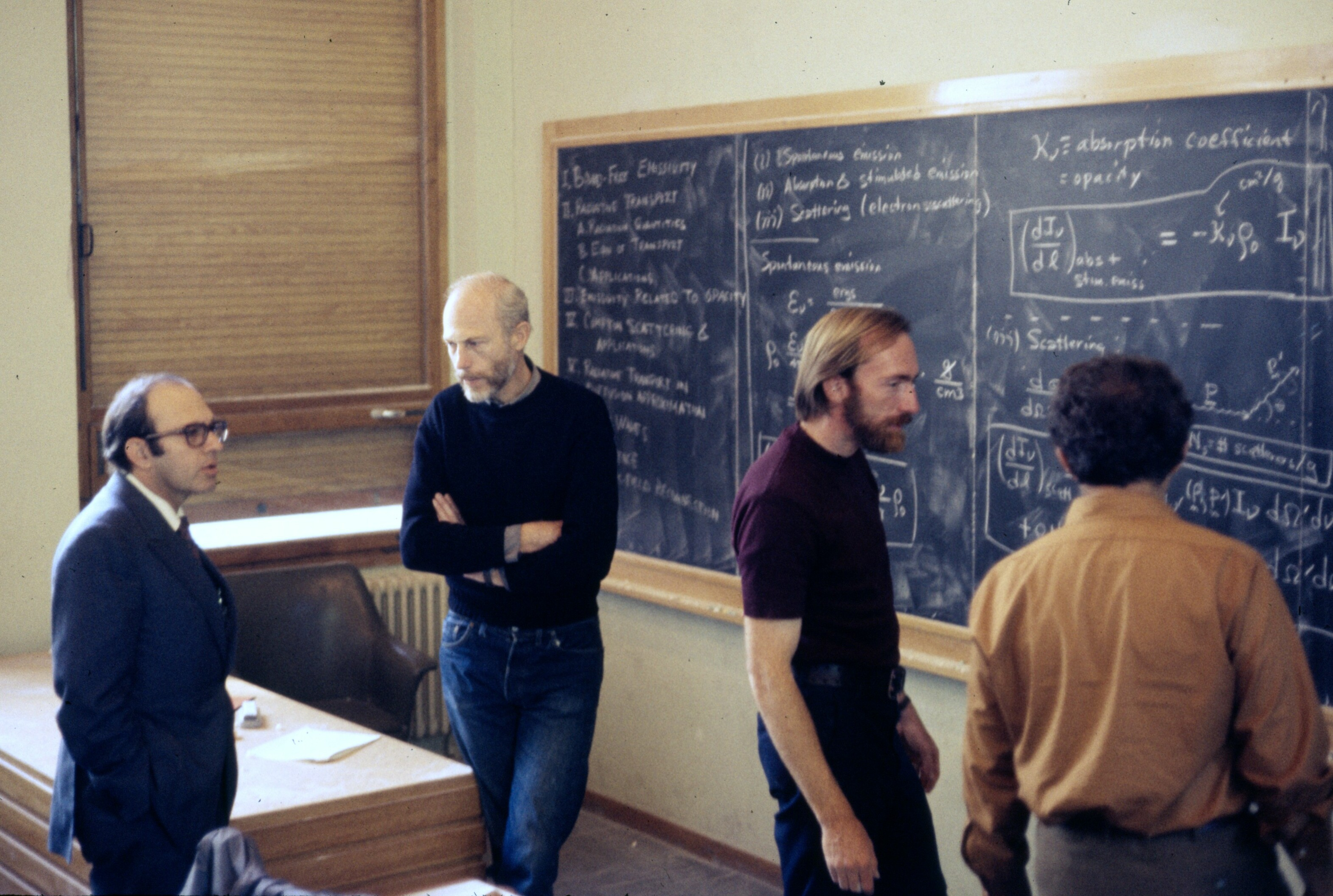
Discussion in the main lecture hall at the École de Physique des Houches (Les Houches Physics School), 1972. From left, Yuval Ne'eman, Bryce DeWitt, Thorne, Demetrios Christodoulou.

Thorne was born on June 1, 1940, in Logan, Utah. His father, D. Wynne Thorne (1908–1979), was a professor of soil chemistry at Utah State University, and his mother, Alison (née Comish; 1914–2004), was an economist and the first woman to receive a PhD in economics from Iowa State College. Raised in an academic environment, two of his four siblings also became professors. Thorne's parents were members of the Church of Jesus Christ of Latter-day Saints (LDS Church) and raised Thorne in the LDS faith, though he now identifies as an atheist. Shortly before his mother's death, she urged Kip and his siblings to leave the LDS Church because of its discrimination against women, which they all did. Regarding his views on science and religion, Thorne has stated: "There are large numbers of my finest colleagues who are quite devout and believe in God .... There is no fundamental incompatibility between science and religion. I happen to not believe in God."

Thorne excelled at academics early in life, winning recognition in the Westinghouse Science Talent Search as a senior at Logan High School. He received his BS in physics degree from Caltech in 1962, and his master and PhD in physics from Princeton University in 1964 and 1965 under the supervision of John Archibald Wheeler with a doctoral dissertation on Geometrodynamics of Cylindrical Systems.

He returned to Caltech as an associate professor in 1967 and became a professor of theoretical physics in 1970, becoming one of the youngest full professors in the history of Caltech at age 30. He became the William R. Kenan Jr. Professor in 1981, and the Feynman Professor of Theoretical Physics in 1991. He was an adjunct professor at the University of Utah from 1971 to 1998 and Andrew D. White Professor at Large at Cornell University from 1986 to 1992. Since 2009, Thorne has been the Feynman Professor of Theoretical Physics, emeritus.

Thorne and Linda Jean Peterson married in 1960. Their children are Kares Anne and Bret Carter, an architect. Thorne and Peterson divorced in 1977. Thorne was set up on a blind date with Lynda Obst, later a film producer, by physicist Carl Sagan. They dated in 1979–1980, and parted and remained friends, to the extent that they later collaborated on the movie Interstellar. Thorne and his second wife, Carolee Joyce Winstein, a professor of biokinesiology and physical therapy at USC, married in 1984. In 2015, he collaborated with Obst and Stephen Hawking on a movie script, for which they wrote several drafts.

Throughout the years, Thorne has served as a mentor and thesis advisor to many students who became leaders in observational, experimental, or astrophysical aspects of general relativity. Approximately 50 physicists have received PhDs at Caltech under Thorne's personal mentorship.

Thorne is known for his ability to convey the excitement and significance of discoveries in gravitation and astrophysics to both professional and lay audiences. His presentations on subjects such as black holes, gravitational radiation, relativity, time travel, and wormholes have been included in PBS shows in the U.S. and on the BBC in the United Kingdom.

In 2017, Thorne gave the George Gamow Memorial Lecture at the University of Colorado Boulder, on “Probing the Warped Side of the Universe with Gravitational Waves: From the Big Bang to Black Holes.”

== Research ==
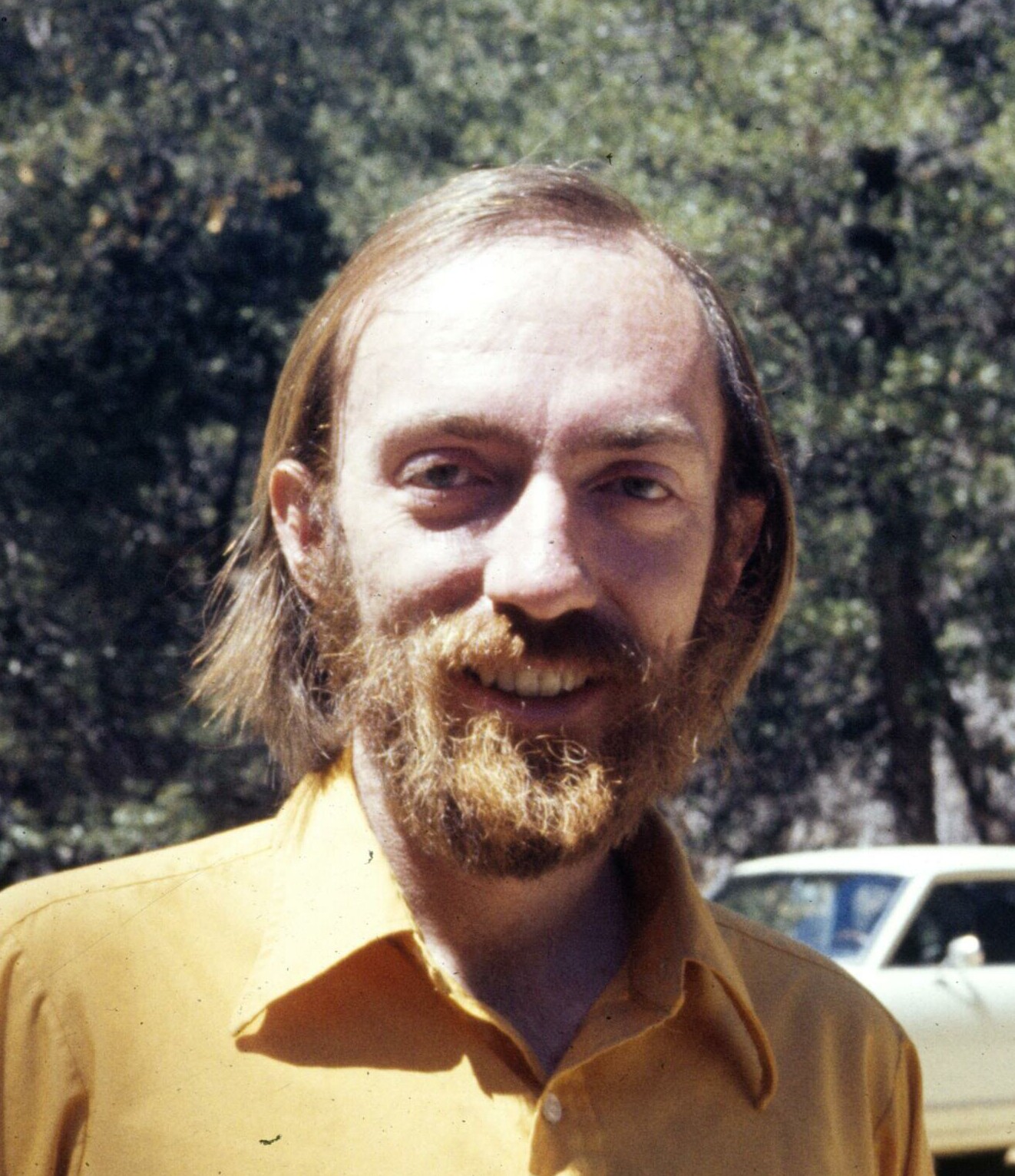
Thorne in 1972

Thorne's research has principally focused on relativistic astrophysics and gravitation physics, with emphasis on relativistic stars, black holes and especially gravitational waves. He is perhaps best known to the public for his controversial theory that wormholes can conceivably be used for time travel. However, Thorne's scientific contributions, which center on the general nature of space, time, and gravity, span the full range of topics in general relativity.

=== Gravitational waves and LIGO ===
Thorne's work has dealt with the prediction of gravitational wave strengths and their temporal signatures as observed on Earth. These "signatures" are of great relevance to LIGO (Laser Interferometer Gravitational Wave Observatory), a multi-institution gravitational wave experiment for which Thorne has been a leading proponent – in 1984, he cofounded the LIGO Project (the largest project ever funded by the NSF) to discern and measure any fluctuations between two or more 'static' points; such fluctuations would be evidence of gravitational waves, as calculations describe. A significant aspect of his research is developing the mathematics necessary to analyze these objects. Thorne also carries out engineering design analyses for features of the LIGO that cannot be developed on the basis of experiment and he gives advice on data analysis algorithms by which the waves will be sought. He has provided theoretical support for LIGO, including identifying gravitational wave sources that LIGO should target, designing the baffles to control scattered light in the LIGO beam tubes, and – in collaboration with Vladimir Braginsky's (Moscow, Russia) research group – inventing quantum nondemolition designs for advanced gravity-wave detectors and ways to reduce the most serious kind of noise in advanced detectors: thermoelastic noise. With Carlton M. Caves, Thorne invented the back-action-evasion approach to quantum nondemolition measurements of the harmonic oscillators – a technique applicable both in gravitational wave detection and quantum optics.

On February 11, 2016, a team of four physicists (Note: The announcement team were Thorne, David Reitze, Gabriela González, Rainer Weiss, and France A. Córdova.) representing the LIGO Scientific Collaboration, announced that in September 2015, LIGO recorded the signature of two black holes colliding 1.3 billion light-years away. This recorded detection was the first direct observation of the fleeting chirp of a gravitational wave and confirmed a prediction of the general theory of relativity.

=== Black hole cosmology ===
A cylindrical bundle of magnetic field lines

In 1963–1964, Thorne's PhD mentor at Princeton, John Wheeler, assigned him a problem to think about: find out whether or not a cylindrical bundle of repulsive magnetic field lines will implode under its own attractive gravitational force. After several months wrestling with the problem, he proved that it was impossible for cylindrical magnetic field lines to implode.

Thorne determined that the gravitational force can overcome all interior pressure only when an object has been compressed in all directions, as in the case of a spherical star imploding under gravitational force. To express this realization, he proposed his hoop conjecture, which describes an imploding star turning into a black hole when the critical circumference of the designed hoop can be placed around it and set into rotation. That is, any object of mass M around which a hoop of circumference
$$\begin{matrix} \frac{4 \pi GM}{c^2} \end{matrix}$$
can be spun must be a black hole.

Thorne and his students have developed an approach to the theory of black holes called the "membrane paradigm", and used it to clarify the Blandford–Znajek mechanism by which black holes may power some quasars and active galactic nuclei.

Thorne has investigated the quantum statistical mechanical origin of the entropy of a black hole. With his postdoctoral researcher, Wojciech Zurek, he showed that the entropy of a black hole is the logarithm of the number of ways that the hole could have been made.

With Igor Novikov and Don Page, he developed the general relativistic theory of thin accretion disks around black holes, and using this theory he deduced that with a doubling of its mass by such accretion a black hole will be spun up to 0.998 of the maximum spin allowed by general relativity, but not any farther. This is probably the maximum black-hole spin allowed in nature.

=== Wormholes and time travel ===
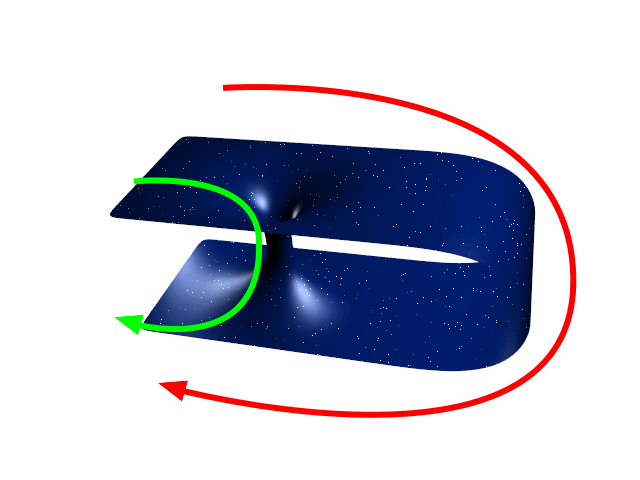
A wormhole is a short cut connecting two separate regions in space. In the figure the green line shows the short way through wormhole, and the red line shows the long way through normal space.

Thorne and his co-workers at Caltech conducted scientific research on whether the laws of physics permit space and time to be multiply connected (can there exist classical, traversable wormholes and "time machines"?). With Sung-Won Kim, Thorne identified a universal physical mechanism (the explosive growth of vacuum polarization of quantum fields), that may always prevent spacetime from developing closed timelike curves (i.e., prevent backward time travel).

With Mike Morris and Ulvi Yurtsever, he showed that traversable wormholes can exist in the structure of spacetime only if they are threaded by quantum fields in quantum states that violate the averaged null energy condition (i.e. have negative renormalized energy spread over a sufficiently large region). This has triggered research to explore the ability of quantum fields to possess such extended negative energy. Recent calculations by Thorne indicate that simple masses passing through traversable wormholes could never engender paradoxes – there are no initial conditions that lead to paradox once time travel is introduced. If his results can be generalized, they would suggest that none of the supposed paradoxes formulated in time travel stories can actually be formulated at a precise physical level: that is, that any situation in a time travel story turns out to permit many consistent solutions.

=== Relativistic stars, multipole moments and other endeavors ===
With Anna Żytkow, Thorne predicted the existence of red supergiant stars with neutron-star cores (Thorne–Żytkow objects). He laid the foundations for the theory of pulsations of relativistic stars and the gravitational radiation they emit. With James Hartle, Thorne derived from general relativity the laws of motion and precession of black holes and other relativistic bodies, including the influence of the coupling of their multipole moments to the spacetime curvature of nearby objects, as well as writing down the Hartle-Thorne metric, an approximate solution which describes the exterior of a slowly and rigidly rotating, stationary and axially symmetric body.

Thorne has also theoretically predicted the existence of universally antigravitating "exotic matter" – the element needed to accelerate the expansion rate of the universe, keep traversable wormhole "Star Gates" open and keep timelike geodesic free float "warp drives" working. With Clifford Will and others of his students, he laid the foundations for the theoretical interpretation of experimental tests of relativistic theories of gravity – foundations on which Will and others then built. As of 2005, Thorne was interested in the origin of classical space and time from the quantum foam of quantum gravity theory.

== Publications ==
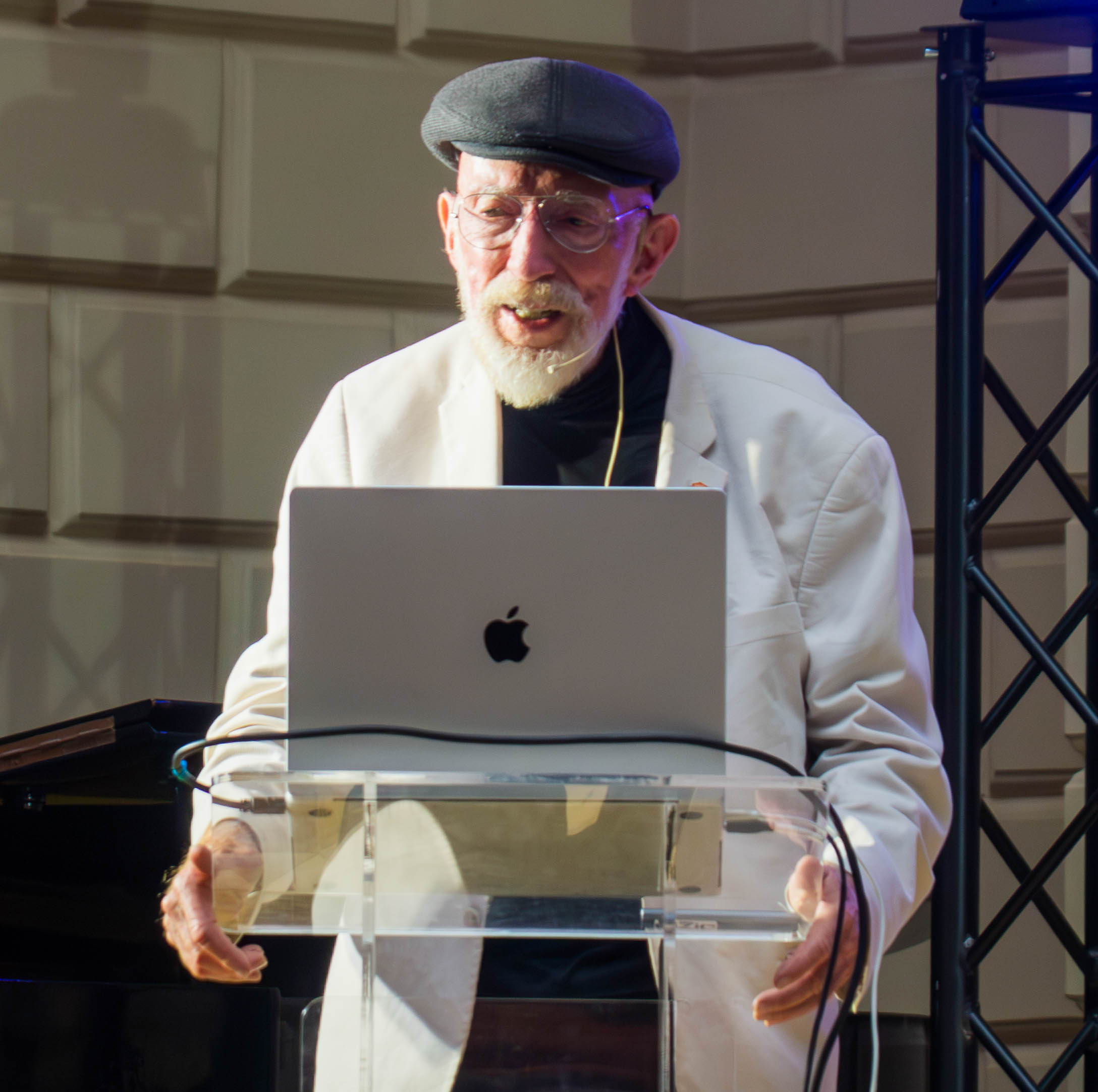
Kip Thorne lecture in Lviv, Ukraine, May 2025

In 1973, Thorne co-authored Gravitation with Charles Misner and John A. Wheeler; that according to John C. Baez and Chris Hillman, is one of the great scientific books of all time and has inspired two generations of students. In 1994, he published Black Holes and Time Warps, a popular science book that traces black holes from John Michell to Stephen Hawking and beyond. It has been published in at least twelve languages: English, German (1994), Spanish (1995), French and Japanese (1997), Greek (1999), Czech (2004), Polish, Chinese and Korean (2005), Thai (2008), and Italian (2013). In 2014, he published The Science of Interstellar, in which he explains the science behind Christopher Nolan's film; Nolan wrote the foreword. In the book Thorne discusses the major role of the fictional black hole Gargantua: "First a weird claim: Black holes are made from warped space and warped time. Nothing else--no matter whatsoever."

In September 2017, Thorne and Roger D. Blandford published Modern Classical Physics: Optics, Fluids, Plasmas, Elasticity, Relativity, and Statistical Physics, a graduate-level textbook covering the six major areas of physics listed in the title. With artist Lia Halloran, Thorne used poetry and illustrations to explore astrophysics in The Warped Side of Our Universe.

Thorne has published more than 150 articles in scholarly journals. His articles have appeared in publications such as Scientific American, the McGraw-Hill Yearbook of Science and Technology, and Collier's Encyclopedia, among others.

== Honors and awards ==
Thorne has been elected to the American Academy of Arts and Sciences (1972), National Academy of Sciences, Russian Academy of Sciences, and American Philosophical Society.

He has been recognized by numerous awards including the:

- American Institute of Physics Science Writing Award in Physics and Astronomy,
- Phi Beta Kappa Science Writing Award,
- American Physical Society's Lilienfeld Prize,
- German Astronomical Society's Karl Schwarzschild Medal (1996),
- Robinson Prize in Cosmology from the University of Newcastle, England,
- Sigma Xi: The Scientific Research Society's Common Wealth Awards for Science and Invention, and
- California Science Center's California Scientist of the Year Award (2003).
- Albert Einstein Medal in 2009 from the Albert Einstein Society, Bern, Switzerland
- UNESCO Niels Bohr Medal from UNESCO (2010)
- Special Breakthrough Prize in Fundamental Physics (2016)
- Gruber Prize in Cosmology (2016)
- Shaw Prize (2016) (together with Ronald Drever and Rainer Weiss).
- Kavli Prize in Astrophysics (2016) (together with Ronald Drever and Rainer Weiss).
- Tomalla Prize (2016) for extraordinary contributions to general relativity and gravity.
- Georges Lemaître Prize (2016)
- Harvey Prize (2016) (together with Ronald Drever and Rainer Weiss).
- Smithsonian Magazine American Ingenuity Award for Physical Sciences (2016)
- Cocconi Prize of the European Physical Society (jointly with Rainer Weiss and Barry Barish)
- Princess of Asturias Award (2017) (jointly with Rainer Weiss and Barry Barish).
- Nobel Prize in Physics (2017) (jointly with Rainer Weiss and Barry Barish)
- Lewis Thomas Prize (2018)
- Golden Plate Award of the American Academy of Achievement (2019)

He has been a Woodrow Wilson Fellow, Danforth Fellow, Guggenheim Fellow, and Fulbright Fellow. He has also received the honorary degree of doctor of humane letters from Claremont Graduate University and an honorary doctorate from the Physics Department of the Aristotle University of Thessaloniki. In 2024 he was awarded an honorary doctorate from University of Cambridge. Thorne received an Honorary Doctor of Science degree from Rochester Institute of Technology in 2026.

He was elected to hold the Lorentz chair for the Leiden University in 2009.

Thorne has served on the:

- International Committee on General Relativity and Gravitation,
- Committee on US-USSR Cooperation in Physics, and
- National Academy of Sciences' Space Science Board, which has advised NASA and Congress on space science policy.

Kip Thorne was selected by Time magazine in an annual list of the 100 most influential people in the American world in 2016.

== Adaptation in media ==
- Thorne contributed ideas on wormhole travel to Carl Sagan for use in his novel Contact.
- Thorne and his friend, producer Lynda Obst, also developed the concept for the Christopher Nolan film Interstellar. He also wrote a tie-in book, The Science of Interstellar. Thorne later advised Nolan on the physics of his movie Tenet, and advised Cillian Murphy on his portrayal of J. Robert Oppenheimer in Nolan's film Oppenheimer.
- In Larry Niven's novel Rainbow Mars, the time travel technology used in the novel is based on the wormhole theories of Thorne, which in the context of the novel was when time travel first became possible, rather than just fantasy. As a result, any attempts to travel in time prior to Thorne's development of wormhole theory results in the time traveller entering a fantastic version of reality, rather than the actual past.
- In the film The Theory of Everything, Thorne was portrayed by actor Enzo Cilenti.
- Thorne played himself in the episode of The Big Bang Theory entitled "The Laureate Accumulation".
- Thorne is featured in an episode of the documentary series The Craftsman entitled "Science, Art & Inspiration".

== Partial bibliography ==
- Misner, Charles W., Thorne, K. S. and Wheeler, John Archibald, Gravitation 1973, (W. H. Freeman & Co)
- Thorne, K. S., in 300 Years of Gravitation, (Eds.) S. W. Hawking and W. Israel, 1987, (Chicago: Univ. of Chicago Press), Gravitational Radiation.
- Thorne, K. S., Price, R. H. and Macdonald, D. M., Black Holes, The Membrane Paradigm, 1986, (New Haven: Yale Univ. Press).
- Friedman, J., Morris, M. S., Novikov, I. D., Echeverria, F., Klinkhammer, G., Thorne, K. S. and Yurtsever, U., Physical Review D., 1990, (in press), Cauchy Problem in Spacetimes with Closed Timelike Curves.
- Kip S. Thorne (1994). Black Holes and Time Warps: Einstein's Outrageous Legacy. W. W. Norton. ISBN 978-0-393-31276-8.
- Thorne, K. S. and Blandford, R. D., Modern Classical Physics: Optics, Fluids, Plasmas, Elasticity, Relativity, and Statistical Physics, 2017, (Princeton: Princeton University Press).
