= The Physics of Star Trek =

Book by Lawrence Krauss

- Author: Lawrence M. Krauss, Stephen Hawking (Foreword)
- Language: English
- Subject: Physics and Star Trek
- Genre: Popular science
- Publisher: HarperPerennial
- Publication date: 1995
- Publication place: United States
- Media type: Print (Hardcover and Paperback)
- Pages: 208
- ISBN: 978-0-465-00559-8 (hardcover); ISBN 978-0-46-500204-7 (revised and updated edition)
- OCLC: 32925425
- Dewey Decimal: 791.45/72 20
- LC Class: QB500 .K65 1995
- Preceded by: Fear of Physics: A Guide for the Perplexed
- Followed by: Beyond Star Trek

The Physics of Star Trek is a 1995 popular science book by the theoretical physicist Lawrence M. Krauss. It is the third book by Krauss, who wrote a follow-up book titled Beyond Star Trek in 1997.

== Overview ==
Krauss discusses the physics involved in various concepts and objects described in the Star Trek universe. He investigates the possibility of such things as inertial dampers and warp drive, and whether physics as we know it would allow such inventions. He also discusses time travel, light speed, pure energy beings, wormholes, teleportation, and other concepts that are staples of the Star Trek universe. The book includes a foreword by cosmologist Stephen Hawking.

The Physics of Star Trek was met with generally positive reviews. It became a national bestseller and sold more than 200,000 copies in the United States. As of 1998, it was being translated into 13 different languages. It was also the basis of a BBC television production.

Krauss got the idea for writing the book from his publisher, who initially suggested it as a joke. Krauss dismissed the idea but later thought that using Star Trek might get people interested in real physics.

The hardcover edition was published in November 1995, and a paperback edition followed in September 1996. The book was revised and updated by Krauss in 2007. Krauss's next book, Beyond Star Trek: Physics from Alien Invasions to the End of Time, was published in 1997.

== Critical reviews ==
Tim Radford of The Guardian commented: "What makes Krauss's book a winner is that it provides a pulpit for a thoughtful sermon on the possibilities locked in a universe that might or might not include a planet called Vulcan and a language called Klingon but that certainly could – in theory - deliver an antigravitational force called vacuum energy... So to reread this book is to be reminded both of how much science has advanced in the past two decades..."

== See also ==
Similarly themed books include:

- Physics and Star Trek
- Physics of the Impossible
- The Physics of Superheroes
- The Science of Star Wars
- The Science of Interstellar
- The Physics of Star Wars
