= Beyond Star Trek =

Book by Lawrence Krauss

Beyond Star Trek: Physics from Alien Invasions to the End of Time
- Hardcover edition
- Author: Lawrence M. Krauss
- Language: English
- Subject: Physics, cosmology
- Genre: Non-fiction
- Published: November 7, 1997
- Publisher: Basic Books
- Publication place: United States
- Media type: Print, e-book
- Pages: 208 pp.
- ISBN: 978-0465006373
- Preceded by: The Physics of Star Trek
- Followed by: Quintessence

Beyond Star Trek: Physics from Alien Invasions to the End of Time is the fourth non-fiction book by the American theoretical physicist Lawrence M. Krauss. The book was initially published on November 7, 1997 by Basic Books and since then has appeared in five foreign editions. In his previous work, The Physics of Star Trek, Lawrence Krauss explained a number of ideas and concepts featured in the series; they may or may not exist in our universe. In this book, Krauss goes further to discuss the realities of physics when it is applied to components from other sci-fi story lines.

== Review ==
A reviewer of Kirkus Reviews wrote "The author...scored a bestseller with his previous book, The Physics of Star Trek (1995). Now he expands his scope to address other sci-fi hits, ranging from the film 2001: A Space Odyssey to TV's The X-Files. He also scrutinizes such newsworthy events as the chess match between world champion Garry Kasparov and an IBM computer. Krauss begins by examining the alien attack on Earth that was portrayed in the movie Independence Day. He uses basic Newtonian physics to show that the gravitational effects of the huge arriving alien ships would have caused floods and earthquakes sufficient to destroy our civilization before the invaders had even fired a shot. Next, the author assesses the supposed flight characteristics of UFOs, depicted as stopping on a dime and making sudden sharp turns at utterly unbelievable speeds. Krauss calculates that these maneuvers would create inertial G-forces greater than a close-range nuclear explosion; neither the pilots nor any conceivable construction material could withstand them. Another chapter examines the cost of mounting an interstellar expedition, a journey that would require many decades to complete and cost more than the moon. Later chapters apply the principle of general relativity to star travel, explore computer consciousness, and forecast the end of the world. "The book concludes by affirming the author's belief that the universe is a place of boundless potential--and that we must fathom it."

== See also ==
- Technology in Star Trek
- The Physics of Superheroes
- Physics of the Impossible
- The Science of Star Wars
- The Science of Interstellar
- Star Wars: Where Science Meets Imagination
