= The Science of Star Wars (book) =

1999 popular science book by Jeanne Cavelos

- Hardcover edition
- Author: Jeanne Cavelos
- Language: English
- Subject: Popular science, Star Wars
- Genre: Non-fiction
- Published: April 15th 1999 (hardcover)
- Publisher: St. Martin's Press
- Publication place: United States
- Media type: Print, e-book, audio cassette
- Pages: 255 pp.
- ISBN: 0312209584

The Science of Star Wars is a nonfiction popular science book written by former NASA astrophysicist Jeanne Cavelos first published on April 15, 1999, by St. Martin's Press. The book uses fictional characters, worlds, and technology from the Star Wars universe as starting points for discussion of factual concepts in cosmology, biology, and technology, and discusses in a "semi-serious" fashion the scientific probability of such fictional elements. "It takes the fantastic elements of the movies—like faster-than-light travel—and examines the current state of science to see if they're possible".

== Summary ==
Chapter 1: Planetary Environments covers topics such as cosmology, planetary science, desert ecosystems, and the biochemical requirements for the origin of life, using fictional Star Wars locales such as Tatooine and Endor as starting points for discussion.

Chapter 2: Aliens discusses biological and evolutionary concepts such as bipedal and quadrupedal locomotion, mammalian physiology, bioluminescence, and others, based on fictional creatures such as Wookiees, Jawas, Ewoks, and Hutts (the race to which Jabba belongs).

Chapter 3: Droids explores topics such as artificial intelligence, neuroscience, human psychology using robotic droids such as C-3PO and R2-D2 as prompts.

Chapter 4: Spaceships and Weapons covers advances in quantum physics, string theory, anti-gravity, and laser technology, stemming from fictional devices such as lightsabers, and the Death Star.

Chapter 5: The Force discusses the plausibility of Jedi powers and "the Force" by exploring quantum physical concepts of tachyons and superstring theory as well as various fringe and the parascientific concept of parapsychology.

== Reception ==
The book received generally positive reception for covering complex theories and concepts in a manner comprehensible and entertaining to non-specialists. Charles Kolb of the National Endowment for the Humanities writes that Cavelos "has given us a good story and has transported the reader from science fiction to science fact and probability... There is a great deal of scientific material presented in an upbeat, non-trivialized, well-written and engaging style." However, Kolb found Cavelos' lack of direct citations to publications and expert interviews "particularly distressing" for readers wishing to verify in-line quotations or easily locate additional sources. Frederick Pratter's review in The Christian Science Monitor largely echoed Kolb's praise, stating "the scientific research presented is the mainstream of current thinking in astrophysics, cosmology, robotics, genetics, and biological adaptation. The style, as might be expected, is light and breezy, but rarely trivializes the material".

== See also ==
- List of non-fiction Star Wars books
- Star Wars: Science Adventures
- The Science of Interstellar
- The Physics of Star Trek
- Beyond Star Trek
- Star Wars: Where Science Meets Imagination (book)
- The Physics of Star Wars
- The Military Science of Star Wars
