= Interstellar (film) =

2014 film by Christopher Nolan

- Theatrical release poster
- Directed by: Christopher Nolan
- Written by: Jonathan Nolan; Christopher Nolan
- Produced by: Emma Thomas; Christopher Nolan; Lynda Obst
- Starring: Matthew McConaughey; Anne Hathaway; Jessica Chastain; Bill Irwin; Ellen Burstyn; Michael Caine
- Cinematography: Hoyte van Hoytema
- Edited by: Lee Smith
- Music by: Hans Zimmer
- Production companies: Legendary Pictures; Syncopy; Lynda Obst Productions
- Distributed by: Paramount Pictures (United States); Warner Bros. Pictures (International)
- Release dates: October 26, 2014 (TCL Chinese Theatre); November 5, 2014 (United States); November 7, 2014 (United Kingdom)
- Running time: 169 minutes
- Countries: United States; United Kingdom
- Language: English
- Budget: $165 million
- Box office: $782.7 million (Note: This number culminates the initial $681 million worldwide gross, and subsequent releases that followed.)

Interstellar is a 2014 epic (Note: Attributed to multiple references:) science fiction drama film directed by Christopher Nolan, who co-wrote the screenplay with his brother, Jonathan Nolan. It features an ensemble cast led by Matthew McConaughey, Anne Hathaway, Jessica Chastain, Bill Irwin, Ellen Burstyn, and Michael Caine. Set in a dystopian future where Earth is suffering from catastrophic blight and famine, the film follows a group of astronauts who travel through space in search of a new home for humanity.

The film began development in 2006 from a treatment by producer Lynda Obst and theoretical physicist Kip Thorne, and was originally set to be directed by Steven Spielberg. Thorne served as an executive producer and scientific consultant on the film, and wrote the tie-in book The Science of Interstellar. It was Obst's final film as producer before her death. Cinematographer Hoyte van Hoytema shot it on 35 mm film in the Panavision anamorphic format and IMAX 70 mm. It was filmed, beginning in late 2013, in Alberta (Canada), Kirkjubæjarklaustur (a village in Iceland), and Los Angeles. Interstellar uses extensive practical and miniature effects, and the company DNEG created additional visual effects.

Interstellar premiered at the TCL Chinese Theatre, Los Angeles, on October 26, 2014, and was released in theaters in the United States on November 5, and in the United Kingdom on November 7, with Paramount Pictures distributing in the United States and Warner Bros. Pictures distributing in international markets. In the United States, it was first released on film stock, expanding to venues using digital projectors. It was a commercial success, grossing $681.1 million worldwide during its initial theatrical run, and $782.7 million worldwide with subsequent releases, making it the 10th-highest-grossing film of 2014. The film received generally positive reviews from critics. Among its various accolades, Interstellar was nominated for five awards at the 87th Academy Awards, winning for Best Visual Effects.

== Plot ==
In the near future, humanity faces extinction due to dust storms and widespread crop blights. Joseph Cooper, a widowed former NASA test pilot, works as a farmer and raises his children, Murphy "Murph" and Tom, with his father-in-law Donald. Following a dust storm, Cooper and Murph discover that dust patterns in Murph's room, which she had attributed to a ghost, result from a gravitational anomaly. Cooper recognizes the patterns as binary code specifying coordinates, which lead him and Murph to a secret NASA facility headed by Professor John Brand.

Brand explains that 48 years earlier, a wormhole appeared near Saturn, apparently placed there by an unknown intelligence, leading to a system in another galaxy with 12 potentially habitable planets located near a black hole named Gargantua. Volunteers of the Lazarus expedition had previously traveled through the wormhole to evaluate the planets, with three—Miller, Mann, and Edmunds—reporting back desirable results.

Cooper is enlisted to pilot the Endurance spacecraft through the wormhole as part of a mission to colonize a habitable planet with 5,000 frozen embryos and ensure humanity's survival. Meanwhile, Professor Brand would continue his work on solving a gravity equation, the solution of which would enable construction of a spacecraft for an exodus from Earth. Cooper accepts against Murph's wishes and promises to return. When she refuses to see him off, he leaves her his wristwatch to compare their relative time when he returns.

The crew, consisting of Cooper, robots TARS and CASE, and scientists Amelia Brand (Professor Brand's daughter), Romilly, and Doyle, traverses the wormhole after a two-year voyage to Saturn. Cooper, Doyle, and Brand use a lander to investigate Miller's planet, where time is severely dilated. They land in knee-high water and find only wreckage from Miller's expedition before a gigantic tidal wave kills Doyle and waterlogs the lander's engines.

By the time they leave the planet, Cooper and Brand discover that 23 years have elapsed on the Endurance. Having enough fuel left for only one of the remaining planets, Cooper and Romilly decide to go to Mann's planet, despite Brand's protests, as he is still broadcasting. En route, they receive messages from Earth. Cooper watches Tom grow up, marry, and have his first son, who soon passes away, while an adult Murph is now a scientist working on the gravity equation with Professor Brand. On his deathbed, Professor Brand confesses to Murph that the Endurance crew was never meant to return, since a complete solution to the equation was impossible to obtain without measurements from inside a black hole.

On Mann's planet, they awaken him from cryostasis, and he assures them that colonization is possible, despite the extreme environment. During a scouting mission, Mann attempts to kill Cooper and reveals that he falsified his data in the hope of being rescued. He steals Cooper's lander and heads for the Endurance. A booby trap set by Mann kills Romilly, but Brand rescues Cooper with the other lander and they race back to the Endurance. Mann is killed in a failed manual docking operation, badly damaging the Endurance, but Cooper is able to regain control of the spacecraft through his own docking maneuver.

With insufficient fuel, Cooper and Brand resort to a slingshot around Gargantua, which costs them 51 years due to time dilation. In the process, Cooper and TARS detach in their craft to lighten the Endurance so that Brand and CASE may reach Edmunds' planet. Falling past Gargantua's event horizon, they eject from their craft and find themselves in a tesseract made up of infinite copies of Murph's bedroom across moments in time. Cooper deduces that the tesseract was constructed by advanced humans in the far future, and realizes that he had always been Murph's "ghost". Using Morse code, he manipulates the second hand of her wristwatch to transmit the data TARS collected, enabling Murph to complete the gravity equation's solution.

The tesseract, its purpose fulfilled, collapses, ejecting Cooper and TARS. Cooper wakes up on a station orbiting Saturn. He reunites with Murph, now elderly and on her deathbed, who tells him to seek out Brand. Cooper and TARS take a spacecraft to rejoin Brand and CASE, who are establishing the human colony on Edmunds' planet.

== Cast ==
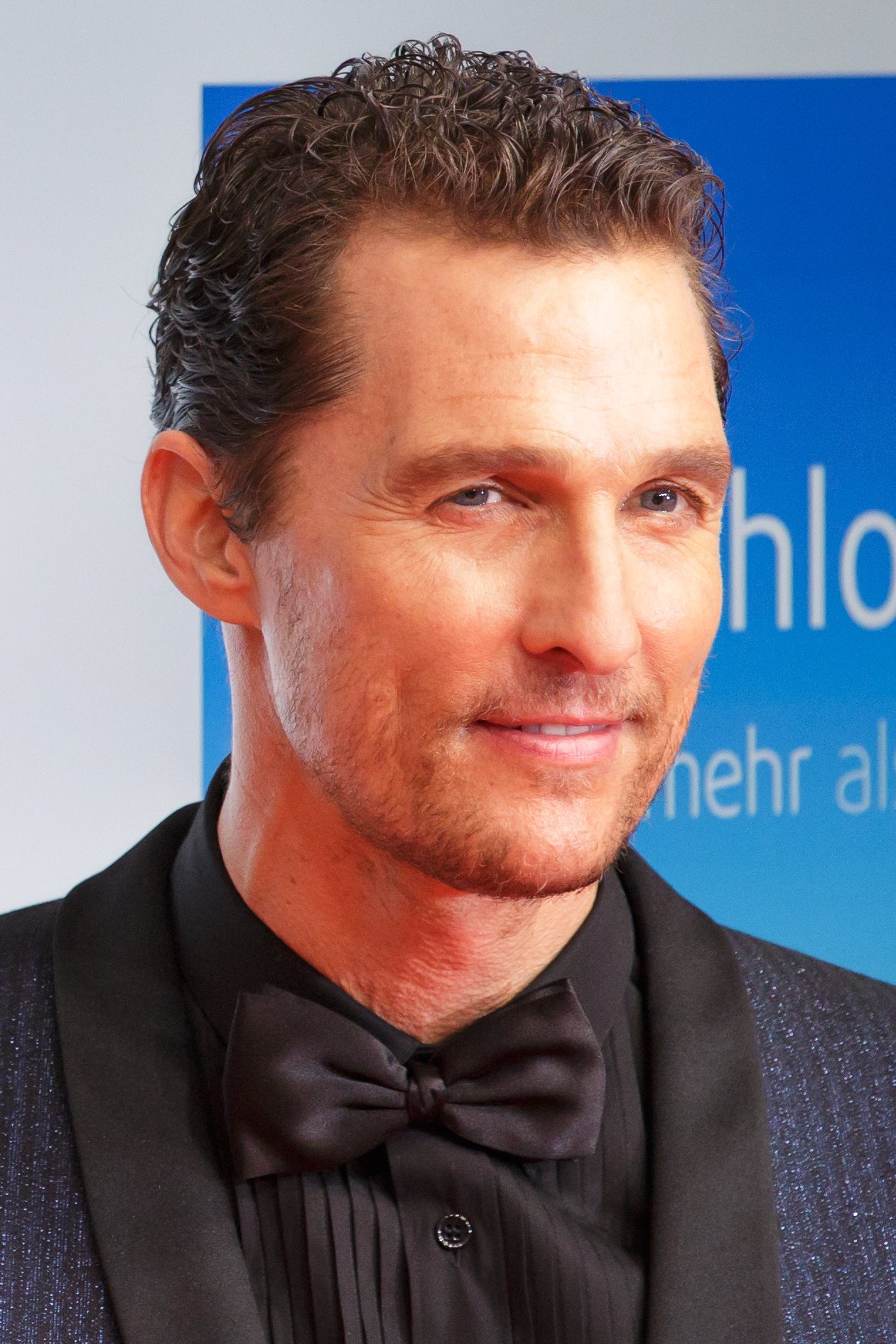
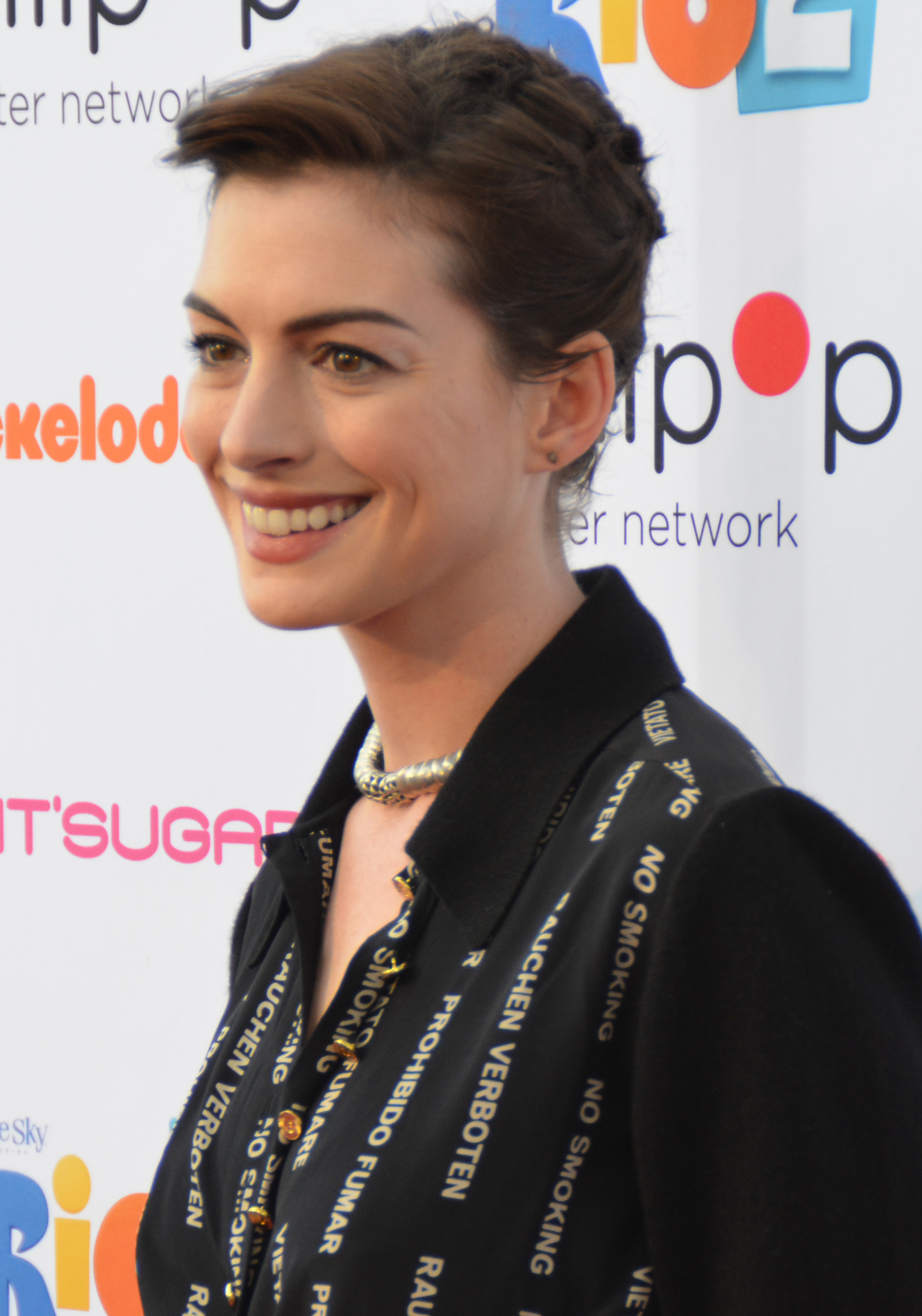
Matthew McConaughey and Anne Hathaway (both pictured in 2014) played the protagonists of Interstellar.
- Matthew McConaughey as Joseph "Coop" Cooper, a widowed NASA pilot who reluctantly becomes a farmer after the agency is closed by the government, and eventually joins the Endurance mission as the lead pilot.
- Anne Hathaway as Dr. Amelia Brand, Professor Brand's daughter and NASA scientist aboard the Endurance mission, is responsible for conducting planet colonization.
- Jessica Chastain as Murphy "Murph" Cooper, Joseph's daughter, eventually becomes a NASA scientist working under Professor Brand.
  - Ellen Burstyn as elderly Murph
  - Mackenzie Foy as 10-year-old Murph
- John Lithgow as Donald, Cooper's father-in-law
- Michael Caine as Professor John Brand, a high-ranking NASA scientist, father of Amelia, former mentor of Cooper, and director of the Lazarus and Endurance missions
- Casey Affleck as Tom Cooper, Joseph's son, who eventually takes charge of his father's farm
  - Timothée Chalamet as 15-year-old Tom
- Wes Bentley as Doyle, a high-ranking NASA member, and Endurance crew member
- Bill Irwin as TARS (voice and puppetry) and CASE (puppetry), robots assigned to assist the crew of the Endurance
- Topher Grace as Getty, Murph's colleague and love interest
- David Gyasi as Professor Romilly, a high-ranking NASA member, and Endurance crew member
- Matt Damon as Dr. Mann, a NASA astronaut sent to an icy planet during the Lazarus program

Also appearing are Josh Stewart as the voice of CASE; Leah Cairns as Lois, Tom's wife; Liam Dickinson as Coop, Tom's son; David Oyelowo and Collette Wolfe, respectively, as school principal and teacher Ms. Hanley; Francis X. McCarthy as farmer "Boots"; William Devane as Williams, another NASA member; Elyes Gabel as Cooper Station administrator; Lennart Nowak as Tom's cousin; and Jeff Hephner as Cooper Station doctor.

== Production ==
=== Development and financing ===
The premise for Interstellar was conceived by the producer Lynda Obst and the theoretical physicist Kip Thorne, who collaborated on the film Contact (1997), and had known each other since Carl Sagan set them up on a blind date. The two conceived a scenario, based on Thorne's work, about "the most exotic events in the universe suddenly becoming accessible to humans", and attracted Steven Spielberg's interest in directing. The film began development in June 2006, when Spielberg and Paramount Pictures announced plans for a science fiction film based on an eight-page treatment written by Obst and Thorne. Obst was attached to produce. By March 2007, Jonathan Nolan was hired to write a screenplay.

After Spielberg moved his production studio, DreamWorks Pictures, from Paramount Pictures to Walt Disney Studios in 2009, Paramount needed a new director for Interstellar. Jonathan Nolan recommended his brother Christopher, who joined the project in 2012. Spielberg later admitted that Christopher Nolan had become interested in the project after Jonathan had started to work on it and was told by the latter that Nolan would probably direct it instead if Spielberg were to step away. Christopher Nolan met with Thorne, then attached as executive producer, to discuss the use of spacetime in the story. In January 2013, Paramount and Warner Bros. announced that Christopher Nolan was in negotiations to direct Interstellar. Nolan said he wanted to encourage the goal of human spaceflight, and intended to merge his brother's screenplay with his own. By the following March, Nolan was confirmed to direct Interstellar, which would be produced under his label Syncopy and Lynda Obst Productions. The Hollywood Reporter said Nolan would earn a salary of $20 million against 20% of the total gross. To research for the film, Nolan visited NASA and the private space program at SpaceX.

Warner Bros. sought a stake in Nolan's production of Interstellar from Paramount, despite their traditional rivalry, and agreed to give Paramount its rights to co-finance the next film in the Friday the 13th horror franchise, with a stake in a future film based on the television series South Park, the second after South Park: Bigger, Longer & Uncut (1999). Warner Bros. also agreed to let Paramount co-finance an indeterminate "A-list" property. In August 2013, Legendary Pictures finalized an agreement with Warner Bros. to finance approximately 25% of the film's production. Although it failed to renew its eight-year production partnership with Warner Bros., Legendary reportedly agreed to forgo financing Batman v Superman: Dawn of Justice (2016) in exchange for the stake in Interstellar.

=== Writing and casting ===
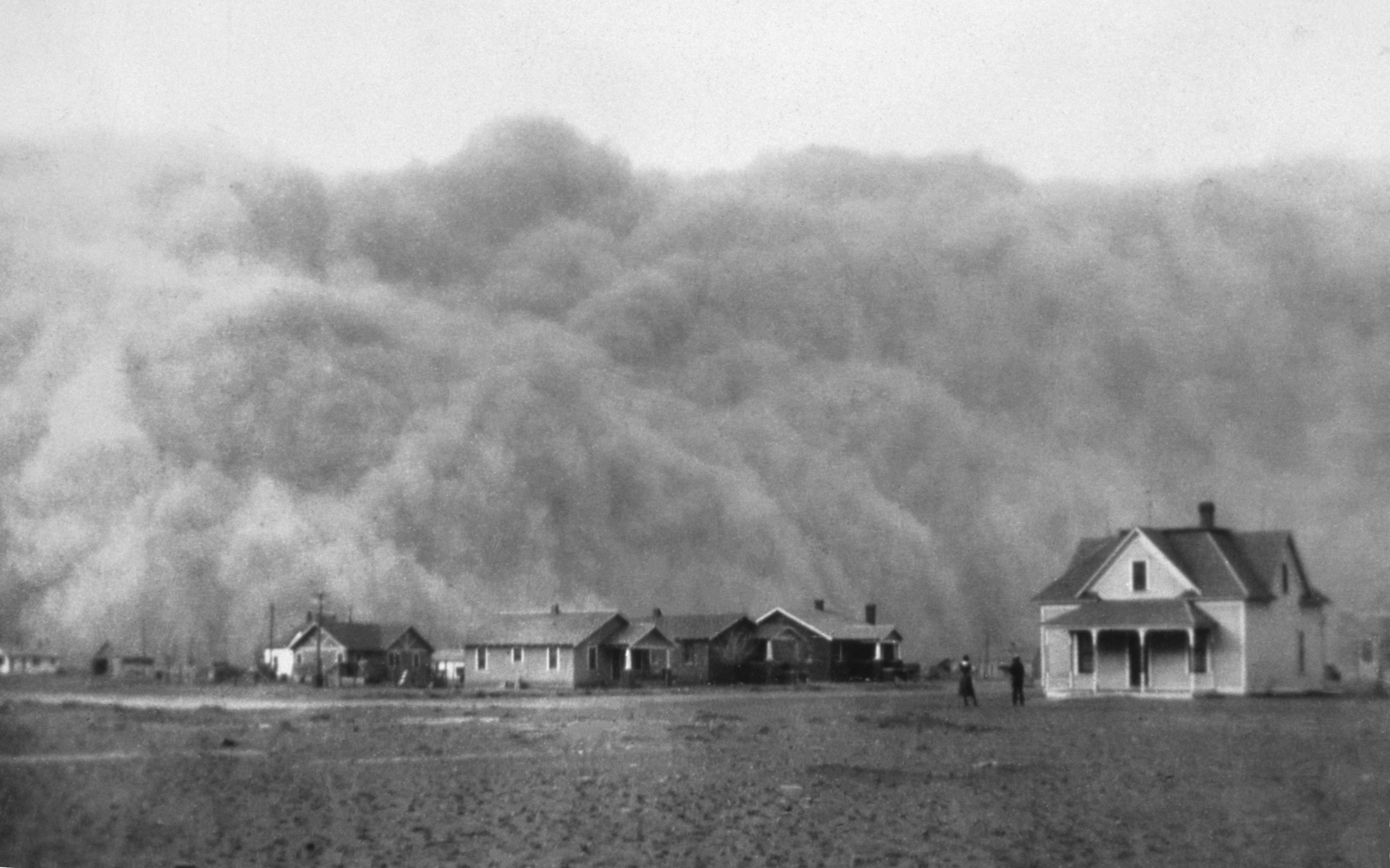
The Dust Bowl phenomenon of the 1930s, as documented by Ken Burns in The Dust Bowl (2012), served as inspiration for the blight.

Jonathan Nolan worked on the script for four years. To learn the scientific aspects, he studied relativity at the California Institute of Technology. He was pessimistic about the Space Shuttle program ending and how NASA lacked financing for a human mission to Mars, drawing inspiration from science-fiction films with apocalyptic themes, such as WALL-E (2008) and Avatar (2009). Jeff Jensen of Entertainment Weekly said: "He set the story in a dystopian future ravaged by blight, but populated with hardy folk who refuse to bow to despair."

His brother Christopher had worked on other science fiction scripts but decided to take the Interstellar script and choose among the vast array of ideas presented by Jonathan and Thorne. He picked what he felt, as director, he could get "across to the audience and hopefully not lose them", before he merged it with a script he had worked on for years on his own. Among the elements from the original script that Christopher removed was how gravitational waves were used for detecting the wormhole—and then regretted it after LIGO detected gravitational waves just little over a year later. He kept in place Jonathan's conception of the first hour, which is set on a resource-depleted Earth in the near future. The setting was inspired by the Dust Bowl that took place in the United States during the Great Depression in the 1930s. He revised the rest of the script, where a team travels into space, instead. After watching the 2012 documentary The Dust Bowl for inspiration, Christopher contacted the director, Ken Burns, and the producer, Dayton Duncan. They granted him permission to use some of their featured interviews in Interstellar.

Christopher Nolan wanted an actor who could bring to life his vision of the main character as an everyman with whom "the audience could experience the story". He became interested in casting Matthew McConaughey after watching him in an early cut of the 2012 film Mud, which he had seen as a friend of one of its producers, Aaron Ryder. Nolan went to visit McConaughey while he was filming for the television series True Detective. Anne Hathaway was invited to Nolan's home, where she read the script for Interstellar. In early 2013, both actors were cast in the starring roles. Jessica Chastain was contacted while she was working on Miss Julie (2014) in Northern Ireland, and a script was delivered to her. Irrfan Khan was offered a role, but rejected it due to scheduling conflicts. Matt Damon was cast as Dr. Mann in late August 2013 and completed filming his scenes in Iceland.

=== Principal photography ===
Nolan shot Interstellar on 35 mm film in the Panavision anamorphic format and IMAX 70 mm photography. Cinematographer Hoyte van Hoytema was hired for Interstellar, as Wally Pfister, Nolan's cinematographer on all of his previous films, was making his directorial debut with Transcendence (2014); Pfister would later retire as a cinematographer for films. More IMAX cameras were used for Interstellar than for any of Nolan's previous films. To minimize the use of computer-generated imagery (CGI), Nolan had practical locations built, such as the interior of a space shuttle. Van Hoytema retooled an IMAX camera to be hand-held for shooting interior scenes. Some of the film's sequences were shot with an IMAX camera installed in the nose cone of a Learjet. Nolan, who is known for keeping details of his productions secret, strove to ensure secrecy for Interstellar. Writing for The Wall Street Journal, Ben Fritz stated, "The famously secretive filmmaker has gone to extreme lengths to guard the script to ... Interstellar, just as he did with the blockbuster Dark Knight trilogy." As one security measure, Interstellar was filmed under the name Flora's Letter, Flora being one of Nolan's four children with producer Emma Thomas.

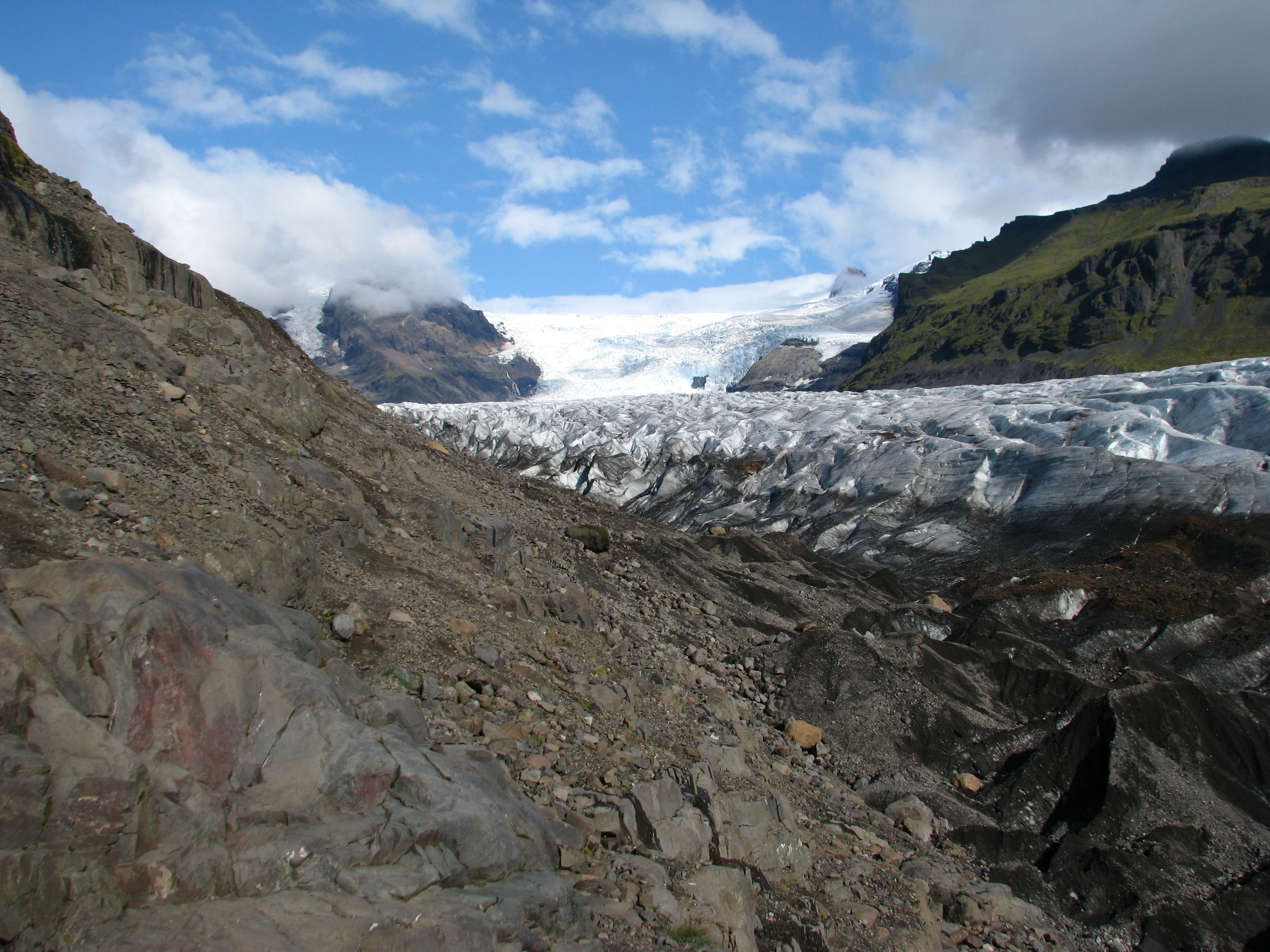
The Svínafellsjökull glacier in Iceland was used as a filming location for Interstellar, doubling for Mann's planet.

The film's principal photography was scheduled to last four months. It began on August 6, 2013, in the province of Alberta, Canada. Towns in Alberta where shooting took place included Nanton, Longview, Lethbridge, Fort Macleod, and Okotoks. In Okotoks, filming took place at the Seaman Stadium and the Olde Town Plaza. For a cornfield scene, production designer Nathan Crowley planted 500 acres (200 ha) of corn that would be destroyed in an apocalyptic dust storm scene, intended to be similar to storms experienced during the Dust Bowl in 1930s America. Additional scenes involving the dust storm and McConaughey's character were also shot in Fort Macleod, where the giant dust clouds were created on location using large fans to blow cellulose-based synthetic dust through the air. Filming in the province lasted until September 9, 2013 and involved hundreds of extras in addition to 130 crew members, most of whom were local.

Shooting also took place in Iceland, where Nolan had previously filmed scenes for Batman Begins (2005). It was chosen to represent two extraterrestrial planets: one covered in ice, and the other in water. The crew transported mock spaceships weighing about 10,000 pounds (4,500 kg). They spent two weeks shooting there, during which a crew of about 350 people, including 130 locals, worked on the film. Locations included Svínafellsjökull (a small glacier at the southern edge of Vatnajökull) and the village of Kirkjubæjarklaustur. Safety concerns led to the cancellation of a filming day on Svínafellsjökull; as a result, close-ups of Cooper and Mann's fight scene were filmed in a motel parking lot which was painted to resemble the glacier. While filming a water scene in Iceland, Hathaway almost suffered from hypothermia because her dry suit had not been properly secured.

After the schedule in Iceland was completed, the crew shot in Los Angeles for 54 days. Filming locations included the Westin Bonaventure Hotel and Suites, the Los Angeles Convention Center, a Sony Pictures soundstage in Culver City, and a private residence in Altadena, California. Principal photography concluded in December 2013. Production had a budget of $165 million, $10 million less than was allotted by Paramount, Warner Bros., and Legendary Pictures.

=== Production design ===
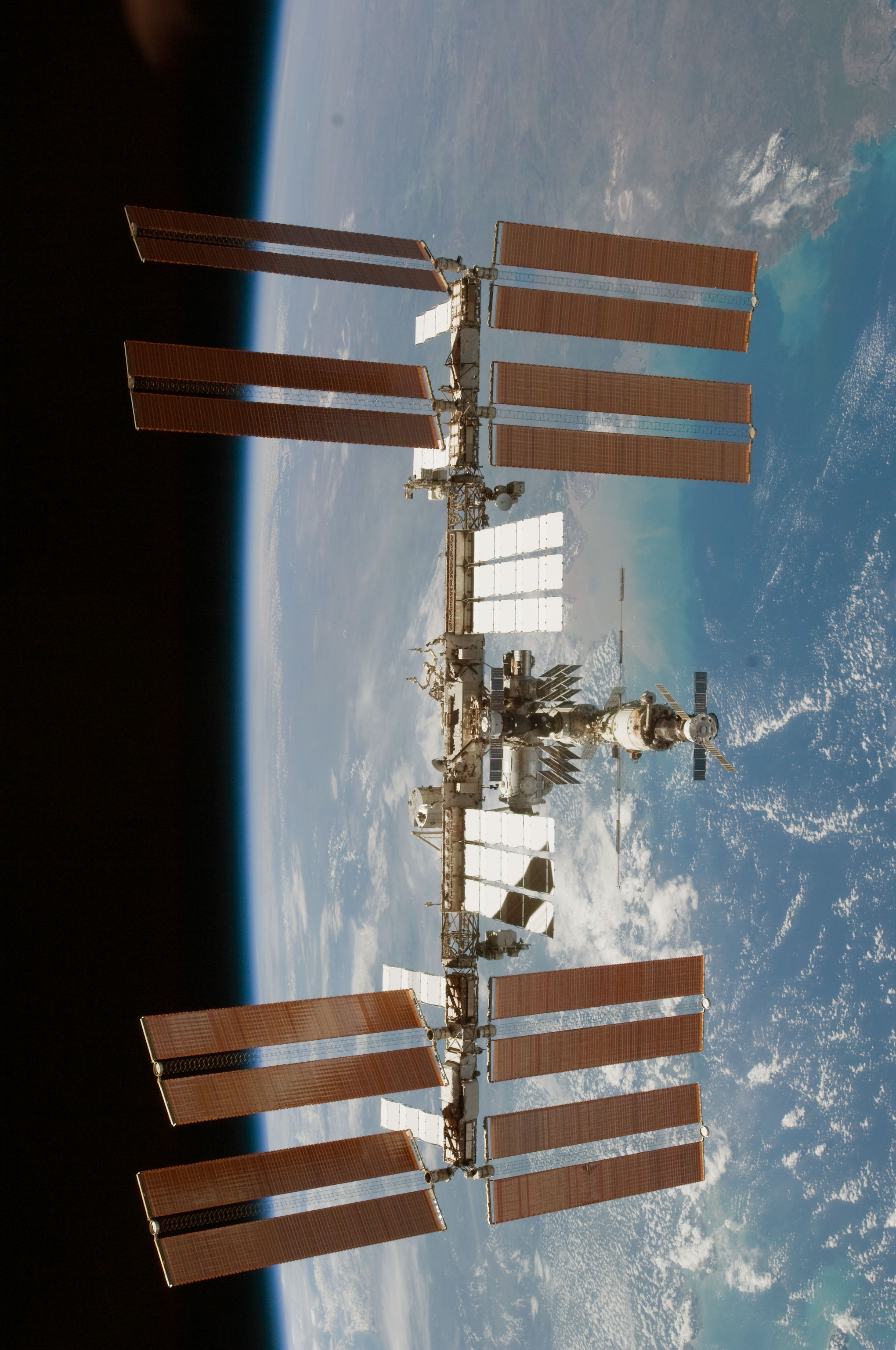
The Endurance spacecraft (left) is based on the International Space Station (right).

Interstellar features three spacecraft—the Endurance, a ranger, and a lander. The Endurance, the crew's mother ship, is a circular structure consisting of 12 capsules, laid flat to mimic a clock: Four capsules with planetary settling equipment, four with engines, and four with the permanent functions of cockpit, medical labs, and habitation. Production designer Nathan Crowley said the Endurance was based on the International Space Station: "It's a real mish-mash of different kinds of technology. You need analogue stuff, as well as digital stuff, you need backup systems and tangible switches. It's really like a submarine in space. Every inch of space is used, everything has a purpose." The ranger's function is similar to the Space Shuttle's, being able to enter and exit planetary atmospheres. Lastly, the lander transports the capsules with settling equipment to planetary surfaces. Crowley compared it to "a heavy Russian helicopter."

The film features two robots, CASE and TARS, as well as a dismantled third robot, KIPP. Nolan wanted to avoid making the robots anthropomorphic and chose a 1.5 m (4.9 ft) quadrilateral design. He said: "It has a very complicated design philosophy. It's based on mathematics. You've got four main blocks and they can be joined in three ways. So, you have three combinations you follow. But then within that, it subdivides into a further three joints. And all the places we see lines—those can subdivide further. So you can unfold a finger, essentially, but it's all proportional." Bill Irwin voiced and physically controlled both robots, with his image digitally removed, and Josh Stewart replaced his voicing for CASE. The human space habitats resemble O'Neill cylinders, a theoretical space habitat model proposed by physicist Gerard K. O'Neill in 1976.

=== Sound design ===
Gregg Landaker and Gary A. Rizzo were the film's audio engineers tasked with audio mixing, while sound designer Richard King supervised the process. Christopher Nolan sought to mix the sound to take maximum advantage of theater equipment and paid close attention to designing the sound mix, like focusing on the sound of buttons being pressed with astronaut suit gloves. The studio's website stated that the film was "mixed to maximize the power of the low-end frequencies in the main channels, as well as in the subwoofer channel." Nolan deliberately intended some dialogue to seem drowned out by ambient noise or music, causing some theaters to post notices emphasizing that this effect was intentional and not a fault in their equipment.

=== Music ===
Hans Zimmer, who scored Nolan's The Dark Knight Trilogy and Inception (2010), returned to score Interstellar. Nolan chose not to provide Zimmer with a script or any plot details but instead gave him a single page that told the story of a father leaving his child for work. It was through this connection that Zimmer created the early stages of the Interstellar soundtrack. Zimmer and Nolan later decided the 1926 four-manual Harrison & Harrison organ of the Temple Church, London, would be the primary instrument for the score. Zimmer conducted 45 scoring sessions for Interstellar, three times more than for Inception. The soundtrack was released on November 17, 2014.

=== Visual effects ===
The visual effects company DNEG, which collaborated on Inception, was brought back for Interstellar. According to visual effects supervisor Paul Franklin, the number of effects in the film was not much greater than in Nolan's The Dark Knight Rises (2012) or Inception. However, for Interstellar, they created the effects first, allowing digital projectors to display them behind the actors, rather than having the actors perform in front of green screens. The film contained 850 visual-effect shots at a resolution of 5600 × 4000 lines: 150 shots that were created in-camera using digital projectors, and another 700 were created in post-production. Of those, 620 were presented in IMAX, while the rest were anamorphic.

The ranger, Endurance, and lander spacecraft were created using miniature effects by Nathan Crowley in collaboration with visual effects company New Deal Studios, as opposed to using computer-generated imagery, as Nolan felt they offered the best way to give the ships a tangible presence in space. 3D-printed and hand-sculpted, the scale models earned the nickname "maxatures" by the crew due to their immense size; the 1/15th-scale miniature of the Endurance module spanned over 7.6 m (25 ft), while a pyrotechnic model of part of the craft was built at 1/5th scale. The Ranger and Lander miniatures spanned 14 m (46 ft) and over 15 m (49 ft), respectively, and were large enough for van Hoytema to mount IMAX cameras directly onto the spacecraft, thus mimicking the look of NASA IMAX documentaries. The models were then attached to a six-axis gimbal on a motion control system that allowed an operator to manipulate their movements, which were filmed against background plates of space using VistaVision cameras on a smaller motion control rig. New Deal Studio's miniatures were used in 150 special effects shots.

=== Themes and influences ===
Nolan was influenced by what he called "key touchstones" of science fiction cinema, including Metropolis (1927), 2001: A Space Odyssey (1968), Blade Runner (1982), Star Wars (1977), and Alien (1979). Andrei Tarkovsky's Mirror (1975) influenced "elemental things in the story to do with wind and dust and water", according to Nolan, who also compared Interstellar to The Treasure of the Sierra Madre (1948) as a film about human nature. He sought to emulate films like Steven Spielberg's Jaws (1975) and Close Encounters of the Third Kind (1977) for being family-friendly but also "as edgy and incisive and challenging as anything else on the blockbuster spectrum". He screened The Right Stuff (1983) for the crew before production, following in its example by capturing reflections on the Interstellar astronauts' visors. For further inspiration, Nolan invited former astronaut Marsha Ivins to the set. Nolan and his crew studied the IMAX NASA documentaries of filmmaker Toni Myers for visual reference of spacefaring missions, and strove to imitate their use of IMAX cameras in the enclosed spaces of spacecraft interiors. Clark Kent's upbringing in Man of Steel (2013) was the inspiration for the farm setting in the Midwest. Apart from the films, Nolan drew inspiration from the architecture of Ludwig Mies van der Rohe.

== Scientific accuracy ==
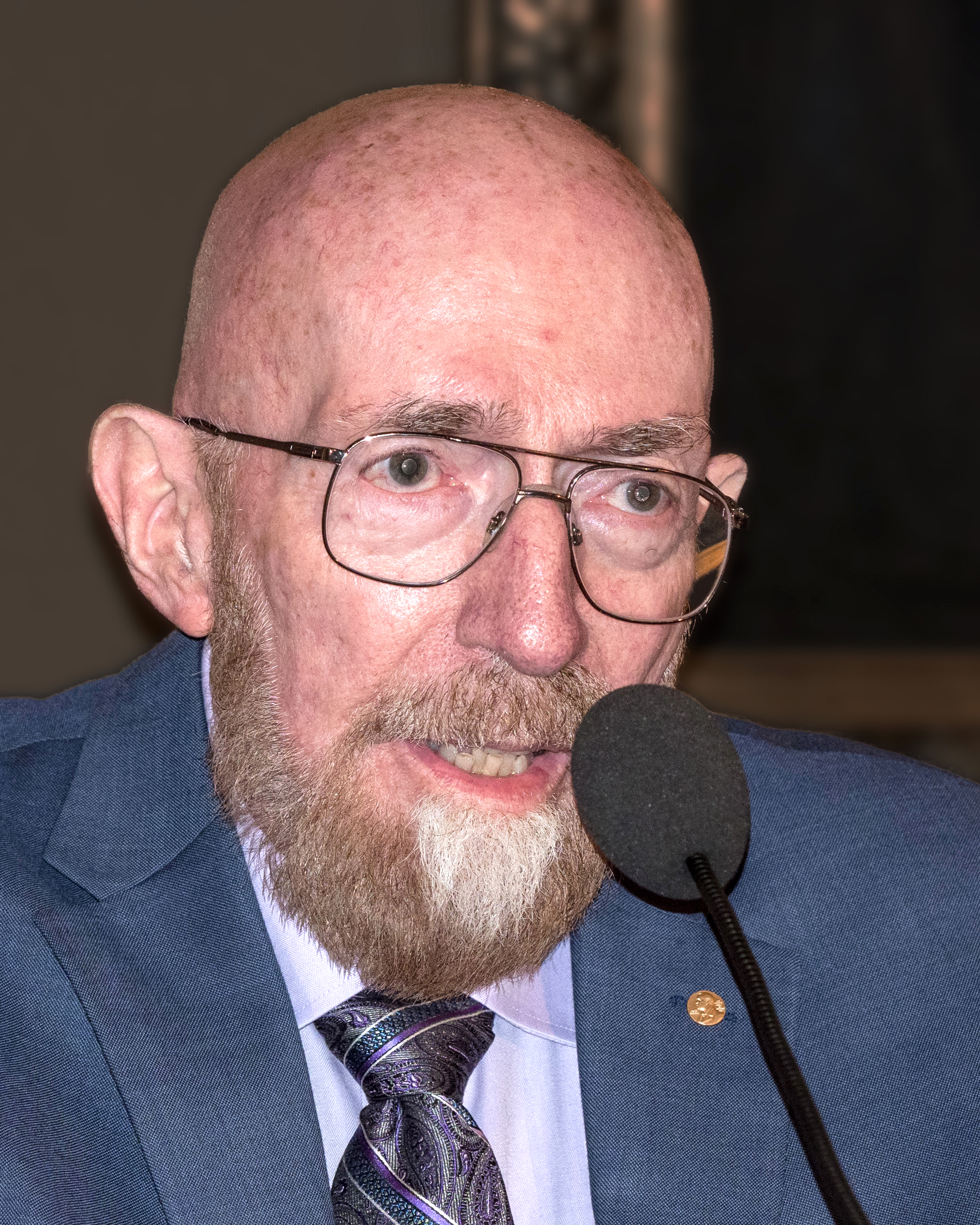
Kip Thorne, theoretical physicist and Nobel Laureate, conceived and executive produced the film and served as scientific consultant.

Regarding the concepts of wormholes and black holes, Kip Thorne, said he "worked on the equations that would enable tracing of light rays as they traveled through a wormhole or around a black hole—so what you see is based on Einstein's general relativity equations". Early in the process, Thorne laid down two guidelines: "First, that nothing would violate established physical laws. Second, that all the wild speculations ... would spring from science and not from the fertile mind of a screenwriter." Nolan accepted these terms as long as they did not interfere with making the film. At one point, Thorne spent two weeks arguing Nolan out of having a character traveling faster than light before Nolan finally gave up. According to Thorne, the element that has the highest degree of artistic freedom is the clouds of ice on one of the planets they visit, which are structures that would go beyond the material strength that ice could support.

The astrobiologist David Grinspoon criticized the dire "blight" situation on Earth portrayed in the early scenes, pointing out that even with a voracious blight it would have taken millions of years to reduce the atmosphere's oxygen content. He also notes that gravity should have pulled down the ice clouds. Neil deGrasse Tyson, an astrophysicist, explored the science behind the ending of Interstellar, concluding that it is theoretically possible to interact with the past, and that "we don't really know what's in a black hole, so take it and run with it". The theoretical physicist Michio Kaku praised the film for its scientific accuracy and said Interstellar "could set the gold standard for science fiction movies for years to come". Timothy Reyes, a former NASA software engineer, said: "Thorne's and Nolan's accounting of black holes and wormholes and the use of gravity is excellent". Physicist Jean-Pierre Luminet, the creator of the first simulated image of a black hole, praised the warped appearance of the accretion disk but criticized the depiction of the interior of the wormhole and noted that several effects were ultimately excluded from the black hole's rendering.

=== Wormholes and black holes ===
Miller's planet orbiting Gargantua

To create the visual effects for the wormhole and a rotating, supermassive black hole (possessing an ergosphere, as opposed to a non-rotating black hole), Thorne collaborated with Franklin and a team of 30 people at Double Negative, providing pages of deeply sourced theoretical equations to the engineers, who then wrote new CGI rendering software based on these equations to create accurate simulations of the gravitational lensing caused by these phenomena. Some individual frames took up to 100 hours to render, totaling 800 terabytes of data. Thorne described the accretion disk of the black hole as "anemic and at low temperature—about the temperature of the surface of the sun," allowing it to emit appreciable light, but not enough gamma radiation and X-rays to threaten nearby astronauts and planets. The resulting visual effects provided Thorne with new insight into the gravitational lensing and accretion disks surrounding black holes, resulting in the publication of three scientific papers.

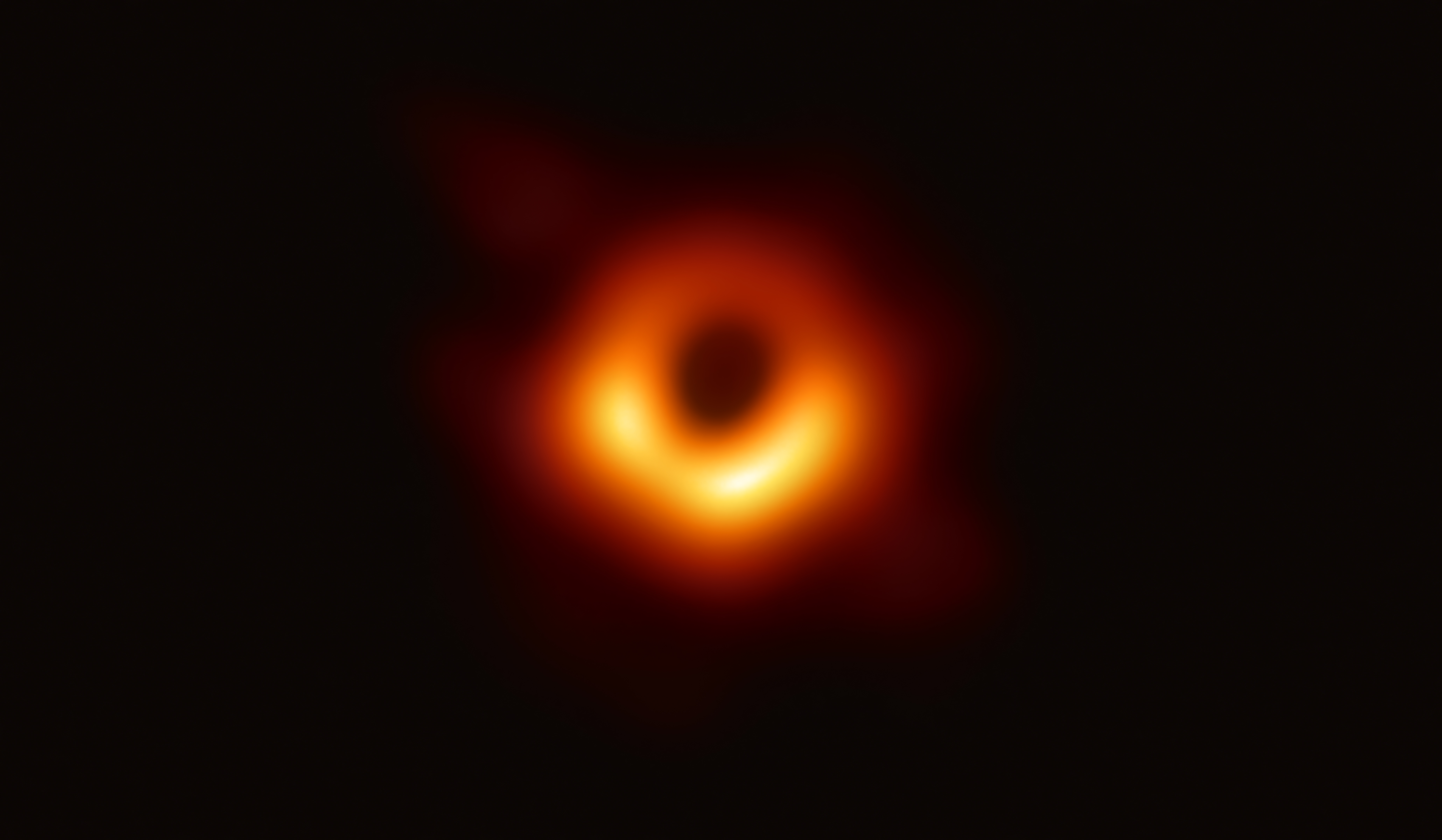
The first image of the event horizon of a black hole, obtained by the Event Horizon Telescope in 2019. The asymmetric brightness of the accretion disk is well visible here.

Nolan was initially concerned that a scientifically accurate depiction of a black hole would not be visually comprehensible to an audience, and would require the effects team to unrealistically alter its appearance. The visual representation of the black hole in the film does not account for the Doppler effect which, when added by the visual effects team, resulted in an asymmetrically lit black and blue-black hole, the purpose of which Nolan thought the audience would not understand. As a result, it was omitted in the finished product. Nolan found the finished effect to be understandable, as long as he maintained consistent camera perspectives.

As a reference, the asymmetric brightness of the accretion disk is very well visible in the first image of the event horizon of a black hole obtained by the Event Horizon Telescope team in 2019. Futura-Sciences praised the correct depiction of the Penrose process. According to Space.com, the portrayal of what a wormhole would look like is scientifically correct. Rather than a two-dimensional hole in space, it is depicted as a sphere, showing a distorted view of the target galaxy.

== Marketing ==
The teaser trailer for Interstellar debuted December 13, 2013, and featured clips related to space exploration, accompanied by a voiceover by Matthew McConaughey's character, Cooper. The theatrical trailer debuted May 5, 2014, at the Lockheed Martin IMAX Theater in Washington, D.C., and was made available online later that month. For the week ending on May 19, it was the most-viewed film trailer, with over 19.5 million views on YouTube. Christopher Nolan and McConaughey made their first appearances at San Diego Comic-Con in July 2014 to promote Interstellar. That same month, Paramount Pictures launched an interactive website, on which users uncovered a star chart related to the Apollo 11 Moon landing.

In October 2014, Paramount partnered with Google to promote Interstellar across multiple platforms. The film's website was relaunched as a digital hub hosted on a Google domain, which collected feedback from film audiences, and linked to a mobile app. It featured a game in which players could build Solar System models and use a flight simulator for space travel. The Paramount–Google partnership also included a virtual time capsule compiled with user-generated content, made available in 2015. The initiative Google for Education used the film as a basis for promoting math and science lesson plans in schools.

Paramount provided a virtual reality walkthrough of the Endurance spacecraft using Oculus Rift technology. It hosted the walkthrough sequentially in New York City, Houston, Los Angeles, and Washington, D.C., from October 6 through November 19, 2014. The publisher Running Press released Interstellar: Beyond Time and Space, a book by Mark Cotta Vaz about the making of the film, on November 11. W. W. Norton & Company released The Science of Interstellar, a book by Thorne; Titan Books released the official novelization, written by Greg Keyes; and Wired magazine released a tie-in online comic, Absolute Zero, written by Christopher Nolan and drawn by Sean Gordon Murphy. The comic is a prequel to the film, with Mann as the protagonist.

== Release ==
=== Theatrical ===
Before Interstellar's public release, Paramount CEO Brad Grey hosted a private screening on October 19, 2014, at the AMC Lincoln Square IMAX theater in Manhattan, New York. Paramount then showed Interstellar to some of the industry's filmmakers and actors in a first-look screening at the California Science Center on October 22. On the following day, the film was screened at the TCL Chinese Theatre in Los Angeles, California for over 900 members of the Screen Actors Guild. The film premiered on October 26 at the TCL Chinese Theatre in Los Angeles, and in Europe on October 29 at the Odeon Leicester Square in London.

Interstellar was released early on November 4 in various 70 mm IMAX film, 70 mm film and 35 mm film theaters, and had a limited release in North America on November 5, with a wide release on November 7. The film was released in Belgium, France, and Switzerland on November 5, the UK on November 7 and in additional territories in the following days. For the limited North American release, Interstellar was projected from 70 mm and 35 mm film in 249 theaters that still supported those formats, including at least forty-one 70 mm IMAX theaters. A 70 mm IMAX projector was installed at the TCL Chinese Theatre in Los Angeles to display the format. The film's wide release expanded to theaters that showed it digitally. Paramount Pictures distributed the film in North America, and Warner Bros. distributed it in the remaining territories. The film was released in over 770 IMAX screens worldwide, which was the largest global release in IMAX theaters, until surpassed by Universal Pictures' Furious 7 (2015) with 810 IMAX theaters.

Interstellar was an exception to Paramount Pictures' goal to stop releasing films on film stock and to distribute them only in digital format. According to Pamela McClintock of The Hollywood Reporter, the initiative to project Interstellar on film stock would help preserve an endangered format, which was supported by Christopher Nolan, J. J. Abrams, Quentin Tarantino, Judd Apatow, Paul Thomas Anderson, and other filmmakers. McClintock reported that theatre owners saw this as "backward", as nearly all theatres in the US had been converted to digital projection.

Interstellar was re-released in theaters on December 6, 2024, for its 10th anniversary, showing in 70 mm IMAX and digital formats. At the weekend box office, the re-release grossed $14 million worldwide, boosting the film's total box office figure to $720 million globally. With the re-release, the film also crossed the $200 million box office threshold in the United States, and has gone on to be the highest-grossing IMAX re-release of all time, accumulating $24.4 million at the worldwide box office, as of December 20, 2024.

=== Home media ===
Interstellar was released on home video on March 31, 2015, in both the United Kingdom and the United States. It topped the home video sales chart for a total of two weeks. It was reported that Interstellar was the most pirated film of 2015, with an estimated 46.7 million downloads on BitTorrent. It was released in the Ultra HD Blu-ray format on December 19, 2017.

== Reception ==
=== Box office ===
Interstellar grossed $188 million in the United States and Canada, and $493 million in other countries, for a worldwide total of $681 million on original release, against a production budget of $165 million. Deadline Hollywood calculated the net profit to be $47 million, accounting for production budgets, marketing, talent participations, and other costs, with box office grosses, and ancillary revenues from home media, placing it 20th on their list of 2014's "Most Valuable Blockbusters". It sold an estimated 22 million tickets domestically.

The film set an IMAX opening record worldwide with $20.5 million from 574 IMAX theaters, surpassing the $17 million record held by The Hunger Games: Catching Fire (2013), and is the best opening for an IMAX 2D, non-sequel, and November IMAX release. It had a worldwide opening of $133 million, which was the tenth-largest opening of 2014, and became the tenth-highest-grossing film of 2014. Interstellar is the fourth film to gross over $100 million worldwide from IMAX ticket sales. It was released in the UK, Ireland and Malta on November 6, 2014, and debuted at number one earning £5.5 million ($8.6 million) in its opening weekend, which was lower than the openings of The Dark Knight Rises (£14.4 million), Gravity (£6.2 million), and Inception (£5.9 million). The film was released in 35 markets on the same day, including major markets like Germany, Russia, Australia, and Brazil earning $8.7 million in total. Through Sunday, it earned an opening weekend total of $83 million from 11.1 million admissions from over 14,800 screens in 62 markets. It earned $7.3 million from 206 IMAX screens, at an average of 35,400 viewers per theater. It went to number one in South Korea ($14.4 million), Russia ($8.9 million), and France ($5.3 million). Other strong openings occurred in Germany ($4.6 million), India ($4.3 million), Italy ($3.7 million), Australia ($3.7 million), Spain ($2.7 million), Mexico ($3.1 million), and Brazil ($1.9 million). Interstellar was released in China on November 12 and earned $5.4 million on its opening day on Wednesday, which is Nolan's biggest opening in China after surpassing the $4.61 million opening record of The Dark Knight Rises. It went on to earn $41.7 million in its opening weekend, accounting for 55% of the market share. It is Nolan's biggest opening in China, Warner Bros.' biggest 2D opening, and the studio's third-biggest opening of all time, behind 2014's The Hobbit: The Battle of the Five Armies ($49.5 million) and 2013's Pacific Rim ($45 million).

It topped the box office outside North America for two consecutive weekends before being overtaken by The Hunger Games: Mockingjay – Part 1 (2014) in its third weekend. Just 31 days after its release, the film became the 13th-most-successful film and 3rd-most-successful foreign film in South Korea with 9.1 million admissions trailing only Avatar (13.3 million admissions), and 2013's Frozen (10.3 million admissions). The film closed down its theatrical run in China on December 12, with total revenue of $122.6 million. In total earnings, its largest markets outside North America and China were South Korea ($73.4 million), the UK, Ireland and Malta ($31.3 million), and Russia and the Commonwealth of Independent States (CIS) ($19 million). Interstellar and Big Hero 6 opened the same weekend (November 7–9, 2014) in the US and Canada. Both were forecast to earn between $55 million and $60 million. In North America, the film is the seventh-highest-grossing film to not hit No. 1, with a top rank of No. 2 on its opening weekend. Interstellar had an early limited release in the US and Canada in selected theaters on November 4 at 8:00 pm, coinciding with the 2014 US midterm elections. It topped the box office the following day, earning $1.35 million from 249 theaters (42 of which were IMAX screens); IMAX accounted for 62% of its total gross. Two hundred and forty of those theaters played in 35 mm, 70 mm, and IMAX 70 mm film formats. It earned $3.6 million from late-night shows for a previews total of $4.9 million. The film was widely released on November 7 and topped the box office on its opening day, earning $17 million ahead of Big Hero 6 ($15.8 million). On its opening weekend, the film earned $47.5 million (Note: In total the film earned $2.2 million from the two late-night showings which would bring its opening weekend gross to $49.7 million.) from 3,561 theaters, debuting in second place after a neck-and-neck competition with Disney's Big Hero 6 ($56.2 million). IMAX comprised $13.2 million (28%) of its opening weekend gross, while other premium large-format screens comprised $5.3 million (10.5%) of the gross. In its second weekend, the film fell to No. 3 behind Big Hero 6 and newcomer Dumb and Dumber To (2014), and dropped 39% earning $29 million for a two-weekend total of $98 million. It earned $7.4 million from IMAX theaters from 368 screens in its second weekend. In its third week, the film earned $15 million and remained at No. 3, below newcomer The Hunger Games: Mockingjay – Part 1 and Big Hero 6.

=== Critical response ===
On review aggregator Rotten Tomatoes, 73% of 373 critic reviews are positive, with an average of 7.1/10. The site's critics consensus reads, "Interstellar represents more of the thrilling, thought-provoking, and visually resplendent filmmaking moviegoers have come to expect from writer-director Christopher Nolan, even if its intellectual reach somewhat exceeds its grasp." Metacritic assigned the film a score of 74 out of 100 based on 46 critics, indicating "generally favorable" reviews. Audiences polled by CinemaScore gave it an average grade of "B+" on an A+ to F scale.

Scott Foundas, chief film critic at Variety, said that Interstellar is "as visually and conceptually audacious as anything Nolan has yet done" and considered the film "more personal" than Nolan's previous films. Claudia Puig of USA Today praised the visual spectacle and powerful themes, while criticizing the "dull" dialogue and "tedious patches inside the space vessel". David Stratton of At the Movies rated the film four-and-a-half stars out of five, commending its ambition, effects, and 70 mm IMAX presentation, though criticizing the sound for "being so loud" as to make some of the dialogue "inaudible". Conversely, co-host Margaret Pomeranz rated the film three out of five, as she felt the human drama got lost among the film's scientific concepts. Henry Barnes of The Guardian scored the film three out of five stars, calling it "a glorious spectacle, but a slight drama, with few characters and too-rare flashes of humour". James Berardinelli called Interstellar "an amazing achievement" and "simultaneously a big-budget science fiction endeavor and a very simple tale of love and sacrifice. It is by turns edgy, breathtaking, hopeful, and heartbreaking." He named it the best film of 2014, and the second-best movie of the decade, deeming it a "real science fiction rather than the crowd-pleasing, watered-down version Hollywood typically offers".

"It's been a while since somebody has come out with such a big vision to things ... Even the elements, the fact that dust is everywhere, and they're living in this dust bowl that is just completely enveloping this area of the world. That's almost something you expect from Tarkovsky or Malick, not a science fiction adventure movie.

— Quentin Tarantino on Interstellar.

Oliver Gettell of the Los Angeles Times reported that "film critics largely agree that Interstellar is an entertaining, emotional, and thought-provoking sci-fi saga, even if it can also be clunky and sentimental at times." James Dyer of Empire awarded the film a full five stars, describing it as "brainy, barmy, and beautiful to behold ... a mind-bending opera of space and time with a soul wrapped up in all the science." Dave Calhoun of Time Out London also granted the film a maximum score of five stars, stating that it is "a bold, beautiful cosmic adventure story with a touch of the surreal and the dreamlike". Richard Roeper of Chicago Sun-Times awarded the film a full four stars and wrote, "This is one of the most beautiful films I have ever seen—in terms of its visuals, and its overriding message about the powerful forces of the one thing we all know but can't measure in scientific terms. Love."

Describing Nolan as a "merchant of awe", Tim Robey of The Telegraph thought that Interstellar was "agonisingly" close to a masterpiece, highlighting the conceptual boldness and "deep-digging intelligence" of the film. Todd McCarthy of The Hollywood Reporter wrote, "This grandly conceived and executed epic tries to give equal weight to intimate human emotions and speculation about the cosmos, with mixed results, but is never less than engrossing, and sometimes more than that." In his review for the Associated Press, Jake Coyle praised the film for its "big-screen grandeur", while finding some of the dialogue "clunky". He described it further as "an absurd endeavor" and "one of the most sublime movies of the decade". Scott Mendelson of Forbes listed Interstellar as one of the most disappointing films of 2014, stating that the film "has a lack of flow, loss of momentum following the climax, clumsy sound mixing", and "thin characters" despite seeing the film twice in order to "give it a second chance". He wrote that Interstellar "ends up as a stripped-down and somewhat muted variation on any number of 'go into space to save the world' movies." Matt Zoller Seitz of RogerEbert.com gave the film three-and-a-half out of four stars, saying that despite his usual quibbles regarding Nolan's excessive dialogue and its lack of a sense of composition, "[Interstellar] is still an impressive, at times astonishing movie that overwhelmed me to the point where my usual objections to Nolan's work melted away ... At times, the movie's one-stop-shopping storytelling evokes the tough-tender spirit of a John Ford picture ... a movie that would rather try to be eight or nine things than just one."

New York Times columnist David Brooks concludes that Interstellar explores the relationships among "science and faith and science and the humanities" and "illustrates the real symbiosis between these realms". Mark Steyn commented on the technological future and the focus on the father-daughter relationship. Wai Chee Dimock, in the Los Angeles Review of Books, wrote that Nolan's films are "rotatable at 90, 180, and 360 degrees," and that "although there is considerable magical thinking here, making it almost an anti-cli-fi film, holding out hope that the end of the planet is not the end of everything. It reverses itself, however, when that magic falls short when the poetic license is naked and plain for all to see".

Steven Spielberg praised the film in 2026 and admitted that it "was a much better movie in Chris Nolan’s hands than it would have been in mine." Author George R. R. Martin called it "the most ambitious and challenging science fiction film since Kubrick's 2001." In 2020, Empire magazine ranked it as one of the best films of the 21st century. Lindsey Bahr of the Associated Press wrote in 2024, "During its time, Interstellar was received warmly and an unambiguous success, but it also had its detractors. Its five Oscar nominations and win were all for crafts. And yet in the decade since, Interstellar has become beloved, a true classic." In 2025, it ranked number 89 on The New York Times' list of "The 100 Best Movies of the 21st Century", based on votes from about 500 directors, actors, and others in the film industry.

=== Accolades ===
At the 87th Academy Awards, Interstellar received nominations for Best Original Score, Best Production Design, Best Sound Editing, Best Sound Mixing, and Best Visual Effects.

== See also ==
- Black holes in fiction
- Blanet – Planet orbiting a black hole
- Causal loop – Type of temporal paradox
- Interstellar travel – Hypothetical travel between stars or planetary systems
- List of American films of 2014
- List of British films of 2014
- List of films featuring space stations
- List of time travel works of fiction
- Starship – Spacecraft designed for interstellar travel
- Wormholes in fiction – Depictions of a spatial anomaly
