= Black Holes and Time Warps =

Popular science book by Kip Thorne

Black Holes & Time Warps: Einstein's Outrageous Legacy
- First edition cover
- Author: Kip S. Thorne
- Illustrator: Matthew Zimet
- Cover artist: Jacques Chazaud
- Subject: Physics: general relativity, quantum gravity, black holes
- Genre: Non-fiction
- Published: 1994
- Publisher: W. W. Norton & Company
- Pages: 619 pp.
- ISBN: 0-393-31276-3
- Dewey Decimal: 530.1'1 93-2014
- LC Class: QC6.T526 1993
- Followed by: The Science of Interstellar (2014)

Black Holes & Time Warps: Einstein's Outrageous Legacy is a 1994 popular science book by physicist Kip Thorne. It provides an illustrated overview of the history and development of black hole theory, from its roots in Newtonian mechanics until the early 1990s.

== Overview ==
Over fourteen chapters, Thorne proceeds roughly chronologically, tracing first the crisis in Newtonian physics precipitated by the Michelson–Morley experiment, and the subsequent development of Einstein's theory of special relativity (given mathematical rigor in the form of Minkowski space), and later Einstein's incorporation of gravity into the framework of general relativity. Black holes were quickly recognized as a feasible solution of Einstein's field equations, but were rejected as physically implausible by most physicists. Work by Subrahmanyan Chandrasekhar suggested that collapsing stars beyond a certain mass cannot be supported by degeneracy pressure, but this result was challenged by the more prestigious Arthur Stanley Eddington, and was not fully accepted for several decades. When the reality of objects which possess an event horizon finally achieved broad acceptance, the stage was set for a thorough investigation into the properties of such objects, yielding the surprising result that black holes have no hair—that is, that their properties are entirely determined by their mass, spin rate, and electrical charge.

Proceeding separately from theoretical research into relativity, and with the refinement of radio astronomy, astrophysics began to produce unusual observations of extremely intense radio sources, which were apparently located outside of the Milky Way. In consultation with theoretical physicists, it became apparent that the only sensible explanation for these sources were extremely large black holes residing in the cores of galaxies, producing intense radiation as they fed and, in the case of quasars, blasting out incredibly powerful jets of material in opposite directions, heating the surrounding galactic gas until it glowed in radio frequencies.

Thorne describes the much less mature search for gravitational waves, phenomena predicted to result from supernovae and black hole collisions, but as yet unobserved in 1993 (and, indeed, not directly observed until 2015, a discovery that led to Thorne being awarded a share of the 2017 Nobel Prize in Physics).

In the 1970s came Stephen Hawking's startling prediction of black hole evaporation, powered by quantum fluctuations near the event horizon.

Toward the end of the text, Thorne deals with the much more speculative question of the nature of the core of a black hole; the so-called gravitational singularity predicted by Einstein's field equations. By introducing quantum behavior to curved spacetime, several physicists have suggested that black holes do not possess a true mathematical singularity, but rather a region of chaotic space, in which time does not exist. The behavior of this space and the material which approaches it are not well understood, with a complete marriage of relativity and quantum physics yet to be achieved. In the final chapter, Thorne delves into even more speculative matters relating to black hole physics, including the existence and nature of wormholes and time machines.

The book features a foreword by Stephen Hawking and an introduction by Frederick Seitz. In addition to the main text, the book provides biographical summaries of the major scientists in the text, a chronology of key events in the history of black hole physics, a glossary of technical terms, twenty-three pages of notes, a bibliography, and alphabetical indices of subjects and people referred to in the text.

== Reception ==
Of the book, The New York Times wrote, "the close and sometimes difficult reasoning it embodies is lightened by a deft, anecdotal approach, and by the author's whimsical drawings and diagrams." Kirkus Reviews opined that "the reader has to wade through many, many pages of theory and diagrams—obvious to the expert but too difficult for the lay reader. Thorne in fact is strongest for the novice reader when dealing with the history of the physics community".

== See also ==
Physicists who play a significant role in the text

- Subrahmanyan Chandrasekhar
- Arthur Stanley Eddington
- Albert Einstein
- Stephen Hawking
- Roy Patrick Kerr
- Lev Davidovich Landau
- Hermann Minkowski
- J. Robert Oppenheimer
- Roger Penrose
- Karl Schwarzschild
- Saul Teukolsky
- John Archibald Wheeler
- Yakov Borisovich Zel'dovich
- Fritz Zwicky

Related articles

- Antimatter
- Dark energy
- Dark matter
- Event horizon
- Exotic matter
- Faster-than-light
- Imaginary mass
- Mirror matter
- Negative mass
- White hole

Similar books

- Parallel Worlds by Michio Kaku
- The Elegant Universe by Brian Greene
- The Fabric of the Cosmos by Brian Greene
- The Fabric of Reality by David Deutsch
- The Universe in a Nutshell by Stephen Hawking

Textbooks

- Gravitation by Charles Misner, Kip Thorne, and John A. Wheeler
- General Relativity by Robert Wald
