= C-energy =

Concept used in general relativity

In general relativity, C-energy (short for cylindrical energy) is a quasi-local definition of gravitational energy applicable to space-times with cylindrical symmetry. The concept was introduced by Kip Thorne in 1965 as an attempt to characterize the energy content of infinitely long, cylindrically symmetric systems.

C-energy has been widely used in the analysis of cylindrical gravitational waves, where it provides a useful measure of the gravitational field strength. In standing cylindrical wave solutions, the C-energy may be strictly constant in time (as in Chandrasekhar waves) or constant only on average (as in Einstein–Rosen waves). Although C-energy does not correspond to a globally conserved energy in general relativity, it remains a useful diagnostic tool for studying cylindrically symmetric space-times and gravitational radiation.

== Definition ==
A space-time with cylindrical symmetry about an axis admits two commuting spacelike Killing vector fields, namely

- $\partial_\phi$, whose orbits are closed and represent axial symmetry, and
- $\partial_z$, whose orbits are open and represent translational symmetry along the axis.

The C-energy is defined geometrically in terms of these Killing vectors by

$$C = -\frac{1}{2}\ln \left(\frac{g^{ij}A_{,i}A_{,j}}{|\partial_z|^2}\right),$$

where $g_{ij}$ is the metric tensor and $A=[|\partial_\phi|^2|\partial_z|^2-(\partial_\phi\cdot\partial_z)^2]^{\frac{1}{2}}$ is the area (per unit axial length) of the two-dimensional surface spanned by the Killing vectors $\partial_\phi$ and $\partial_z$.

When the space-time metric is written in the form

$$ds^2=e^{2\nu}[(dt)^2-(d\rho)^2] - e^{-2\mu}(\rho d\varphi)^2 - e^{2\mu} (dz-q d\varphi)^2$$

with $\nu=\nu(t,\rho)$, $\mu=\mu(t,\rho)$ and $q=q(t,\rho)$, the C-energy reduces to the simple form

$$C=\nu+\mu.$$

In Chandrasekhar waves, for which $q \neq 0$, the C-energy is constant in time, whereas in Einstein–Rosen waves, where $q = 0$, the C-energy varies periodically with time.
