= Sándor J. Kovács =

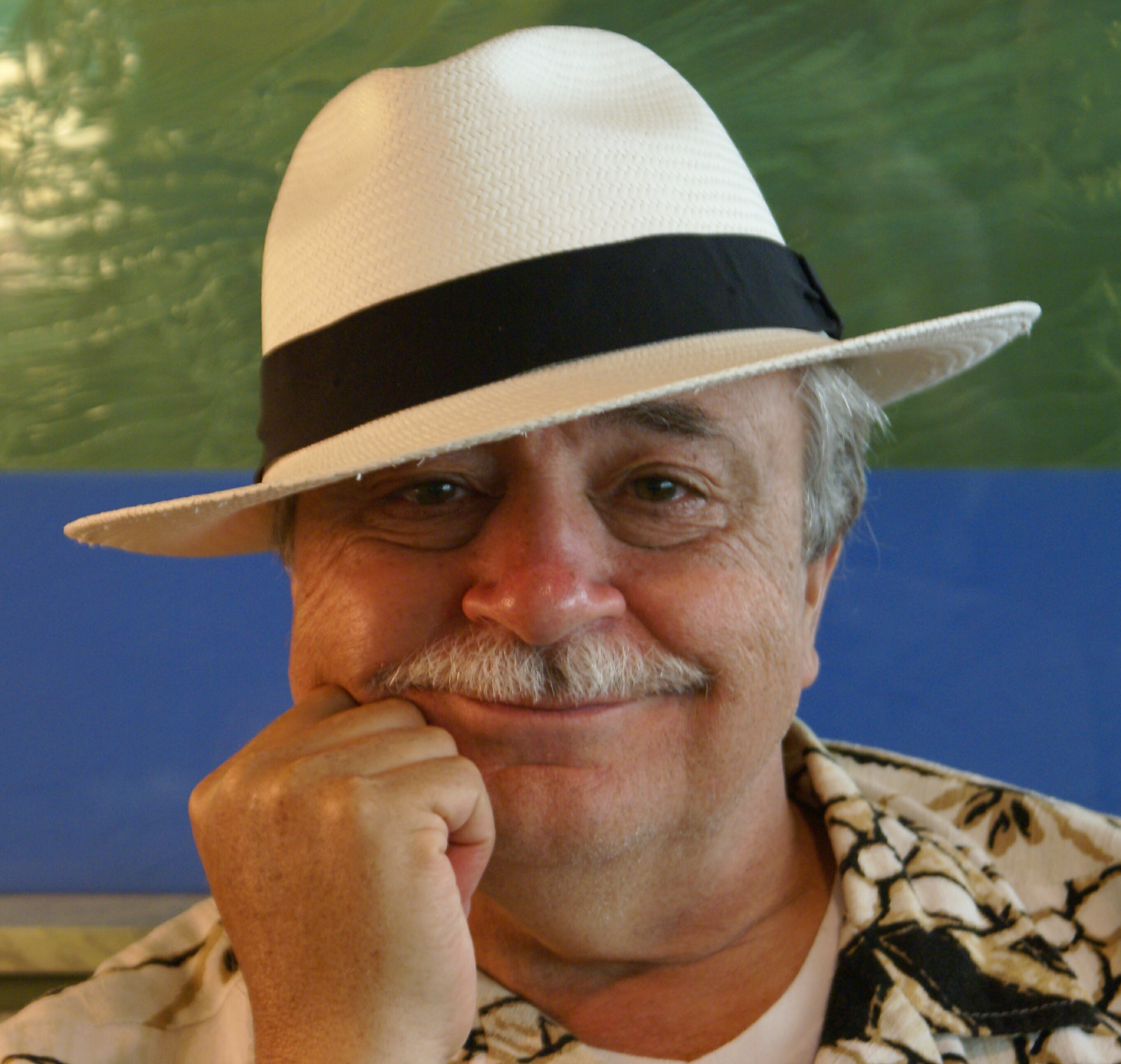
Sándor J. Kovács (2012 photo)

Sándor J. Kovács (born August 17, 1947) is a Hungarian-American academic cardiologist and cardiovascular physiologist, best known for his work on the physiological dynamics of the human heart. He is a professor of medicine, physics, physiology, and biomedical engineering at Washington University in St. Louis.

== Early life and education ==
Born in Budapest, Hungary, Kovács, with his parents and sister, fled Hungary at the time of the Hungarian Revolution of 1956. The family was interned in Austrian refugee camps until 1959, when they were allowed to immigrate to Brooklyn, New York. As Kovács recalled in an interview,

I remember there were no refrigerators, just iceboxes. And if you wanted chicken for dinner, you went to the market and brought home a live chicken, holding it by its feet.

Kovács graduated from Brooklyn Technical High School and earned a B.S. in engineering at Cornell University in 1969. He then went to Caltech, where he initially studied theoretical and applied mechanics, transferred to physics and worked with Kip S. Thorne, receiving a Ph.D. in theoretical physics in 1977. The title of his thesis was "The Generation of Gravitational Waves". While at Caltech, he was influenced by many interactions with Richard Feynman and George Zweig, when the latter was interested in the physics and physiology of human hearing.

Determined to change from theoretical physics to medicine, Kovács entered an accelerated Ph.D. to M.D. program at the University of Miami that awarded him a medical degree after 22 months of concentrated study, in 1979.

== Career ==
Kovács' subsequent career has been entirely at Washington University in St. Louis. After an internship and residency at Barnes Hospital, he became an instructor in medicine in 1985, served as director of the cardiac catheterization laboratory at the St Louis VA Medical Center (1985-1990) advancing through the ranks to professor of medicine, with also appointments in physiology, biomedical engineering, and physics, in 2007.

The Kovács research group is primarily a theory group which has pioneered conceptual frameworks for analyzing diastole by incorporating and kinematically modeling the suction pump role of the heart, and the dynamics of the four-chambered heart in the space of coordinates spanned by P (pressure), V (volume), and their time rates of change dP/dt and dV/dt. They then seek to validate the model predictions using human, in vivo physiologic measurements of pressures (high fidelity transducers) and flows (echocardiography) of masses and volumes of heart chambers (cardiac MRI).

Among the results from this work is that the so-called third heart sound, "S3", formerly taught to be pathological, is actually produced by all hearts, but is merely below the threshold of hearing of most physicians.

Additional advances include the 'Parametrized Diastolic Filling (PDF) Formalism' wherein the early, mechanical suction-initiated rapid filling portion of diastole (the echocardiographic Doppler E-wave) is modeled kinematically in analogy to the recoil, from rest, of a damped simple harmonic oscillator. The linearity of the model allows solution of the inverse problem of diastole, using the digitized clinical Doppler E-wave contour as input, and obtaining unique values of the PDF parameters, that characterize load, viscosity/relaxation and chamber stiffness for each E-wave analyzed as output. Investigators at the Karolinska Institutet have made free software available, called Echo E-waves at www.echoewaves.org that facilitates rapid PDF formalism based assessment of diastolic function. Furthermore, the Echo E-waves program computes the load independent index of diastolic function (LIIDF).

Among its many applications the PDF formalism led to solution of the long sought 'load-independent index of diastolic function' (LIIDF) problem, and to the realization that left ventricular volume at diastasis is the in vivo equilibrium volume of the left ventricle. In addition, kinematic characterization of diastolic function has advanced understanding of form and function via the relationship of vortex formation and endocardial motion to achieve optimal volume pumping in diastole. Additional insight into the physiology of diastole has been achieved by the recognition that hydraulic forces, generated by the time varying cross sectional area difference between the left atrium and left ventricle, play a role in longitudinal volume accommodation by the ventricle.

Kovács spends about half of his time on clinical activities, including performing diagnostic cardiac catheterizations involving simultaneous echocardiography complemented by related cardiac MRI techniques. In addition, he has taught a one semester, BME department, junior level course on Quantitative Cardiovascular Physiology.

== Selected publications ==
- Chung C, Shmuylovich L, Kovács SJ. "What global diastolic function is, what it is not, and how to measure it." American Journal of Physiology Heart and Circulatory Physiology doi:10.1152/ajpheart.00436.2015.
- Shmuylovich L, Chung CS, Kovács SJ, Yellin E, Nikolic SD. Point-Counterpoint: Left ventricular volume during diastasis IS/IS NOT the physiologic in-vivo equilibrium volume and IS/IS NOT related to diastolic suction? Journal of Applied Physiology 2009 Dec 24. (JAPPL-01399-2009).
- Shmuylovich L, Kovács SJ. Stiffness and relaxation components of the exponential and logistic time-constants may be used to derive a load-independent index of isovolumic pressure decay. American Journal of Physiology Heart and Circulatory Physiology 2008 Dec 295(6):H2551-9. Epub 2008 Oct 24.
- Zhang W, Kovács SJ. The Diastatic Pressure-Volume Relationship Is Not the Same as the End-Diastolic Pressure-Volume Relationship. American Journal of PhysiologyHeart and Circulatory Physiology 2008doi:10.1152/ajpheart.00200.
- Riordan MM, Weiss EP, Meyer TE, Ehsani AA, Racette SB, Villareal D, Fontana L, Holloszy JO, Kovács SJ. The Effects of Caloric Restriction- and Exercise-Induced Weight Loss on Left Ventricular Diastolic Function. American Journal of Physiology Heart and Circulatory Physiology 2008 294:H1174-82.
- Chung CS, Kovács SJ. The Physical Determinants of Left Ventricular Isovolumic Pressure Decline: Model Prediction with in-vivo Validation. American Journal of Physiology, Heart and Circulatory Physiology 2008 294:1589-1596.

== Honors ==
Kovács received the Sjöstrand Medal in Physiology from the Swedish Society of Clinical Physiology and Medicine in 2007. He was elected President of the Cardiovascular System Dynamics Society (CSDS) in 2006 and served until 2008. He is a recipient of the Öcsi Bácsi Award of Caltech's TAPIR Group. He is a distinguished foreign member of the Hungarian Society of Cardiology. He has been elected twice as president of the Barnes-Jewish Hospital Medical Staff Association (2003-2004 and 2015–2016) and served as a member of the Board of Barnes-Jewish Hospital (2015-2016). He is the recipient of Barnes-Jewish Hospital Medical Association's Lifetime Achievement "Master Physician" Award, April 2017. In May 2018, for his contributions to quantitative cardiovascular physiology and mathematical modeling of heart pumping function, Kovács received an honorary degree from Lund University, Faculty of Medicine. For his contributions to elucidating the physiology of diastole he was elected Honorary Member of the Hungarian Academy of Sciences in 2022.
