= Vladimir Braginsky =

Russian physicist (1931–2016)

- Born: Vladimir Borisovich Braginsky; 3 August 1931; Moscow, Russian SFSR, USSR
- Died: 29 March 2016 (aged 84); Moscow, Russia
- Citizenship: Russian
- Education: Lomonosov Moscow State University
- Known for: Quantum nondemolition measurement Gravitational waves measurement
- Awards: Humboldt Prize by Alexander von Humboldt Foundation (1993); Special Breakthrough Prize in Fundamental Physics (2016)
- Scientific career
- Fields: Quantum Physics; Experimental gravitation
- Workplaces: MSU Faculty of Physics

Vladimir Borisovich Braginsky (3 August 1931 – 29 March 2016) was a Russian experimental and theoretical physicist and a corresponding member of the Russian Academy of Sciences (RAS), and foreign member of the US National Academy of Sciences.

He worked in the areas of precision and quantum measurements, the detection of gravitational waves, systems with low dissipation, and fundamental thermodynamic fluctuations.

== Biography ==
Braginsky was born in Moscow and graduated from the Physics Department of Moscow State University in 1954, where he had been working since 1955. In 1959, he defended his thesis, and in 1967 his doctoral thesis. In 1969, he was appointed a professor.

== Scientific career ==
In the 1970s, Braginsky headed the Physics Department of Moscow State University. In the 1987 to 2001 period, he headed the department of "Molecular Physics and Physical Measurements". From 2001 to 2002, he was the head of the department of "Physics of oscillations." Braginsky is the author of over 240 articles and 4 monographs.

He predicted and experimentally demonstrated ponderomotive effects of friction and stiffness in the electromagnetic field of the resonator (1967). These effects underlie many modern developments in macroscopic quantum mechanics, in particular, optical and micro cooling nanooscillators to the zero state. It proves that units of the electron charge and the proton at 10^{−21} (1970) and demonstrated the validity of the equivalence principle at the level of 10^{−12} (1971).

They predicted the existence of the limits of the sensitivity of the coordinate measurements of quantum origin, now called the standard quantum limit (1967), proposed and justified principles for a new class of measurement, allowing to overcome these limitations (quantum non-demolition measurements, 1977).

Beginning in 1974, together with colleagues in the department, he discovered the existence of a fundamental loss mechanism for electromagnetic waves in perfect crystals, dielectrics, thereby creating dielectric microwave resonators in sapphire with Q > 10^{9}. In 1989, he suggested high-Q optical microcavities with whispering gallery modes.

Together with colleagues, he developed a number of key elements for the detectors of gravitational waves (both the bars and the laser interferometers), in particular the suspension of the proof mass with a relaxation time greater than 5 years.

Braginsky and colleagues also predicted the existence of several new physical effects: the spin-quadrupole gravitational effect (1980), the friction generated by zero-point fluctuations of the vacuum (1991), and fundamental thermoelastic and thermorefractive fluctuations (1999, 2000), and parametric instabilities in high-Q opto-mechanical resonators (2001).

Since 1993, the research group of Braginsky has been working within the international research project called LIGO.

Braginsky has also produced a large cadre of students: of the 34 PhD candidates prepared, 12 have achieved the Doctor of Science degree, including six professors working in various departments of the Faculty of Physics at Moscow State University. Some of his other former students successfully work in institutes of the RAS and abroad.

== Bibliography ==
- Google Scholar page for 'VB Braginsky'
