= Quantum nondemolition measurement =

Type of measurement of a quantum system

Quantum nondemolition (QND) measurement is a special type of measurement of a quantum system in which the uncertainty of the measured observable does not increase from its measured value during the subsequent normal evolution of the system. This necessarily requires that the measurement process preserves the physical integrity of the measured system, and moreover places requirements on the relationship between the measured observable and the self-Hamiltonian of the system. In a sense, QND measurements are the "most classical" and least disturbing type of measurement in quantum mechanics.

Most devices capable of detecting a single particle and measuring its position strongly modify the particle's state in the measurement process, e.g. photons are destroyed when striking a screen. Less dramatically, the measurement may simply perturb the particle in an unpredictable way; a second measurement, no matter how quickly after the first, is then not guaranteed to find the particle in the same location. Even for ideal, "first-kind" projective measurements in which the particle is in the measured eigenstate immediately after the measurement, the subsequent free evolution of the particle will cause uncertainty in position to quickly grow.

In contrast, a momentum (rather than position) measurement of a free particle can be QND because the momentum distribution is preserved by the particle's self-Hamiltonian p^{2}/2m. Because the Hamiltonian of the free particle commutes with the momentum operator, a momentum eigenstate is also an energy eigenstate, so once momentum is measured its uncertainty does not increase due to free evolution.

Note that the term "nondemolition" does not imply that the wave function fails to collapse.

QND measurements are extremely difficult to carry out experimentally. Much of the investigation into QND measurements was motivated by the desire to avoid the standard quantum limit in the experimental detection of gravitational waves. The general theory of QND measurements was laid out by Braginsky, Vorontsov, and Thorne following much theoretical work by Braginsky, Caves, Drever, Hollenhorts, Khalili, Sandberg, Thorne, Unruh, Vorontsov, and Zimmermann.

== Technical definition ==
Let $A$ be an observable for some system $\mathcal{S}$ with self-Hamiltonian $H_{\mathcal{S}}$. The system $\mathcal{S}$ is measured by an apparatus $\mathcal{R}$ which is coupled to $\mathcal{S}$ through interactions Hamiltonian $H_{\mathcal{RS}}$ for only brief moments. Otherwise, ${\mathcal{S}}$ evolves freely according to $H_{\mathcal{S}}$. A precise measurement of $A$ is one which brings the global state of $\mathcal{S}$ and $\mathcal{R}$ into the approximate form

$$\vert \psi \rangle \approx \sum_i \vert A_i \rangle_\mathcal{S} \vert R_i \rangle_\mathcal{R}$$

where $\vert A_i \rangle_\mathcal{S}$ are the eigenvectors of $A$ corresponding to the possible outcomes of the measurement, and $\vert R_i \rangle_\mathcal{R}$ are the corresponding states of the apparatus which record them.

Allow time-dependence to denote the Heisenberg picture observables:

$$A(t) = e^{i t H_\mathcal{S}} A e^{-i t H_\mathcal{S}}.$$

A sequence of measurements of $A$ are said to be QND measurements if and only if

$$[A(t_n),A(t_m)] = 0$$

for any $t_n$ and $t_m$ when measurements are made. If this property holds for any choice of $t_n$ and $t_m$, then $A$ is said to be a continuous QND variable. If this only holds for certain discrete times, then $A$ is said to be a stroboscopic QND variable. For example, in the case of a free particle, the energy and momentum are conserved and indeed continuous QND observables, but the position is not. On the other hand, for the harmonic oscillator the position and momentum satisfy periodic in time commutation relations which imply that x and p are not continuous QND observables. However, if one makes the measurements at times separated by an integral numbers of half-periods (τ = kπ/ω), then the commutators vanish. This means that x and p are stroboscopic QND observables.

== Discussion ==
An observable $A$ which is conserved under free evolution,

$$\frac{\mathrm{d}}{\mathrm{d}t} A(t) = \frac{i}{\hbar} [H_\mathcal{S} , A ] = 0,$$

is automatically a QND variable. A sequence of ideal projective measurements of $A$ will automatically be QND measurements.

To implement QND measurements on atomic systems, the measurement strength (rate) is competing with atomic decay caused by measurement backaction. People usually use optical depth or cooperativity to characterize the relative ratio between measurement strength and the optical decay. By using nanophotonic waveguides as a quantum interface, it is actually possible to enhance atom-light coupling with a relatively weak field, and hence an enhanced precise quantum measurement with little disruption to the quantum system.

== Criticism ==
It has been argued that the usage of the term QND does not add anything to the usual notion of a strong quantum measurement and can moreover be confusing because of the two different meanings of the word demolition in a quantum system (losing the quantum state vs. losing the particle).

== See also ==
- Interaction-free measurement
