= The Science of Interstellar =

2014 book by Kip Thorne

- Softcover edition
- Author: Kip Thorne
- Language: English
- Subject: Physics, cosmology
- Genre: Non-fiction
- Publisher: W. W. Norton & Company
- Publication date: November 7, 2014
- Publication place: United States
- Media type: Print
- Pages: 336 pp.
- ISBN: 978-0393351378
- Preceded by: Black Holes and Time Warps (1994)

The Science of Interstellar is a non-fiction book by American theoretical physicist and Nobel laureate Kip Thorne, with a foreword by Christopher Nolan. The book was initially published on November 7, 2014 by W. W. Norton & Company. This is his second full-size book for non-scientists after Black Holes and Time Warps, released in 1994. The Science of Interstellar is a follow-up text for Nolan's 2014 film Interstellar, starring Matthew McConaughey, Anne Hathaway, and Jessica Chastain.

== Overview ==
Kip Thorne was the scientific consultant and an executive producer for the movie. In this book he explains the scientific concepts behind the film's cosmological ideas. The book is composed of seven parts with a foreword by Christopher Nolan and one additional chapter discussing the inception of Interstellar. Thorne starts by laying out introductory information about the universe, spacetime, physical laws, relativity, tidal forces, and black holes. The next section covers the supermassive black hole Gargantua, explaining its appearance and how it was created via CGI, as well as gravitational slingshots and a scientifically inaccurate statement by a character in the film. Thorne then shifts to Earth, discussing the crop-destroying blight, development of interstellar travel technologies, and another scientifically inaccurate statement in the film. The next part discusses the wormhole, explaining the basics of how wormholes work, how Interstellar's wormhole was rendered via CGI, and a method by which the wormhole could have been discovered in Interstellar's universe via the detection of gravitational waves. Thorne then explores the development of planets orbiting a supermassive black hole and how the planets depicted in the film could form in real life. The next section discusses some of the more advanced and extreme physics depicted in the film, including large extra dimensions, warping the gravitational constant, and the different types of singularities inside a black hole, including the BKL, mass-inflation, and shock singularities. The final part discusses the climax of the film, including Cooper's plunge into the black hole Gargantua, the tesseract scene and four-dimensional space, and getting colonies of people off of the Earth.

== See also ==
=== Related articles ===
- Bootstrap paradox
- Event horizon
- Interstellar spacecraft
- Interstellar travel
- Wormholes in fiction

=== Similar books ===
- Parallel Worlds by Michio Kaku
- The Elegant Universe by Brian Greene
- The Fabric of the Cosmos by Brian Greene
- The Fabric of Reality by David Deutsch
- The Universe in a Nutshell by Stephen Hawking
