= Hiding in the Mirror =

2005 book by Lawrence M. Krauss

- Softcover edition
- Author: Lawrence M. Krauss
- Language: English
- Subject: Extra dimensions
- Genre: Non-fiction
- Published: October 20, 2005
- Publisher: Viking Press
- Publication place: United States
- Media type: Print, e-book
- Pages: 276 pp.
- ISBN: 0670033952
- OCLC: 62128070
- Dewey Decimal: 530.11
- LC Class: QC173.59.S65
- Preceded by: Atom
- Followed by: Quantum Man

Hiding in the Mirror is a popular science book by the theoretical physicist Lawrence M. Krauss. The text was initially published on October 20, 2005 by Viking Press. This is his seventh non-fiction book.

== Synopsis ==
The work draws on the works of scientists, mathematicians, artists, and writers to consider the cultural and scientific aspects of extra dimensions. The book explores popular theories about such topics as black holes, life in other dimensions, and string theory.

== Review ==
A reviewer of Publishers Weekly mentioned "Physicist Krauss offers an erudite and well-crafted overview of the role multiple dimensions have played in the history of physics. This isn't an easy book, even with a writer as talented as Krauss (whom some will recognize as the author of The Physics of Star Trek and Beyond Star Trek) serving as one's Virgil. Long on science and short on its connections with culture, the book is essentially an introduction to the physics and mathematics of extra dimensions with a few more or less disconnected chapters that touch on how these ideas show up in art and popular culture; there's more on brane-world and the ekpyrotic universe than on Plato's cave, whose inhabitants could not perceive reality in all its dimensions, or Buckaroo Banzai."

== See also ==
- Euclidean space
- Fourth dimension in art
- Four-dimensionalism
- Fifth dimension
- Sixth dimension

=== Similar books ===
- Flatland, a book by Edwin A. Abbott about two- and three-dimensional spaces, to understand the concept of four dimensions
- Sphereland, an unofficial sequel to Flatland
- The Fourth Dimension by Rudy Rucker
- Warped Passages, a book by Lisa Randall
