= What Is Real? =

2018 book by Adam Becker

What Is Real?: The Unfinished Quest for the Meaning of Quantum Physics
- Author: Adam Becker
- Language: English
- Publication date: 2018

What Is Real?: The Unfinished Quest for the Meaning of Quantum Physics is a book on quantum physics by American astronomer Adam Becker. It was first published in 2018.

== Background ==
Becker had been a member of the California Quantum Interpretation Network, "a research collaboration among faculty and staff at multiple UC campuses and other universities across California, focusing on the interpretation of quantum physics."

In 2016, he received a grant from the Alfred P. Sloan Foundation to research and publish a written work concerning the history, development, and controversy surrounding the study and development of the mysticized field of Quantum Foundations. The resulting work, What is Real? (2018), focused on the question of what exactly quantum physics says about the nature of reality. Becker stated the motivation for the book as follows:

Despite the fact that every physicist agrees that quantum physics works, a bitter debate has raged over its meaning for the past ninety years, since the theory was first developed.

== Themes ==
The book deals with the personalities behind the competing interpretations of quantum physics as well as the historical factors that influenced the debate—factors such as military spending on physics research due to World War II, the Cold War ethos that caused the eschewing of physicists thought to be Marxist, the assumed infallibility of John von Neumann, the sexism that quashed the work of Grete Hermann (the female mathematician who first spotted von Neumann's error), and the sway of prominent philosophical schools of the period, like the logical positivists of the Vienna Circle. Niels Bohr appears in the book as the charismatic figure whose stature and obtuse writing style made it hard for alternate interpretations to be voiced. The book also challenges the popular portrayal of Albert Einstein as a behind-the-times thinker who couldn't accept the new paradigm. Becker argues that Einstein's thought experiments aimed at quantum dynamics are not stodgy quibbles with the seeming randomness of quantum physics, as characterized by the popularity of the quote that "God does not play dice". Rather, Einstein's thought experiments are apt critiques of violations of the principle of locality.

== Reception ==
"What is Real?" was given mostly positive reviews by lay and expert audiences alike, including the New York Times, Publishers Weekly, the Wall Street Journal, and New Scientist, among others,.

In Physics Today, philosopher David Wallace called the book "a superb contribution both to popular understanding of quantum theory and to ongoing debates among experts." And in the journal Nature, Ramin Skibba said "What Is Real? is an argument for keeping an open mind. Becker reminds us that we need humility as we investigate the myriad interpretations and narratives that explain the same data." The journal Science explained, "What Is Real? offers an engaging and accessible overview of the debates surrounding the interpretation of quantum mechanics". Philosopher of science, Tim Maudlin said, "There is no more reliable, careful, and readable account of the whole history of quantum theory in all its scandalous detail."

Physicist Sheldon Glashow wrote a critical review, saying, "I found it distasteful to find a trained astrophysicist invoking a conspiracy by physicists and physics teachers to foist the Copenhagen interpretation upon naive students of quantum mechanics". A review in the journal Science declared the project to be the sporadically accurate presentation of an "oversimplified" summary of either imaginary or merely ostensible conflicts between very complex schools of thought. Reviews in Science News and the American Journal of Physics were also negative, similarly criticizing the book for numerous historical inaccuracies and philosophical oversimplifications.

The book was nominated for the PEN/E. O. Wilson Literary Science Writing Award and Physics World Magazine's Book of the Year Award.
