= Gus Holwerda =

American film director (born 1975)

- Born: December 29, 1975 (age 49); Jacksonville, Florida, United States of America
- Occupations: Film director, screenwriter
- Years active: 2005–present

Gus Holwerda is an American film director. He wrote, directed, and produced the documentary The Unbelievers, which follows scientists Lawrence Krauss and Richard Dawkins.

== Career ==
Holwerda began his career writing and directing short films, and wrote and acted in the action TV series The Unjust.

In 2013, Holwerda released The Unbelievers, a documentary about atheism, which starred Richard Dawkins and Lawrence Krauss. The film had its world premier at Hot Docs in Toronto, Ontario, Canada.

Holwerda released his first narrative feature film, a sci-fi, titled Intersect in 2020.

Together with his brother Luke, who is a cinematographer, Holwerda since 2019 creates The Jeremy Brett Sherlock Holmes podcast, on the Granada TV series where Jeremy Brett played Sherlock Holmes. In 2024, as a 40th anniversary celebration of the series, the brothers staged an event in Guildford, England called Brettcon, with guests including actors and costume designers from the series.

== Personal life ==
The Holwerda brothers grew up in a fundamentalist Christian family.
