= The Greatest Story Ever Told—So Far =

Book by Lawrence M. Krauss

The Greatest Story Ever Told—So Far: Why Are We Here?
- Hardcover edition
- Author: Lawrence M. Krauss
- Language: English
- Subject: Physics, cosmogony
- Genre: Non-fiction
- Published: March 21, 2017
- Publisher: Atria Books
- Publication place: United States
- Media type: Print, e-book
- Pages: 336 pp.
- ISBN: 978-1-4767-7761-0
- Preceded by: A Universe from Nothing
- Followed by: The Physics of Climate Change

The Greatest Story Ever Told—So Far: Why Are We Here? is the tenth full-length non-fiction book by the American theoretical physicist Lawrence M. Krauss. The book was initially published on March 21, 2017, by Atria Books.

== Synopsis ==
The book deals with the current scientific understanding of the creation of the Universe and gives a history of how scientists have formulated the Standard Model of Particle Physics. Krauss also details how symmetries have blazed the path for the major breakthroughs of modern particle physics.

== Reception ==
A reviewer of Publishers Weekly stated: "In confident and verbose prose, Krauss tells a story that both celebrates and explores science. Through it, he reminds readers why scientists build such complicated machinery and push the boundaries of the quantum world when nothing makes sense: “For no more practical reason than to celebrate and explore the beauty of nature." David Warmflash of Wired UK commented "Author Lawrence Krauss' upcoming book is all about the history of physics and modern research, encompassing both cosmology and subatomic physics; what Krauss describes as particle astrophysics. It’s a science book. And yet, most of the chapters open with a biblical quote."
