= Physics World =

Journal

- Cover of May 2019 issue
- Editor: Matin Durrani
- Categories: Science
- Frequency: monthly
- Circulation: 50,000 (2013)
- First issue: 1988; 38 years ago
- Company: IOP Publishing Ltd
- Country: United Kingdom
- Based in: Bristol
- Language: English
- Website: physicsworld.com
- ISSN: 0953-8585

Physics World is the membership magazine of the Institute of Physics, one of the largest physical societies in the world. It is an international monthly magazine covering all areas of physics, pure and applied, and is aimed at physicists in research, industry, physics outreach, and education worldwide.

== Overview ==
The magazine was launched in 1988 by IOP Publishing Ltd, under the founding editorship of Philip Campbell. The magazine is made available free of cost to members of the Institute of Physics, who can access a digital edition of the magazine; selected articles can be read by anyone for free online. It was redesigned in September 2005 and has an audited circulation of just under 35000.

The current editor is Matin Durrani. Others on the team are Michael Banks (news editor) and Tushna Commissariat and Sarah Teah (features editors). Hamish Johnston, Margaret Harris and Tami Freeman are online editors.

Alongside the print and online magazine, Physics World produces films and two podcasts. The Physics World Stories podcast is hosted by Andrew Glester and is produced monthly. The Physics World Weekly podcast is hosted by James Dacey.

== Breakthrough of the Year ==
The magazine makes two awards each year. These are the Physics World Breakthrough of the Year and the Physics World Book of the Year, which have both been awarded annually since 2009.

Top 10 works and winners of the Breakthrough of the Year

2009: "to August Jonathan Home and colleagues at NIST for unveiled the first small-scale device that could be described as a complete "quantum computer"

- Top results from Tevatron
- Spins spotted in room-temperature silicon
- Graphane makes its debut
- Magnetic monopoles spotted in spin ices
- Water on the Moon
- Atoms teleport information over long distance
- Black-hole analogue traps sound
- Dark matter spotted in Minnesota
- A 2.36 TeV big bang at the LHC

2010: "to ALPHA and the ASACUSA group at CERN for have created new ways of controlling antihydrogen"

- Exoplanet atmosphere laid bare
- Quantum effects seen in a visible object
- Visible-light cloaking of large objects
- Hail the first sound lasers
- A Bose–Einstein condensate from light
- Relativity with a human touch
- Towards a Star Wars telepresence
- Proton is smaller than we thought
- CERN achieves landmark collisions

2011: Aephraim M. Steinberg and colleagues from the University of Toronto in Canada for using the technique of "weak measurement" to track the average paths of single photons passing through a Young's interference experiment.

- Measuring the wavefunction
- Cloaking in space and time
- Measuring the universe using black holes
- Turning darkness into light
- Taking the temperature of the early universe
- Catching the flavour of a neutrino oscillation
- Living laser brought to life
- Complete quantum computer made on a single chip
- Seeing pure relics from the Big Bang

2012: "to the ATLAS and CMS collaborations at CERN for their joint discovery of a Higgs-like particle at the Large Hadron Collider".

- Majorana fermions
- Time-reversal violation
- Galaxy-cluster motion
- Peering through opaque materials
- Room-temperature maser
- Wiping data will cost you energy
- Entangling twisted beams
- Neutrino-based communication
- Generating and storing energy in one step

2013: "the IceCube Neutrino Observatory for making the first observations of high-energy cosmic neutrinos".

- Nuclear physics goes pear-shaped
- Creating 'molecules' of light
- Planck reveals 'almost perfect' universe
- Quantum microscope' peers into the hydrogen atom
- Quantum state endures for 39 minutes at room temperature
- The first carbon-nanotube computer
- B-mode polarization spotted in cosmic microwave background
- The first laser-cooled Bose–Einstein condensate
- Hofstadter's butterfly spotted in graphene

2014: "to the landing by the European Space Agency of the Philae (spacecraft) on 67P/Churyumov–Gerasimenko", which was the first time a probe had been landed on a comet

- Quasar shines a bright light on cosmic web
- Neutrinos spotted from Sun's main nuclear reaction
- Laser fusion passes milestone
- Electrons' magnetic interactions isolated at long last
- Disorder sharpens optical-fibre images
- Data stored in magnetic holograms
- Lasers ignite 'supernovae' in the lab
- Quantum data are compressed for the first time
- Physicists sound-out acoustic tractor beam

2015: "for being the first to achieve the simultaneous quantum teleportation of two inherent properties of a fundamental particle – the photon".

- Cyclotron radiation from a single electron is measured for the first time
- Weyl fermions are spotted at long last
- Physicists claim 'loophole-free' Bell-violation experiment
- First visible light detected directly from an exoplanet
- LHCb claims discovery of two pentaquarks
- Hydrogen sulphide is warmest ever superconductor at 203 K
- Portable 'battlefield MRI' comes out of the lab
- Fermionic microscope sees first light
- Silicon quantum logic gate is a first

2016: "to LIGO's gravitational wave discovery".

- Schrödinger's cat lives and dies in two boxes at once
- Elusive nuclear-clock transition spotted in thorium-229
- New gravimeter-on-a-chip is tiny yet extremely sensitive
- Negative refraction of electrons spotted in graphene
- Rocky planet found in habitable zone around Sun's nearest neighbour
- Physicists take entanglement beyond identical ions
- 'Radical' new microscope lens combines high resolution with large field of view
- Quantum computer simulates fundamental particle interactions for the first time
- The single-atom engine that could

2017: "to First multimessenger observation of a neutron star merger".

- Physicists create first ‘topological’ laser
- Lightning makes radioactive isotopes
- Super-resolution microscope combines Nobel-winning technologies
- Particle-free quantum communication is achieved in the lab
- Ultra-high-energy cosmic rays have extra-galactic origins
- ‘Time crystals’ built in the lab
- Metamaterial enhances natural cooling without power input
- Three-photon interference measured at long last
- Muons reveal hidden void in Egyptian pyramid

2018: "Discovery that led to the development of “twistronics”, which is a new and very promising technique for adjusting the electronic properties of graphene by rotating adjacent layers of the material."

- Multifunctional carbon fibres enable “massless” energy storage
- Compensator expands global access to advanced radiotherapy
- IPCC Special Report on 1.5 °C climate change
- EXPLORER PET/CT produces first total-body scans
- Combustion-free, propeller-free plane takes flight
- Quantum mechanics defies causal order, experiment confirms
- Activating retinal stem cells restores vision in mice
- Ancient hydrogen reveals clues to dark matter’s identity
- Superconductivity spotted in a quasicrystal

2019: "First direct observation of a black hole and its ‘shadow’ by the Event Horizon Telescope"

- Neuroprosthetic devices translate brain activity into speech
- First detection of a “Marsquake”
- CERN physicists spot symmetry violation in charm mesons
- “Little Big Coil” creates record-breaking continuous magnetic field
- Casimir effect creates “quantum trap” for tiny objects
- Antimatter quantum interferometry makes its debut
- Quantum computer outperforms conventional supercomputer
- Trapped interferometer makes a compact gravity probe
- Wearable MEG scanner used with children for the first time

2020: "Silicon-based light with a direct band gap in microelectronics"

- Taking snapshots of a quantum measurement
- Quantum correlations discovered in massive mirrors
- Borexino spots solar neutrinos from elusive fusion cycle
- First observation of a ferroelectric nematic liquid crystal
- Thin-film perovskite detectors slash imaging dose
- Fundamental constants set limit on speed of sound
- Expanding twistronics to photons
- Mixed beams enhance particle therapy accuracy
- The first room-temperature superconductor

2021: "Quantum entanglement of two macroscopic objects"

- Restoring speech in a paralysed man
- Making 30 lasers emit as one
- Quantifying wave–particle duality
- Milestone for laser fusion
- Innovative particle cooling techniques
- Observing a black hole’s magnetic field
- Achieving coherent quantum control of nuclei
- Observing Pauli blocking in ultracold fermionic gases
- Confirming the muon’s theory-defying magnetism

2022: "Deflection of a near-Earth asteroid by DART satellite"

- Ushering in a new era for ultracold chemistry
- Observing the tetraneutron
- Super-efficient electricity generation
- The fastest possible optoelectronic switch
- Opening a new window on the universe by JWST
- First-in-human FLASH proton therapy
- Perfecting light transmission and absorption
- Cubic boron arsenide is a champion semiconductor
- Detecting an Aharonov–Bohm effect for gravity

2023: "Brain–computer interface that allowed a paralysed man to walk"

- Growing electrodes inside living tissue
- Neutrinos probe the proton’s structure
- Simulating an expanding universe in a BEC
- A double slit in time
- Building blocks for a large-scale quantum network
- First X-ray image of a single atom
- “Smoking gun” evidence of early galaxies transforming the universe
- Supersonic cracks in materials
- Antimatter does not fall up
- Fusion energy breakthrough

2024: "Quantum error correction with 48 logical qubits; and independently, below the surface code threshold"

- Light-absorbing dye turns skin of live mouse transparent
- Laser cooling positronium
- Modelling lung cells to personalize radiotherapy
- A semiconductor and a novel switch made from graphene
- Detecting the decay of individual nuclei
- Two distinct descriptions of nuclei unified for the first time
- New titanium:sapphire laser is tiny, low-cost and tuneable
- Entangled photons conceal and enhance images
- First samples returned from the Moon’s far side

== Book of the Year ==
Top 10 books and the Book of the Year winner

A blue ribbon appears against the winner.

2009: The Strangest Man: The Hidden Life of Paul Dirac, Quantum Genius by Graham Farmelo

- The Physics of Rugby – Trevor Davis (Nottingham University Press)
- First Principles: The Crazy Business of Doing Serious Science – Howard Burton (Key Porter Books)
- Oliver Heaviside: Maverick Mastermind of Electricity – Basil Mahon (Institute of Engineering and Technology)
- Atomic: The First War of Physics and the Secret History of the Atom Bomb – Jim Baggott (Icon Books)
- Lives in Science – Joseph C Hermanowicz (University of Chicago Press)
- 13 Things That Don't Make Sense – Michael Brooks (Profile Books)
- Deciphering the Cosmic Number: The Strange Friendship of Wolfgang Pauli and Carl Jung – Arthur I Miller (W W Norton)
- Perfect Rigor – Masha Gessen (Houghton Mifflin Harcourt)
- Plastic Fantastic: How the Biggest Fraud in Physics Shook the Scientific World – Eugenie Samuel Reich (Palgrave Macmillan)

2010: The Edge of Physics: Dispatches from the Frontiers of Cosmology by Anil Ananthaswamy

- The Tunguska Mystery – Vladimir Rubtsov (Springer)
- Coming Climate Crisis? Consider the Past, Beware the Big Fix – Claire L Parkinson (Rowman & Littlefield)
- How It Ends – Chris Impey (W W Norton)
- Lake Views: This World and the Universe – Steven Weinberg (Harvard University Press)
- The Quants: How a New Breed of Math Whizzes Conquered Wall Street and Nearly Destroyed It – Scott Patterson (Crown Business)
- Newton and the Counterfeiter – Thomas Levenson (Faber and Faber)
- Packing for Mars – Mary Roach (One World Publications/ W W Norton)
- Massive: The Hunt for the God Particle – Ian Sample (Virgin Books/Basic Books)
- How to Teach Quantum Physics to Your Dog – Chad Orzel

2011: Quantum Man: Richard Feynman's Life in Science by Lawrence Krauss from Case Western Reserve University

- Engineering Animals – Mark Denny and Alan McFadzean
- Measure of the Earth: the Enlightenment Expedition that Reshaped the World – Larrie Ferreiro
- The Hidden Reality: Parallel Universes and the Deep Laws of the Cosmos – Brian Greene
- Lab Coats in Hollywood: Science, Scientists and Cinema – David Kirby
- Quantum Man: Richard Feynman's Life in Science – Lawrence Krauss
- Rising Force: the Magic of Magnetic Levitation – James Livingston
- Modernist Cuisine – Nathan Myhrvold, Chris Young and Maxime Bilet
- The 4% Universe: Dark Matter, Dark Energy, and the Race to Discover the Rest of Reality – Richard Panek
- Radioactive: Marie and Pierre Curie, A Tale of Love and Fallout – Lauren Redniss
- Hindsight and Popular Astronomy – Alan Whiting

2012: How the Hippies Saved Physics by David Kaiser from the Massachusetts Institute of Technology

- A Hole at the Bottom of the Sea: The Race to Kill the BP Oil Gusher – Joel Achenbach
- The Science Magpie: A Hoard of Fascinating Facts – Simon Flynn
- The Idea Factory: Bell Labs and the Great Age of American Innovation – Jon Gertner
- Erwin Schrödinger and the Quantum Revolution – John Gribbin
- The Geek Manifesto: Why Science Matters – Mark Henderson
- Life's Ratchet: How Molecular Machines Extract Order from Chaos – Peter M Hoffmann
- How the Hippies Saved Physics: Science, Counterculture and the Quantum Revival – David Kaiser
- How to Teach Relativity to Your Dog – Chad Orzel
- Pricing the Future: Finance, Physics and the 300-Year Journey to the Black–Scholes Equation – George Szpiro
- Physics on the Fringe: Smoke Rings, Circlons, and Alternative Theories of Everything – Margaret Wertheim

2013: Physics in Mind: a Quantum View of the Brain by the biophysicist Werner Loewenstein

- The Spark of Life: Electricity in the Human Body – Frances Ashcroft
- The Particle at the End of the Universe: How the Hunt for the Higgs Boson Leads Us to the Edge of a New World – Sean M. Carroll
- Hans Christian Ørsted: Reading Nature's Mind – Dan Charly Christensen
- Churchill's Bomb: a Hidden History of Science, War and Politics – Graham Farmelo
- Physics in Mind: a Quantum View of the Brain – Werner Loewenstein
- J Robert Oppenheimer: A Life Inside the Center – Ray Monk
- The Simpsons and their Mathematical Secrets – Simon Singh
- Time Reborn: From the Crisis in Physics to the Future of the Universe – Lee Smolin
- The Theoretical Minimum: What You Need to Know to Start Doing Physics – Leonard Susskind and George Hrabovsky
- Weird Life: the Search for Life That Is Very, Very Different from Our Own – David Toomey

2014: Stuff Matters: The Strange Stories of the Marvellous Materials that Shape our Man-made World - Mark Miodownik

- Wizards, Aliens & Starships: Physics and Math in Fantasy and Science Fiction - Charles Adler
- Serving the Reich: the Struggle for the Soul of Physics Under Hitler - Philip Ball
- Five Billion Years of Solitude: the Search for Life Among the Stars - Lee Billings
- Plutopia: Nuclear Families, Atomic Cities, and the Great Soviet and American Plutonium Disasters - Kate Brown
- Smashing Physics: Inside the World’s Biggest Experiment - Jon Butterworth
- Sonic Wonderland: a Scientific Odyssey of Sound - Trevor Cox
- The Perfect Theory: a Century of Geniuses and the Battle Over General Relativity - Pedro G Ferreira
- Stuff Matters: the Strange Stories of the Marvellous Materials that Shape Our Man-made World - Mark Miodownik
- Einstein and the Quantum: the Quest of the Valiant Swabian - Douglas Stone
- Island on Fire: the Extraordinary Story of Laki, the Volcano that Turned Eighteenth-century Europe - Dark Alexandra Witze and Jeff Kanipe

2015: Trespassing on Einstein’s Lawn: a Father, a Daughter, the Meaning of Nothing and the Beginning of Everything - Amanda Gefter

- Life on the Edge: the Coming of Age of Quantum Biology - Jim Al-Khalili and Johnjoe McFadden
- Physics on Your Feet: Ninety Minutes of Shame but a PhD for the Rest of Your Life - Dmitry Budker and Alexander Sushkov
- Half-Life: the Divided Life of Bruno Pontecorvo, Physicist or Spy - Frank Close
- Beyond: Our Future in Space - Chris Impey
- The Water Book: the Extraordinary Story of Our Most Ordinary Substance - Alok Jha
- Monsters: the Hindenburg Disaster and the Birth of Pathological Technology - Ed Regis
- Tunnel Visions: the Rise and Fall of the Superconducting Super Collider - Michael Riordan, Lillian Hoddeson, Adrienne Kolb
- The Copernicus Complex: the Quest for our Cosmic (In)Significance - Caleb Scharf
- Atoms Under the Floorboards: the Surprising Science Hidden in Your Home - Chris Woodford

2016: Why String Theory? - Joseph Conlon

- The Jazz of Physics: the Secret Link Between Music and the Structure of the Universe - Stephon Alexander
- Storm in a Teacup: the Physics of Everyday Life - Helen Czerski
- Big Science: Ernest Lawrence and the Invention that Launched the Military-Industrial Complex - Michael Hiltzik
- Strange Glow: the Story of Radiation - Timothy Jorgensen
- Cosmos: the Infographic Book of Space - Stuart Lowe and Chris North
- Spooky Action at a Distance: the Phenomenon that Reimagines Space and Time - George Musser
- Goldilocks and the Water Bears: the Search for Life in the Universe - Louisa Preston
- Reality Is Not What It Seems: the Journey to Quantum Gravity - Carlo Rovelli
- The Pope of Physics: Enrico Fermi and the Birth of the Atomic Age - Gino Segrè and Bettina Hoerlin

2017: Inferior: How Science Got Women Wrong and the New Research That’s Rewriting the Story - Angela Saini

- Marconi: the Man Who Networked the World by Marc Raboy
- Hidden Figures: the Untold Story of the African American Women Who Helped Win the Space Race by Margot Lee Shetterly
- The Glass Universe: How the Ladies of the Harvard Observatory Took the Measure of the Stars by Dava Sobel
- Scale: the Universal Laws of Life and Death in Organisms, Cities and Companies by Geoffrey West
- Not A Scientist: How Politicians Mistake, Misrepresent and Utterly Mangle Science by Dave Levitan
- Inferior: How Science Got Women Wrong and the New Research That’s Rewriting the Story by Angela Saini
- Mapping the Heavens: the Radical Scientific Ideas That Reveal the Cosmos by Priyamvada Natarajan
- We Have No Idea by Jorge Cham and Daniel Whiteson
- The Secret Science of Superheroes edited by Ed. Mark Lorch and Andy Miah
- The Death of Expertise: the Campaign Against Established Knowledge and Why it Matters by Tom Nichols

2018: Beyond Weird: Why Everything You Thought You Knew About Quantum Physics is Different - Philip Ball

- Treknology: the Science of Star Trek from Tricorders to Warp Drives by Ethan Siegel
- Ad Astra: an Illustrated Guide to Leaving the Planet by Dallas Campbell
- Exact Thinking in Demented Times: the Vienna Circle and the Epic Quest for the Foundations of Science by Karl Sigmund
- Beyond Weird: Why Everything You Thought You Knew About Quantum Physics is Different by Philip Ball
- The Order of Time by Carlo Rovelli
- Lost in Math: How Beauty Leads Physics Astray by Sabine Hossenfelder
- The Dialogues: Conversations About the Nature of the Universe by Clifford V Johnson
- When the Uncertainty Principle Goes to 11: Or How to Explain Quantum Physics with Heavy Metal by Philip Moriarty
- What is Real: the Unfinished Quest for the Meaning of Quantum Physics by Adam Becker
- Hello World: How to be Human in the Age of the Machine by Hannah Fry

2019: The Demon in the Machine: How Hidden Webs of Information are Solving the Mystery of Life - Paul Davies

- The Moon: a History for the Future by Oliver Morton
- The Case Against Reality: How Evolution Hid the Truth from Our Eyes by Donald D Hoffman
- Fire, Ice and Physics: the Science of Game of Thrones by Rebecca C Thompson
- Underland: A Deep Time Journey by Robert Macfarlane
- The Demon in the Machine: How Hidden Webs of Information are Solving the Mystery of Life by Paul Davies
- The Second Kind of Impossible: the Extraordinary Quest For A New Form of Matter by Paul J Steinhardt
- Superior: the Return of Race Science by Angela Saini
- Einstein’s Unfinished Revolution: the Search for What Lies Beyond the Quantum by Lee Smolin
- The Universe Speaks in Numbers: How Modern Maths Reveals Nature’s Deepest Secrets by Graham Farmelo
- Catching Stardust: Comets, Asteroids and the Birth of the Solar System by Natalie Starkey

== Pictures of the Year ==
Top 10 Favourite Pictures of the Year

2015:

- New Horizons uncovers Pluto's icy secrets
- Lasers reveal previously unseen fossil details
- Clap your eyes on the first 'images' of thunder
- Could lasers guide and control the path of lightning?
- Gravitational lensing creates 'Einstein's cross' of distant supernova
- Revealing the secret strength of a sea sponge
- Satellite sensor unexpectedly detects waves in upper atmosphere
- Balloon bursts approach the speed of sound
- Imaging the polarity of individual chemical bonds
- Organic microflowers bloom bright
