= Quintessence: The Search for Missing Mass in the Universe =

Book by Lawrence Krauss

- Softcover edition
- Author: Lawrence M. Krauss
- Language: English
- Subject: Physics, dark matter, cosmology
- Genre: Non-fiction
- Published: December 21, 2000
- Publisher: Basic Books
- Publication place: United States
- Media type: Print, e-book
- Pages: 384 pp.
- ISBN: 978-0465037414
- Preceded by: Beyond Star Trek
- Followed by: Atom

Quintessence: The Search for Missing Mass in the Universe is the fifth non-fiction book by the American theoretical physicist Lawrence M. Krauss. The book was published by Basic Books on December 21, 2000. This text is an update of his 1989 book The Fifth Essence. It was retitled Quintessence after the now widely accepted term for dark energy.

== Overview ==
Krauss focuses on theoretical physics and has published researches on a number of topics within that field. His primary contribution is to cosmology as one of the first physicists to suggest that most of the mass and energy of the universe resides in empty space, an idea now widely known as "dark energy". Furthermore, Krauss has formulated a model in which the universe could have potentially come from "nothing," as outlined in his later book A Universe from Nothing.

Whether our universe is ever-expanding depends on the amount and properties of matter, but there is too little visible matter around us to explain the behavior we can see—over 90% of the universe consists of the missing mass or dark matter, which Krauss termed "the fifth essence." In this book Krauss demonstrates how the dark matter problem is now connected with two widely discussed areas in the modern cosmology: the ultimate fate of the universe and the cosmological constant. He also discusses an antigravity force that may explain recent observations of a permanently expanding universe.

== See also ==
- Dark matter in fiction
- Exotic matter
- Mirror matter
- Negative mass
- Quintessence (physics)
- Scalar field dark matter
- Self-interacting dark matter
- Unparticle physics
- The 4 Percent Universe
