= The Unbelievers =

2013 film by Gus Holwerda

- Theatrical poster
- Directed by: Gus Holwerda
- Produced by: Lawrence Krauss; Gus Holwerda; Luke Holwerda; Jason Spisak
- Starring: Richard Dawkins; Lawrence Krauss
- Cinematography: Luke Holwerda
- Edited by: Gus Holwerda; Luke Holwerda
- Music by: Thomas Amason; Chris Henderson
- Production company: Black Chalk
- Release date: April 2013 (Hot Docs)
- Running time: 77 minutes
- Country: United States
- Language: English
- Box office: $14,400

The Unbelievers is a 2013 documentary film that follows Richard Dawkins and Lawrence Krauss as they speak publicly around the globe about the importance of science and reason in the modern world, encouraging others to cast off religious and politically motivated approaches toward what they think to be important current issues. The film includes short statements by influential people and celebrities such as Stephen Hawking, Ayaan Hirsi Ali, Sam Harris, Cameron Diaz, Woody Allen, Penn Jillette, Ian McEwan, and David Silverman. The film received mixed reviews from critics.

== Making of ==
"There is no through-line, we just wanted to show what it is like to be them".

— Luke Holwerda

Gus Holwerda came to know Lawrence Krauss via Christopher Hitchens and first met him at an Origins Symposium. Being at the event, which they viewed as a kind of Woodstock for science, Gus and Luke Holwerda conceived the idea of following Krauss around on his lectures and debates and documenting his venture in the style of a rock band tour movie.

The plan was not realized immediately, but Krauss approached the two when the Origins Symposium wanted to archive its events. The quality of their work with Origins eventually convinced him to go on with the movie project, which "fortuitously" began when Krauss and Richard Dawkins went on an Australian tour.

Gus and Luke Holwerda followed them around for 8 months and produced 120 hours of films. Each interview with the celebrities lasted an hour. Woody Allen, a friend of Lawrence Krauss, was the first celebrity interviewee.

== Release ==
The world premiere for The Unbelievers was on April 29, 2013 at Hot Docs Film Festival in Toronto, Ontario, and all four screenings of the film were sold out.

== Reception ==
The Unbelievers received mixed reviews. The review aggregation website Rotten Tomatoes reports that 44% of critics gave the film a positive review based on 9 reviews. Metacritic calculated a score of 32 based on 7 reviews.

The New York Times described the film as "too poorly made to entertain." Variety described it as a "superficial documentary" where "every moment is captured with the reverence of a fawning fan."

== Interviewees ==
The Unbelievers includes short statements by "celebrities and other influential people" who support the work of Dawkins and Krauss, including Ricky Gervais, Woody Allen, Cameron Diaz, Stephen Hawking, Sarah Silverman, Bill Pullman, Werner Herzog, Bill Maher, Stephen Colbert, Tim Minchin, Eddie Izzard, Ian McEwan, Adam Savage, Ayaan Hirsi Ali, Penn Jillette, Sam Harris, Daniel Dennett, James Randi, Cormac McCarthy, Paul Provenza, James Morrison, Michael Shermer, and David Silverman.
