= The Fifth Essence =

Book by Lawrence Krauss

- Paperback edition
- Author: Lawrence M. Krauss
- Language: English
- Subject: Physics; Science
- Genre: Popular science
- Publisher: Basic Books
- Publication date: 1989
- Publication place: United States
- Media type: Print, e-book
- Pages: 411 pp.
- ISBN: 978-0465023752
- Followed by: Fear of Physics: A Guide for the Perplexed

The Fifth Essence: The Search for the Dark Matter in the Universe is the debut book by the American physicist Lawrence M. Krauss, published in 1989. Krauss talks about dark matter and its importance to our understanding of the universe. The book also contains information about modern astrophysics and Greek philosophers. The book was later updated and re-released as Quintessence: The Search for Missing Mass in the Universe in 2000.
