= Knocking on Heaven's Door (book) =

Book by Lisa Randall

Knocking on Heaven’s Door: How Physics and Scientific Thinking Illuminate the Universe and the Modern World
- Hardcover edition
- Author: Lisa Randall
- Language: English
- Subject: Physics, cosmology
- Genre: Non-fiction
- Published: September 20, 2011
- Publisher: Ecco Press
- Publication place: United States
- Media type: Print, e-book, audiobook
- Pages: 464 pp.
- ISBN: 978-0061723728
- Preceded by: Warped Passages
- Followed by: Higgs Discovery

Knocking on Heaven’s Door: How Physics and Scientific Thinking Illuminate the Universe and the Modern World is the second non-fiction book by Lisa Randall. It was initially published on September 20, 2011, by Ecco Press. The title is explained in the text: "Scientists knock on heaven's door in an attempt to cross the threshold separating the known from the unknown."

== See also ==
- Higgs boson
- Higgs mechanism
