= Higgs Discovery =

2013 non-fiction book by Lisa Randall

Higgs Discovery: The Power of Empty Space
- Softcover edition
- Author: Lisa Randall
- Language: English
- Subject: Physics, cosmology
- Genre: Non-fiction
- Published: September 24, 2013
- Publisher: Ecco Press
- Publication place: United States
- Media type: Print, e-book, audiobook
- Pages: 112 pp.
- ISBN: 978-0062300478
- Preceded by: Knocking on Heaven’s Door
- Followed by: Dark Matter and the Dinosaurs

Higgs Discovery: The Power of Empty Space is a short non-fiction book by Lisa Randall, in which she concentrates on the ideas discussed in her two previous books. Higgs Discovery was initially published on September 24, 2013 by Ecco Press.

== Review ==
Lisa Randall is a well-known theoretical physicist, Professor at Harvard and author of two previous, chunkier popular books on particle physics, cosmology and their implications. This ebook contains extracts from those books but the main content is a thirty page account of the significance of the discovery and of her personal experience of it (listening to the seminar in a cafe on a Greek Island, doing an interview about it halfway up a rock face...). The style is informal and easygoing; the content is advanced. Randall goes beyond the poetic one-liners and beyond what any single news article could deliver in terms of explaining the significance of the discovery, how it was made, and what might come next. A lot of specialist terms are used, but most are introduced in a way which does not interfere with the impact of the narrative or the big picture Randall summarises. I think it will work well for non-specialists (certainly regular readers of this blog will have no worries).

—The Guardian

== See also ==
- Higgs boson
- Higgs mechanism
- Nothing
