= Shufang Su =

Chinese and American physicist

Shufang Su is a Chinese and American physicist. She is a professor of physics at the University of Arizona, where she heads the physics department. Her research focuses on theoretical high-energy particle physics beyond the Standard Model, both for ground-based experiments and in particle cosmology and the study of dark matter.

== Education and career ==
Su is originally from Zhenhai. She studied physics at the University of Science and Technology of China, graduating with a bachelor's degree in 1995, and then went to the Massachusetts Institute of Technology for doctoral study. She completed her Ph.D. in 2000, with the dissertation Search for Supersymmetry: New Physics beyond the Standard Model supervised by Lisa Randall.

She was a postdoctoral researcher and John A. McCone Fellow at the California Institute of Technology from 2000 until 2003, when she joined the University of Arizona as an assistant professor of physics. She was tenured there in 2009, and became department head in 2023.

At the University of Arizona, she was the founding president of the Faculty of Chinese Heritage Association. She has served in leadership roles for the American Physical Society (APS), including chairing its Four Corners Section and its Committee on Scientific Publications.

== Recognition ==
Su was named as a Fellow of the American Physical Society in 2014, after a nomination from the APS Division of Particles and Fields, "for her fundamental contributions to the phenomenology of Higgs bosons, dark matter, supersymmetry, and other physics beyond the Standard Model, which have stimulated and guided experimental search programs".
