= Atom (Krauss book) =

Book by Lawrence Krauss

Atom: An Odyssey from the Big Bang to Life on Earth...and Beyond
- Hardcover edition
- Author: Lawrence M. Krauss
- Language: English
- Subject: Physics
- Genre: Non-fiction
- Published: April 1, 2001
- Publisher: Little, Brown
- Publication place: United States
- Media type: Print, e-book
- Pages: 320 pp.
- Award: Science Writing Award (2002)
- ISBN: 978-0316499460
- Preceded by: Quintessence
- Followed by: Hiding in the Mirror

Atom: An Odyssey from the Big Bang to Life on Earth...and Beyond is the sixth non-fiction book by the American theoretical physicist Lawrence M. Krauss. The text was published on April 1, 2001 by Little, Brown. Krauss won the Science Writing Award (2002) for this book.

== Synopsis ==
In this book Krauss discusses creating parts of an oxygen atom, the primary atoms of the Big Bang. Then he follows it through the remaining history of the Universe. As time has been passing by, the atom was a part of a supernova and star dust, star and planet systems, and, ultimately, a part of living cells.

== Review ==
In his review Chris Lavers of The Guardian stated "Krauss weaves his cosmic story around the life of a single oxygen atom, from the time it was just a twinkle in the universe's eye to the eventual death of its constituent particles. This denouement may come to pass in some distant part of the cosmos long after we have all passed away, but, if we are really lucky, it may just happen in an enormous tank of minutely scrutinised water currently located down a mineshaft in Japan. If and when it does, physicists the world over will jump up and down with excitement, because they will have learned something truly profound. Exactly what would take too long to explain, which is a relief, because I'm not at all sure I understand it. Read the book and try for yourself... I am in a better position to judge Krauss's geology and biology, subjects he admits he had to learn from scratch before writing Atom. Not only has he mastered them, he often finds lyrical ways of explaining ideas in both fields. Indeed, the standard of writing in Atom is perhaps even higher than in his 1995 bestseller, The Physics of Star Trek."

== See also ==
- Atom: Journey Across the Subatomic Cosmos by Isaac Asimov
