= Atom (Asimov book) =

Book by Isaac Asimov

Atom: Journey Across the Subatomic Cosmos
- First edition
- Author: Isaac Asimov
- Language: English
- Subject: Physics
- Published: May 31, 1991
- Publisher: Dutton Adult
- Publication place: United States
- Media type: Print
- Pages: 319 pp.
- ISBN: 978-0525249900

Atom: Journey Across the Subatomic Cosmos is a non-fiction book by Isaac Asimov. It was initially published on May 31, 1991, by Dutton Adult.

== Overview ==
In it, Asimov presents the atom and subatomic particles in a historical context, beginning with Democritus's original thought experiments and theory of atomism, and ending with then-current knowledge of the fundamental particles.

== Contents ==
The book is separated into twelve chapters, plus the index.

Chapter	Subject
One	Matter
Two	Light
Three	Electrons
Four	Nuclei
Five	Isotopes
Six	Neutrons
Seven	Breakdowns
Eight	Antimatter
Nine	Neutrinos
Ten	Interactions
Eleven	Quarks
Twelve	The Universe

== See also ==
- Atom: An Odyssey from the Big Bang to Life on Earth...and Beyond by Lawrence Krauss
