= Intersect (2020 film) =

- Theatrical release poster
- Directed by: Gus Holwerda
- Screenplay by: Gus Holwerda
- Produced by: Gus Holwerda, Luke Holwerda, Jason Spisak
- Cinematography: Luke Holwerda
- Music by: Peter McConnell
- Production companies: Black Chalk, Shirley Films
- Distributed by: 1091 Pictures, Tubi TV
- Release date: 12 February 2020 (Boston SciFi Film Festival)
- Running time: 119 minutes
- Country: United States
- Language: English
- Budget: $1,500,000

Intersect is a 2020 American thriller film written and directed by Gus Holwerda. The film premiered at the Boston SciFi Film Festival on 12 February 2020 and concentrates on the adventures of young scientists who invented a time machine. This is the debut feature film for Holwerda.

== Plot ==
Ryan Winrich (Jason Spisak) is part of a team of young physicists at the Miskatonic University. The group conducts advanced research into creating the ability for humans to send physical objects through time. After initial success, their teammate Nate decides in a drunken stupor to test the system on himself. Transporting himself through the time portal, killing himself in the process. Gradually, Ryan starts realizing that the current events may somehow be related to the mysterious happenings in his childhood when he saw strange creatures whom nobody else could. Later, it turns out that the scientists were carefully manipulated by invisible and sinister forces from other dimensions.

== Cast ==
- James Morrison as Bill Marshall
- Richard Dawkins as Q42 / Computer
- Jason Spisak as Ryan Winrich
- Lawrence Krauss as Professor
- Abe Ruthless as Nate Beaumont
- Leeann Dearing as Caitlin Webb
- Jose Rosete as Abner Rosen
- Dartagnan Driscoll as Young Ryan
- Kelcey Bligh as Young Caitlin
- Ryan Adelson as Young Nate
- Jacob Lacy as Young Abner

== Reception ==
Jake Dee writing for JoBlo stated, "All told, INTERSECT takes far too long to arrive at its intended destination, failing to deliver enough spookiness and authentic intrigue along the way, while suffering from a slew of amateurish first-time filmmaker choices at every turn. The film wants to be a time-bending, mysterious sci-fi/horror outing in the vein of H.G. Wells and H.P. Lovecraft, but also wants to be anti-bullying homily, anti-religious screed, and worse yet, a TV-level melodrama that, when all cobbled into one presentation, feels like a jumbled mess. The suboptimal performances and technical inferiority of the low-budget production don’t help matters any. That said, I do want to see what Holwerda has up his sleeve provided he hit the set next time out with a more focused screenplay."

James Tucker of Rue Morgue commented, "INTERSECT becomes a lot less challenging when you realize the film is essentially moving backwards, starting from a point close to the end and then cycling back through each major stage of the protagonist’s life... The pieces are eventually drawn together into a satisfying whole, but when the puzzle is solved you feel more relieved than elated; finally, after slogging through the past we have caught up to the present. It is a satisfying reveal with a compelling character arc for at least ONE of the three main characters, and the film’s open-ended ending will certainly inspire conversations about what the hell it all meant; I just wish it wasn’t such a slog to get there."

Hunter Lanier of Film Threat added, "While there’s nothing wrong with the broad strokes of Intersect, the way in which it’s told prevents anything from gaining traction. They might be able to time travel, but the characters aren’t able to enter the third dimension. Much of the story’s connective tissue is made up of sentimental developments that try too hard to hit their mark. Choosing to eschew the normal time travel conventions for a character-based movie—while retaining the sci-fi intrigue—was a valiant choice, but one that required more tending than was given."
