= Fear of Physics =

Book by Lawrence Krauss

Fear of Physics: A Guide for the Perplexed
- Hardcover edition
- Author: Lawrence M. Krauss
- Language: English
- Subject: Physics; Science
- Genre: Popular science
- Publisher: Basic Books
- Publication date: 1994
- Publication place: United States
- Media type: Print, e-book
- ISBN: 978-0465002184
- Preceded by: The Fifth Essence
- Followed by: The Physics of Star Trek

Fear of Physics: A Guide for the Perplexed is the second non-fiction book by the American physicist Lawrence M. Krauss. It was published in 1994 by Basic Books. The book contains many anecdotes and examples.

== Reception ==
A reviewer of Publishers Weekly stated " The accomplishments and views of such giants of modern physics as Einstein, Feynman and Heisenberg are used to illustrate the inventiveness required of those in the field. While Krauss acknowledges that this is a limited selection of ideas--the "hidden realities" of physics, not its stuff--he nonetheless serves quantum mechanics well. Also well-served are the interests of the general reader as Krauss, persistently hewing to the basics, never falls into patronization or catchy metaphor. Supplemented by Larry Gonick and Art Huffman's The Cartoon Guide to Physics, this is a primer on the wonders of physics." A review by Kirkus commented, "Physics made easy this is not. Physics for the sophisticated but nontechnical, maybe. Krauss is a theoretical physicist who teaches one of those physics-for-poets courses at Yale. This volume, though, is a lofty view of certain unifying themes with particular reference to particle physics and quantum mechanics."
