= Dark Matter and the Dinosaurs =

2015 non-fiction book by Harvard astrophysicist Lisa Randall

Dark Matter and the Dinosaurs: The Astounding Interconnectedness of the Universe
- Hardcover edition
- Author: Lisa Randall
- Language: English
- Subject: Cosmology
- Genre: Non-fiction
- Publisher: HarperCollins: Ecco Press
- Publication date: 27 October 2015 (Hardcover)
- Publication place: United States
- ISBN: 978-0-06-232847-2 (Hardcover)
- Preceded by: Higgs Discovery

Dark Matter and the Dinosaurs: The Astounding Interconnectedness of the Universe is a 2015 non-fiction book by Harvard astrophysicist Lisa Randall. Randall conjectures that dark matter may have indirectly led to the extinction of non-avian dinosaurs. Other scientists generally regard this as a credible hypothesis but note a lack of supporting evidence. The book itself was well reviewed.

== Overview ==
Randall hypothesizes a plane of dark matter exists roughly on the plane of the Milky Way galaxy. As the Sun oscillates in its orbit around the center of the galaxy, it passes through the dark matter. The resulting gravitational disturbances destabilize bodies in the Oort cloud, resulting in increased Earth impacts, such as the one that caused the Cretaceous–Paleogene extinction event resulting in the extinction of non-avian dinosaurs. Formation of a plane requires that a fraction of the dark matter have different properties than the bulk of it, described by Randall as "dissipative dark matter" in a paper co-authored with Harvard physics professor Matthew Reece. Randall's hypothesis is similar to the Nemesis theory, which postulates that a currently unseen brown dwarf star orbiting the Sun is the cause of the periodic impacts.

=== Criticism ===
Astrophysicist Coryn Bailer-Jones of the Max Planck Institute for Astronomy and physicist Adrian Melott question the statistical analysis used to determine the periodicity of impacts, with Jones also noting impacts could be from asteroids rather than objects originating in the Oort cloud. Physicist Konstantinos Dimopoulos offers that a proposal from a world-renowned cosmologist is certainly credible, but notes the "need to make dark matter weirder than it already is" violates Occam's razor. Randall rebuts such criticism by noting that it could be "simpler to say that dark matter is like our matter, in that it's different particles with different forces", adding "the other answer is that the world's complicated, so Occam's razor isn't always the best way to go about things."

== Critical reception ==
Jim Al-Khalili, in a review published in The Wall Street Journal, describes the book as "a cracking read, combining storytelling of the highest order with a trove of information" on the underlying science. Film critic Joe Morgenstern, in a review of film The Good Dinosaur, says the book is a "splendid source" regarding dinosaur extinction, saying it "ranges far and eloquently through our current knowledge of the universe". Maria Popova, writing for The New York Times, was less enthusiastic, saying while Randall is not one of the few "working scientists who are also enchanting writers", she is "an excellent explainer" with an "infectious" affection for the subject matter. Popova notes the idea, due to a lack of confirming physical evidence, is "essentially a thought experiment", and that the book's "greatest reward" is actually "the gift of perspective".

== See also ==
- Nemesis (hypothetical star)
