= Csaba Csáki =

Hungarian physicist

Csaba Csaki
- Education: Massachusetts Institute of Technology
- Scientific career
- Fields: Physicist
- Workplaces: Cornell University
- Doctoral advisor: Lisa Randall

Csaba Csáki is a Hungarian theoretical physicist who studied under Lisa Randall at the MIT Center for Theoretical Physics. He is known for his work in models of extra dimensions and supersymmetry. He is currently a professor at Cornell University. He was granted fellowship by the American Physical Society in 2016.
