= Quantum Man: Richard Feynman's Life in Science =

Book by Lawrence Krauss

- Hardcover edition
- Author: Lawrence M. Krauss
- Language: English
- Subject: Richard Feynman, physics
- Genre: Non-fiction
- Published: March 21, 2011
- Publisher: W. W. Norton & Company
- Publication place: United States
- Media type: Print, e-book
- Pages: 368 pp.
- ISBN: 978-0393064711
- Preceded by: Hiding in the Mirror
- Followed by: A Universe from Nothing

Quantum Man: Richard Feynman's Life in Science is the eighth non-fiction book by the American theoretical physicist Lawrence M. Krauss. The text was initially published on March 21, 2011 by W. W. Norton & Company. Physics World chose the book as Book of the Year 2011. In this book, Krauss concentrates on the scientific biography of the physicist Richard Feynman.

== Review ==
Armed with material like this, any biography is going to be an attractive proposition, and Quantum Man certainly has no shortage of intriguing anecdotes and insights. We get a feel for the ebullience, as well as the maddening irreverence, that defined his character. The problem is that Krauss – also a theoretical physicist – concentrates a little too heavily on the science, rather than the life, of Richard Feynman. He seems overly concerned that his subject's antics might distract readers from fully appreciating quantum physics, an arcane world that Feynman ruled but which baffles most others. As a result, we are presented with pages and pages on the minutiae of electron interactions and photon exchanges at the expense of any human interest. The result is a book that strains to do intellectual justice to Feynman the scientist but leaves him short-changed as a rounded personality.

—The Guardian
