= Adam Becker =

American astrophysicist and author (born 1984)

- Born: 1984 (age 41–42); New Jersey, United States
- Education: Cornell University, University of Michigan
- Known for: What Is Real (2018)
- Awards: Alfred P. Sloan Foundation Grant
- Scientific career
- Fields: Astrophysics and Philosophy
- Thesis: Is the Universe Normal? Constraining Scale-Dependent Primordial Non-Gaussianity. (2012)
- Doctoral advisor: Dragan Huterer
- Website: freelanceastrophysicist.com

Adam Michael Becker (born 1984) is an American astrophysicist, author, and scientific philosopher. His works include the book What Is Real?, published by Basic Books, which explores the history and personalities surrounding the development and evolution of the field of quantum physics, and includes a modern assessment of the Copenhagen Interpretation.

== Academic background ==
In 2006, Becker received a Bachelor of Arts (B.A.) degree in philosophy and physics from Cornell University and earned a Master of Science degree in physics from the University of Michigan a year later. In 2012, Becker would go on to receive a Doctor of Philosophy (Ph.D.) degree in physics from the University of Michigan with the physicist Dragan Huterer as his doctoral advisor. His doctoral thesis concerned primordial non-Gaussianity, which he would later summarize in lay terms for his readers, declaring "I was trying to find out how much we can learn about the way stuff was arranged in the early universe by looking at the way stuff is arranged in the universe right now."

== Career ==
After completing his doctoral program, Becker wrote and lectured on scientific concepts, providing lay-friendly professional commentary on science.

Becker has written for several news and periodicals concerning science for the interested layperson, including the BBC (which culminated in a video series), NPR, New Scientist, Scientific American, The New York Times, Aeon, and the global educational program NOVA on PBS.

In 2014, while employed at the Public Library of Science (PLOS), Becker was a lead developer in a project that produced Rich Citations, which were an extensive expansion to the capabilities of digital cross-referencing across the PLOS platform.

In 2018, after publishing What Is Real?, Becker was appointed as a visiting scholar at the Office for History of Science and Technology at the University of California, Berkeley. In 2020 he accepted a position as a visiting researcher in the Department of Logic and Philosophy of Science, at University of California, Irvine.

Becker has also been a member of the California Quantum Interpretation Network, "a research collaboration among faculty and staff at multiple UC campuses and other universities across California, focusing on the interpretation of quantum physics."

Becker's second book, published in 2025, More Everything Forever, subtitled "AI Overlords, Space Empires, and Silicon Valley's Crusade to Control the Fate of Humanity", examines the relationship between science and the consumer technology industry that has developed and spread globally from California's Silicon Valley. In her review for The New York Times, Jennifer Szalai called the book "smart and wonderfully readable".

== Personal Life ==
Adam Becker has a cat named Babka.

== Selected publications ==
Books

- What is Real?: The Unfinished Quest for the Meaning of Quantum Physics. New York, NY: Basic Books. March 20, 2018. ISBN 978-0-465-09605-3. OCLC 1015259283.
- More Everything Forever. New York, NY: Basic Books. April 22, 2025. ISBN 978-1-541-61959-3.

Articles and websites

- Becker, Adam (February 5, 2019). "From Black Holes to Breakfast, Three Books Show How Einstein's Legacy Lives On". The New York Times. ISSN 0362-4331.
- Becker, Adam, "The Big Questions", BBC Reel, BBC (BBC animated video series)
- Becker, Adam. "Why does time always run forwards and never backwards?". BBC.
- Becker, Adam. "'Light Of The Stars' Looks To Other Planets To Illuminate Climate Change On Earth". NPR.org.
- Becker, Adam. "The Difficult Birth of the "Many Worlds" Interpretation of Quantum Mechanics". Scientific American Blog Network.
- Becker, Adam (March 28, 2018). "Quantum Gambling and the Nature of Reality". www.pbs.org.
- Becker, Adam (January 28, 2019). "Junk Science or the Real Thing? 'Inference' Publishes Both". Undark Magazine.
- Becker, Adam (July 21, 2021). "One Lab's Quest to Build Space-Time Out of Quantum Particles". Quanta Magazine.
- Becker, Adam (February 1, 2022). "What Is Spacetime Really Made Of?". Scientific American.
