= A Universe from Nothing =

2012 science book by Lawrence Krauss

A Universe from Nothing: Why There Is Something Rather than Nothing
- Softcover edition
- Author: Lawrence M. Krauss
- Language: English
- Subject: Physics; Cosmology
- Publisher: Free Press
- Publication date: January 10, 2012
- Publication place: United States
- Media type: Print (hardcover and softcover), e-book
- Pages: 224 pp
- ISBN: 978-1-4516-2445-8
- Dewey Decimal: 523.1/8
- LC Class: QB981 .K773 2012
- Preceded by: Quantum Man
- Followed by: The Greatest Story Ever Told—So Far

A Universe from Nothing: Why There Is Something Rather than Nothing is a popular science book by physicist Lawrence M. Krauss. Published by Free Press in January 2012, the book discusses modern cosmogony and its implications for the debate about the existence of God. Krauss describes recent advances in the understanding of quantum gravity and quantum fluctuations, and how they make it possible for universes to "spontaneously appear from nothing". In the Epilogue, he summarizes his main assertion: "[W]e have discovered that all signs suggest a universe that could and plausibly did arise from a deeper nothing—involving the absence of space itself and—which may one day return to nothing via processes that may not only be comprehensible but also processes that do not require any external control or direction." Critics of the book faulted Krauss for using the term "nothing" in a misleading way that does not answer key questions.

== Publication ==
While writing the book, Krauss expanded material from a lecture on the cosmological implications of a flat expanding universe, which he delivered to the Richard Dawkins Foundation at the 2009 Atheist Alliance International conference. Shortly before his death, Christopher Hitchens agreed to contribute a foreword for the book, but then became too ill to complete it. The afterword by Richard Dawkins compares the importance of A Universe from Nothing to that of Charles Darwin's On the Origin of Species—a comparison that Krauss later called "pretentious" since his work "doesn't come close to The Origin of Species, which is one of the greatest scientific works ever produced."

A Universe from Nothing appeared on The New York Times bestseller list on January 29, 2012.

== Reception ==
=== Praise ===
Caleb Scharf, writing in Nature, said that "it would be easy for this remarkable story to revel in self-congratulation, but Krauss steers it soberly and with grace".

Ray Jayawardhana, Canada Research Chair in observational astrophysics at the University of Toronto, wrote for The Globe and Mail that Krauss "delivers a spirited, fast-paced romp through modern cosmology and its strong underpinnings in astronomical observations and particle physics theory" and that he "makes a persuasive case that the ultimate question of cosmic origin – how something, namely the universe, could arise from nothing – belongs in the realm of science rather than theology or philosophy".

Prominent atheists such as Dawkins and Sam Harris applauded A Universe from Nothing for refuting, in their view, the First Cause argument for God's existence. Harris called it "a brilliant and disarming book" that "has a lot to do with nothing—and nothing to do with God." In the afterword, Dawkins wrote, "Even the last remaining trump card of the theologian, 'Why is there something rather than nothing?' shrivels up before your eyes as you read these pages. If On the Origin of Species was biology's deadliest blow to supernaturalism, we may come to see A Universe from Nothing as the equivalent from cosmology."

In New Scientist, Michael Brooks wrote, "Krauss will be preaching only to the converted. That said, we should be happy to be preached to so intelligently. The same can't be said about the Dawkins afterword, which is both superfluous and silly."

=== Critique ===
George Ellis, in an interview in Scientific American, said that "Krauss does not address why the laws of physics exist, why they have the form they have, or in what kind of manifestation they existed before the universe existed (which he must believe if he believes they brought the universe into existence). Who or what dreamt up symmetry principles, Lagrangians, specific symmetry groups, gauge theories, and so on? He does not begin to answer these questions." He criticized the philosophical viewpoint of the book, saying "It's very ironic when he says philosophy is bunk and then himself engages in this kind of attempt at philosophy."

In The New York Times, philosopher of science and physicist David Albert claimed that the book failed to live up to its title. He said Krauss dismissed concerns about what Albert calls a misuse of the term "nothing", since if matter comes from relativistic quantum fields, it begs the question, where did those fields come from, which Krauss does not discuss. Albert's critique was reported on in multiple venues.

Commenting on the philosophical debate sparked by the book, the physicist Sean M. Carroll asked: "Do advances in modern physics and cosmology help us address these underlying questions, of why there is something called the universe at all, and why there are things called 'the laws of physics,' and why those laws seem to take the form of quantum mechanics, and why some particular wave function and Hamiltonian? In a word: no. I don't see how they could."

== See also ==
- Problem of why there is anything at all
