= Non-Gaussianity =

In physics, a non-Gaussianity is the correction that modifies the expected Gaussian function estimate for the measurement of a physical quantity.

In physical cosmology, the fluctuations of the cosmic microwave background are known to be approximately Gaussian, both theoretically as well as experimentally. However, most theories predict some level of non-Gaussianity in the primordial density field. Detection of these non-Gaussian signatures will allow discrimination between various models of inflation and their alternatives.
