= Five Billion Years of Solitude =

Book by Lee Billings

Five Billion Years of Solitude: The Search for Life Among the Stars
- First edition cover
- Author: Lee Billings
- Language: English
- Subject: Science, Astronomy
- Genre: Nonfiction
- Publisher: Current, a member of Penguin Group
- Publication date: October 3, 2013
- Publication place: United States
- Media type: Print, e-book, audiobook
- Pages: 304 pp.
- ISBN: 978-1617230066

Five Billion Years of Solitude: The Search for Life Among the Stars is a nonfiction work by the science author Lee Billings. The text was initially published on October 3, 2013 by Current. The paperback version was published on October 28, 2014.

== Overview ==
In this book, Billings explores the scientists and science behind the ever-expanding universe of exoplanets. Since the first detection of a planet orbiting another Sun-like star in 1995, scientists have discovered an increasing number of worlds beyond the Solar System through detections by telescopes and spacecraft. Billings reveals the scientists behind these discoveries and their thoughts on not only exoplanets, but also their triumphs and frustrations in their quest to solve one of the greatest mysteries of humankind: Are we alone? Billings includes interviews with Frank Drake, Geoffrey Marcy, Greg Laughlin, James Kasting, Matt Mountain, Wesley Traub, Sara Seager, and many other prominent researchers.

== Topics covered ==
The book has 10 chapters:

- Looking for Longevity
- Drake's Orchids
- A Fractured Empire
- The Worth of a World
- After the Gold Rush
- The Big Picture
- Out of Equilibrium
- Aberrations of the Light
- The Order of the Null
- Into the Barren Lands

== Reviews ==
- Overbye, Dennis (8 November 2013). "Lonely Planet". Sunday Book Review. The New York Times.
- Brown, Mike (15 November 2013). "Five Billion Years of Solitude: The Search for Life Among the Stars by Lee Billings". The Washington Post.
- Henderson, Caspar (21 November 2013). "Five Billion Years of Solitude: The Search for Life Among the Stars – review". The Guardian.
- Teitel, Amy Shira (14 October 2013). "Lee Billings' Five Billion Years of Solitude (Review)". Discovery News Book Reviews. Discovery News.
- Kuchner, Marc (12 December 2014). "Five Billion Years of Solitude: The Search for Life Among the Stars". Physics Today. 67 (12): 59. Bibcode:2014PhT....67l..59K. doi:10.1063/PT.3.2626.

== See also ==
- The Science of Interstellar
