= Lisa Randall =

American theoretical physicist (b. 1962)

Lisa Randall HonFInstP
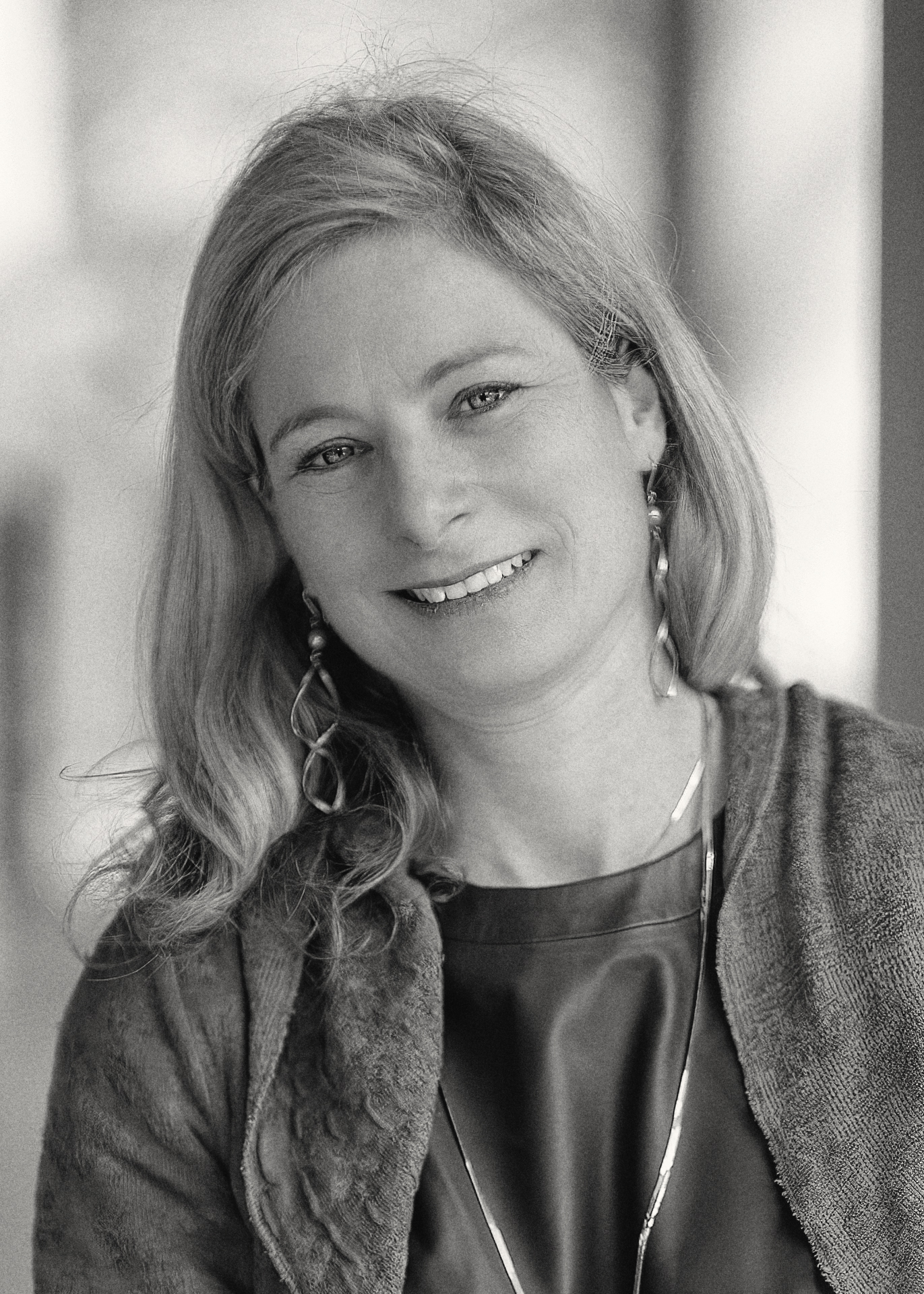
- Randall in 2015
- Born: June 18, 1962 (age 64); New York City, U.S.
- Education: Harvard University
- Known for: Randall–Sundrum model Warped Passages (2005)
- Relatives: Dana Randall (sister)
- Awards: Klopsteg Memorial Award (2006); Lilienfeld Prize (2007); Andrew Gemant Award (2012); Sakurai Prize (2019); Oskar Klein Medal (2019)
- Scientific career
- Fields: Theoretical physics
- Workplaces: Lawrence Berkeley Laboratory; University of California, Berkeley; Princeton University; Massachusetts Institute of Technology; Harvard University
- Doctoral advisor: Howard Georgi
- Doctoral students: Csaba Csáki; Shufang Su

Lisa Joy Randall (born June 18, 1962) is an American theoretical physicist and Frank B. Baird, Jr. Professor of Science at Harvard University. Her research includes the fundamental forces of nature and dimensions of space. She studies the Standard Model, supersymmetry, possible solutions to the hierarchy problem concerning the relative weakness of gravity, cosmology of dimensions, baryogenesis, cosmological inflation, and dark matter. She co-developed the Randall–Sundrum model, first published in 1999 with Raman Sundrum.

== Early life and education ==
Randall was born in Queens, New York City, New York. She graduated from Stuyvesant High School in 1980, where she was a classmate of fellow physicist and science popularizer Brian Greene. She won first place in the 1980 Westinghouse Science Talent Search at the age of 18 and was also named a National Merit Scholar. She attended Harvard University, where she took Math 55, earned a BA in physics in 1983 and a PhD in theoretical particle physics in 1987 under Howard Georgi.

== Work ==
Randall researches particle physics and cosmology at Harvard, where she is a professor of theoretical physics. Her research concerns elementary particles and fundamental forces, and has involved the study of a wide variety of models, the most recent involving dimensions. She has also worked on supersymmetry, Standard Model observables, cosmological inflation, baryogenesis, grand unified theories, and general relativity.

After her graduate work at Harvard, Randall held professorships at MIT and Princeton University before returning to Harvard in 2001. Professor Randall was the first tenured woman in the Princeton physics department and the first tenured female theoretical physicist at Harvard. (Melissa Franklin was the first tenured woman in the Harvard physics department.)

=== Writing and science popularization ===
Randall's books Warped Passages: Unraveling the Mysteries of the Universe's Hidden Dimensions and Knocking on Heaven’s Door: How Physics and Scientific Thinking Illuminate the Universe and the Modern World have both been on New York Times 100 notable books lists.

Between the hardback and paperback release of Knocking on Heaven's Door, the quest for the discovery of the Higgs boson was actually completed, a subject discussed in the book. Scientists at the Large Hadron Collider found a particle identified as the Higgs boson. She said about the discovery, that even if people don't understand everything about it, "what an exciting thing it is that people are excited that there is something fundamentally new that has been discovered." Randall has an e-book entitled Higgs Discovery: The Power of Empty Space. Before the Large Hadron Collider was operating, she wrote an article explaining the discoveries that were expected from using it. She was commonly asked about the misconception that the LHC could make black holes that could destroy the planet. She answered that it was "not even conceivable unless space and gravity are very different from what we thought."

Randall wrote the libretto of the opera Hypermusic Prologue: A Projective Opera in Seven Planes on the invitation of the composer, Hèctor Parra, who was inspired by her book Warped Passages.

=== Association with Jeffrey Epstein ===
Randall maintained multiple years of contact with financier and later convicted sex criminal Jeffrey Epstein, beginning in 2004, and continued after his 2008 conviction. She was first introduced to Epstein by John Brockman while considering leaving the Harvard Physics department and looking for advice on choosing between other universities. In emails between the two contained in the Epstein files released by the Department of Justice, Randall joked with Epstein about his house arrest, stating "Wow haven’t you had enough house arrest?", which he was placed under after his conviction for soliciting sex with a minor in 2008, as well as Randall's lack of "Jew credit." Randall also visited Epstein's private Caribbean island and flew on his private jet in 2014. When asked to respond to Nature's request for comments, she declined. In a statement to the Harvard Crimson, Randall did not address flying on Epstein’s jet in 2014 and stated that "Epstein was often in touch with the scientific community", but expressed that she "deeply regrets maintaining contact [with him]".

== Professional organizations ==
Randall is a fellow of the American Physical Society (2003) and a member of the American Academy of Arts and Sciences (2004), the National Academy of Sciences (2008), and the American Philosophical Society (2010).

Randall has helped organize numerous conferences and has been on the editorial board of several major theoretical physics journals.

== Awards and honors ==
In autumn 2004, she was the most cited theoretical physicist of the previous five years. Randall was featured in Seed magazine's "2005 Year in Science Icons" and in Newsweek's "Who's Next in 2006" as "one of the most promising theoretical physicists of her generation". In 2007, Randall was named one of Time magazine's 100 Most Influential People (Time 100) under the section for "Scientists & Thinkers". Randall was given this honor for her work in theoretical physics.

Other honors:

- J.J. Sakurai Prize for Theoretical Particle Physics 2019
- Andrew Gemant Award, 2012
- Golden Plate Award of the American Academy of Achievement, 2008
- Lilienfeld Prize, 2007
- E. A. Wood Science Writing Award, 2007
- Klopsteg Memorial Award from the American Association of Physics Teachers (AAPT), 2006
- Premio Caterina Tomassoni e Felice Pietro Chisesi, from the Sapienza University of Rome, 2003
- National Science Foundation Young Investigator Award, 1992

== Personal life ==
Randall's sister, Dana Randall, is a professor of computer science at Georgia Tech.

Randall is an avid climber. A rockface along the Mill Creek near Dumont in Colorado, is named Lisa Randall Wall after her by a local climbing society. In a climbing accident, after falling from the cliff despite proper safety measures, she injured her heel.

=== Religious beliefs ===
When asked whether she believes in God, Randall said:

"... I probably don't believe in God. I think it's a problem that people are considered immoral if they're not religious. That's just not true. This might earn me some enemies, but in some ways they may be even more moral. If you do something for a religious reason, you do it because you'll be rewarded in an afterlife or in this world. That's not quite as good as something you do for purely generous reasons."

== Bibliography ==
- Randall, Lisa (2005). Warped Passages: Unraveling the Mysteries of the Universe's Hidden Dimensions. Ecco Press. ISBN 0-06-053108-8.
- Randall, Lisa (2011). Knocking on Heaven's Door: How Physics and Scientific Thinking Illuminate the Universe and the Modern World. Ecco Press. ISBN 978-0-06-172372-8.
- Randall, Lisa (2013). Higgs Discovery: The Power of Empty Space. Ecco Press. ISBN 978-0062300478.
- Randall, Lisa (2015). Dark Matter and the Dinosaurs: The Astounding Interconnectedness of the Universe. Ecco Press. ISBN 978-0-06-232847-2.
