= Lawrence Krauss =

American particle physicist and cosmologist (born 1954)

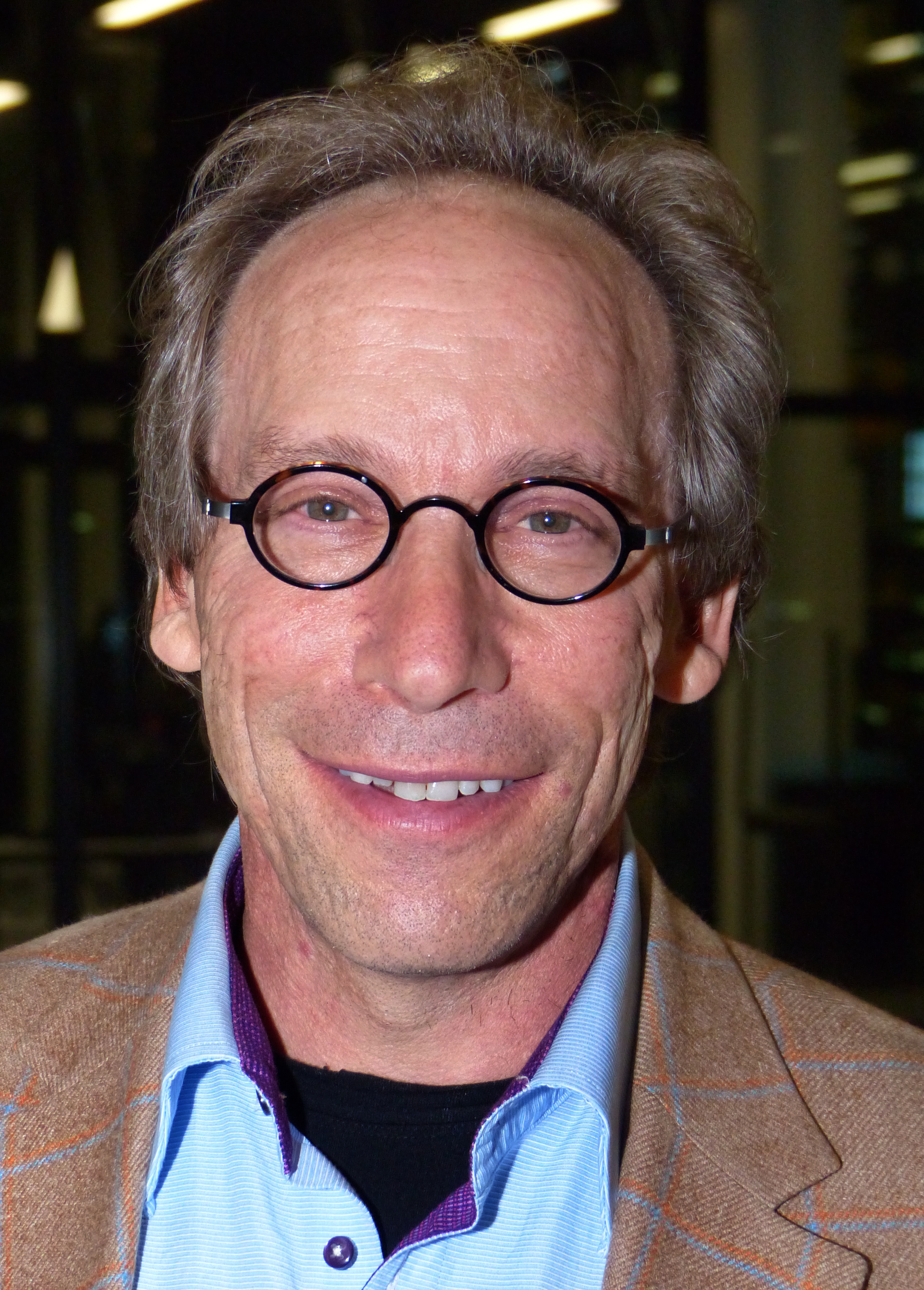
- Krauss at Ghent University in 2013
- Born: Lawrence Maxwell Krauss; May 27, 1954 (age 72); New York City, U.S.
- Education: Carleton University; Massachusetts Institute of Technology
- Known for: Dark energy; Zero-energy states
- Spouses: Katherine Kelley (m. 1980; div. 2012); Nancy Dahl (m. 2014)
- Awards: Andrew Gemant Award (2001); Lilienfeld Prize (2001); Science Writing Award (2002); Oersted Medal (2004); Richard Dawkins Award (2016)
- Scientific career
- Fields: Theoretical physics; Cosmology
- Workplaces: Arizona State University; Australian National University; New College of the Humanities; Yale University; Case Western Reserve University; Harvard University
- Thesis: Gravitation and Phase Transitions in the Early Universe (1982)
- Doctoral advisor: Roscoe Giles
- Lawrence Krauss Voice recorded in March 2017
- Website: www.lawrencemkrauss.com

Lawrence Maxwell Krauss (born May 27, 1954) is a Canadian-American theoretical physicist and cosmologist who taught at Arizona State University (ASU), Yale University, and Case Western Reserve University. He founded ASU's Origins Project in 2008 to investigate fundamental questions about the universe and served as the project's director.

Krauss is an advocate for public understanding of science. An anti-theist, Krauss seeks to reduce the influence of what he regards as superstition and religious dogma in popular culture. Krauss is the author of several bestselling books, including The Physics of Star Trek (1995) and A Universe from Nothing (2012), and chaired the Bulletin of the Atomic Scientists Board of Sponsors.

Upon investigating allegations about sexual misconduct by Krauss, ASU determined that Krauss had violated university policy, and did not renew his directorship of ASU's Origins Project for a third term in July 2018. Krauss retired as a professor at ASU in May 2019, at the end of the following academic year. He is President of The Origins Project Foundation, Inc. (a new organization, founded in 2019). Krauss hosts The Origins Podcast with Lawrence Krauss and publishes a blog titled Critical Mass.

Krauss has faced scrutiny for his association with child sex offender Jeffrey Epstein. He organized a 2006 physics conference funded by an Epstein foundation and received funding from Epstein for an academic project. He also publicly defended Epstein after his 2008 conviction and maintained correspondence and social contact with him over many years.

== Early life and education ==
Krauss was born on May 27, 1954, in New York City, but spent his childhood in Toronto. He was raised in a household that was Jewish but not religious. Krauss received undergraduate degrees in mathematics and physics with first-class honours at Carleton University in Ottawa in 1977, and was awarded a Ph.D. in physics at the Massachusetts Institute of Technology in 1982.

== Career ==
After some time in the Harvard Society of Fellows, Krauss became an assistant professor at Yale University in 1985 and associate professor in 1988. He left Yale for Case Western Reserve University in 1993 when he was named the Ambrose Swasey Professor of Physics, professor of astronomy, and chairman of the physics department until 2005. In 2006, Krauss led the initiative for the no-confidence vote against Case Western Reserve University's president Edward M. Hundert and provost John L. Anderson by the College of Arts and Sciences faculty. On March 2, 2006, both no-confidence votes were carried: 131–44 against Hundert and 97–68 against Anderson.

In August 2008, Krauss joined the faculty at Arizona State University as a foundation Professor in the School of Earth and Space Exploration at the Department of Physics in the College of Liberal Arts and Sciences. He also became the director of the Origins Project, a university initiative "created to explore humankind's most fundamental questions about our origins". In 2009, he helped inaugurate this initiative at the Origins Symposium, in which eighty scientists participated and three thousand people attended.

Krauss appears in the media both at home and abroad to facilitate public outreach in science. He has also written editorials for The New York Times. As a result of his appearance in 2002 before the state school board of Ohio, his opposition to intelligent design has gained national prominence.

Krauss attended and was a speaker at the Beyond Belief symposia in November 2006 and October 2008. He served on the science policy committee for Barack Obama's first (2008) presidential campaign and, also in 2008, was named co-president of the board of sponsors of the Bulletin of the Atomic Scientists. In 2010, he was elected to the board of directors of the Federation of American Scientists, and in June 2011, he joined the professoriate of the New College of the Humanities, a private college in London. In 2013, he accepted a part-time professorship at the Research School of Astronomy and Astrophysics in the physics department of the Australian National University.

Krauss is a critic of string theory, which he discusses in his 2005 book Hiding in the Mirror. In his 2012 book A Universe from Nothing Krauss says about string theory "we still have no idea if this remarkable theoretical edifice actually has anything to do with the real world". Released in March 2011, another book titled Quantum Man: Richard Feynman's Life in Science, while A Universe from Nothing—with an afterword by Richard Dawkins—was released in January 2012, and became a New York Times bestseller within a week. Originally, its foreword was to have been written by Christopher Hitchens, but Hitchens grew too ill to complete it. The paperback version of the book appeared in January 2013 with a new question-and-answer section and a preface integrating the 2012 discovery of the Higgs boson at the Large Hadron Collider. On March 21, 2017, his newest book, The Greatest Story Ever Told—So Far: Why Are We Here? was released in hardcover, paperback, and audio version.

A July 2012 article in Newsweek, written by Krauss, indicates how the Higgs particle is related to our understanding of the Big Bang. He also wrote a longer piece in The New York Times explaining the science behind and significance of the particle.

In January 2019, Krauss became President of the Origins Project Foundation, a non-profit corporation intended to host public panel discussions on science, culture, and social issues. On June 21, 2019, a new video podcast, The Origins Podcast with Lawrence Krauss, launched with Krauss as host. The first episodes included dialogues with Ricky Gervais, Noam Chomsky, and Jenny Boylan.

In 2024, Krauss edited the book The War on Science, a collection of essays from 39 academics addressing perceived threats to academic freedom and scientific progress, such as DEI programs, wokeness, and cancel culture. Contributors include Nicholas Christakis, Richard Dawkins, Peter Boghossian, Jordan Peterson, Steven Pinker, Alan Sokal and Elizabeth Weiss. Krauss wrote an introductory overview and an epilogue. This is his third book published through the conservative Christian imprint Post Hill Press.

== Scientific work ==
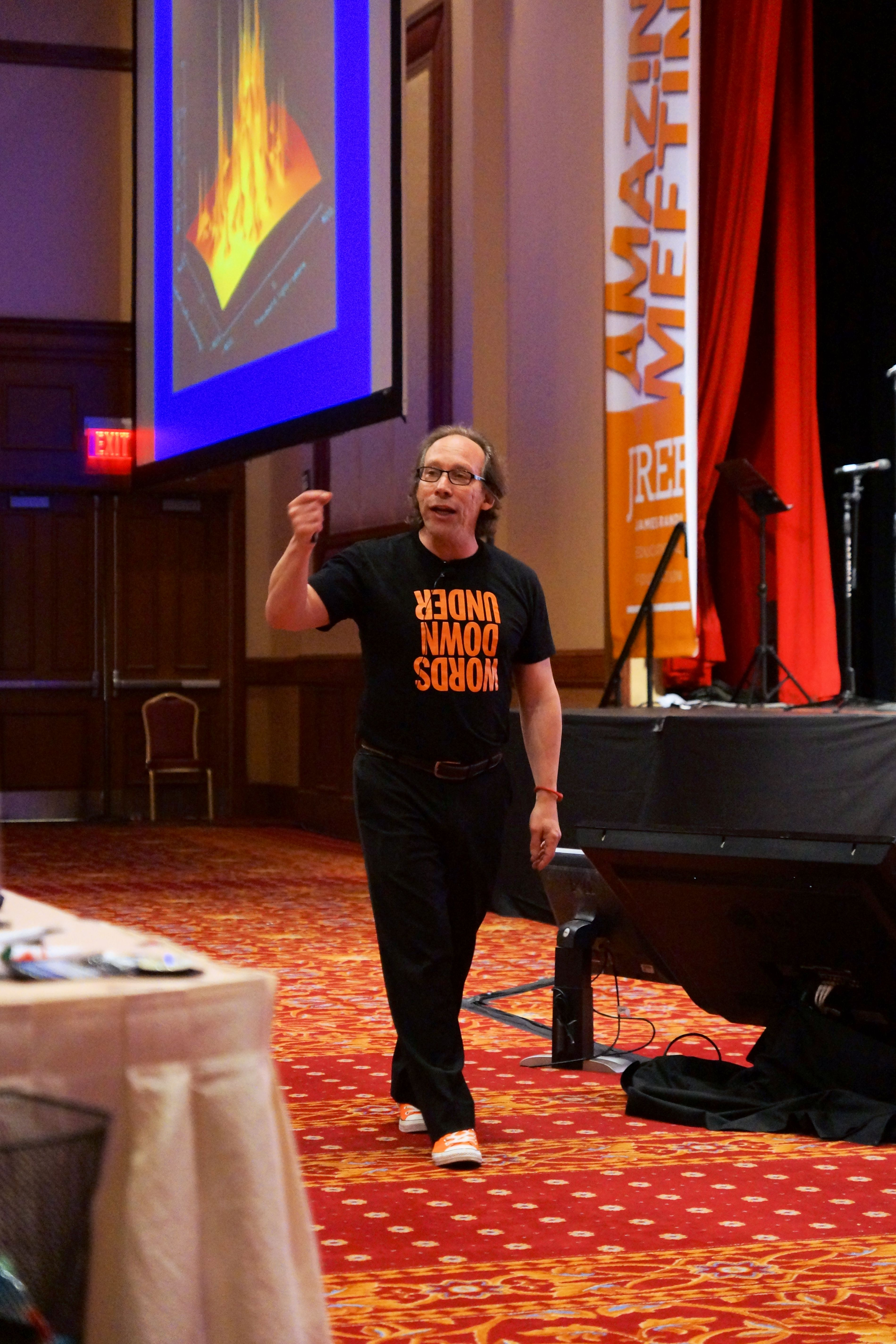
Krauss lecturing about cosmology at TAM 2012

Krauss mostly works in theoretical physics and has published research on a variety of topics within that field. In 1995 he argued in favour of the energy-density of the universe being dominated by the energy of empty space, quoting many other scientists who supported the existence of a nonzero cosmological constant. In 1998 this prediction was confirmed by two observational collaborations and in 2011 the Nobel Prize was awarded for their discovery. Krauss has formulated a model in which the Universe could have potentially come from "nothing", as outlined in his 2012 book A Universe from Nothing. He explains that certain arrangements of relativistic quantum fields might explain the existence of the Universe as we know it while disclaiming that he "has no idea if the notion [of taking quantum mechanics for granted] can be usefully dispensed with". As his model appears to agree with experimental observations of the Universe (such as its shape and energy density), it is referred to by some as a "plausible hypothesis". His model has been criticized by cosmologist and theologian George Ellis, who said it "is not tested science" but "philosophical speculation".

Initially, Krauss was skeptical of the existence of the Higgs boson. However, after it was detected by CERN, he researched the implications of the Higgs field on the nature of dark energy.

== Activism ==
Lawrence Krauss sends a solidarity message to ex-Muslims convening in London in July 2017.

Krauss has argued that public policy debates in the United States should have a greater focus on science. He criticized Republican presidential candidate Ben Carson's statements on science, writing that Carson's remarks "suggest he never learned or chooses to ignore basic, well-tested scientific concepts".

Krauss has described himself as an antitheist and takes part in public debates on religion. Krauss is featured in the 2013 documentary The Unbelievers, in which he and Richard Dawkins travel across the globe speaking publicly about the importance of science and reason as opposed to religion and superstition. He has participated in many debates with religious apologists, including William Lane Craig and John Lennox.

In his book A Universe from Nothing: Why There is Something Rather than Nothing (2012), Krauss discusses the premise that something cannot come from nothing, which has often been used as an argument for the existence of a prime mover. He has since argued in a debate with John Ellis and Don Cupitt that the laws of physics allow for the Universe to be created from nothing. "What would be the characteristics of a universe that was created from nothing, just with the laws of physics and without any supernatural shenanigans? The characteristics of the universe would be precisely those of the ones we live in." In an interview with The Atlantic, however, he states that he has never claimed that "questions about origins are over". According to Krauss, "I don't ever claim to resolve that infinite regress of why-why-why-why-why; as far as I'm concerned it's turtles all the way down".

== Honors ==
In an interview with Krauss in the Scientific American, science writer Claudia Dreifus called Krauss "one of the few top physicists who is also known as a public intellectual." Krauss is one of very few to have received awards from all three major American physics societies: the American Physical Society, the American Association of Physics Teachers, and the American Institute of Physics. In 2012, he was awarded the National Science Board's Public Service Medal for his contributions to public education in science and engineering in the United States.

== Controversies ==
=== Relationship with Jeffrey Epstein ===
In 2006, Krauss helped organize a conference on gravity funded by a foundation run by financier and later-convicted sex offender Jeffrey Epstein. The conference was held on St. Thomas in the U.S. Virgin Islands and included a trip to Epstein's private island for dinner. Krauss helped invite roughly 20 well-known physicists to the conference, including Gerard 't Hooft, David Gross, Frank Wilczek, Stephen Hawking, Kip Thorne, Lisa Randall, Maria Spiropulu, Barry Barish, and Alan Guth, as well as author Betsy Devine.

From 2010 to 2017, The Origins Project, which was at the time under the direction of Krauss, received $250,000 from an Epstein foundation called "Enhanced Education".

Krauss defended Epstein after his 2008 guilty plea of procuring a girl below age 18 for prostitution. In 2011, Krauss told an interviewer, "As a scientist I always judge things on empirical evidence and he always has women ages 19 to 23 around him, but I've never seen anything else, so as a scientist, my presumption is that whatever the problems were I would believe him over other people...I don't feel tarnished in any way by my relationship with Jeffrey; I feel raised by it."

Harvard Professor Steven Pinker said that Krauss was one of several colleagues who invited him to "salons and coffee klatsches" that included Epstein. In August 2025, The New York Times published reports of letters given to Epstein for his 63rd birthday, including one from Krauss. Krauss stated that he did not recall the letter but attended several gatherings at Epstein's home.

On November 12, 2025, the House Committee on Oversight and Government Reform published additional files related to Epstein showing that he had exchanged more than 60 emails with Krauss. In 2011, Krauss wrote to Epstein, "Beyond anything else, you are my friend. I hope we can both always remember that, no matter what." In an email dated 2017, Krauss asked Epstein for advice in responding to allegations of sexual misconduct. In another exchange, dated 2018, Krauss responded to Epstein's joke "Let's do a men of the world conference," by suggesting that the notional conference include Kevin Spacey, Bill Clinton, Al Franken and Woody Allen. Each of these men had been publicly accused of sexual wrongdoing. In February 2026, the Department of Justice released further documents indicating that Epstein emailed Krauss in an attempt to get him to introduce him to podcaster Joe Rogan. Krauss reached out to Rogan but he refused to meet Epstein.

=== Allegations of sexual misconduct ===
In a February 2018 article describing allegations that "range from offensive comments to groping and non-consensual sexual advances", BuzzFeed News reported a variety of sexual misconduct claims against Krauss, including two complaints from his years at Case Western Reserve University. Krauss responded that the article was "slanderous" and "factually incorrect". In a public statement, he apologized to anyone he made feel intimidated or uncomfortable, but stated that the BuzzFeed article "ignored counter-evidence, distorted the facts and made absurd claims about [him]." Case Western Reserve responded to the student complaint by restricting Krauss's access to campus, although by the time the sanctions began he had already left for ASU.

ASU stated that they had not received complaints from faculty, staff, or students before the BuzzFeed article but subsequently began an internal investigation regarding an accusation that Krauss grabbed a woman's breast while at a convention in Australia. Investigators interviewed two eyewitnesses, and two other witnesses who immediately spoke with the unnamed woman. The witnesses described the woman as troubled and shocked. The woman told investigators that "she did not feel victimized, felt it was a clumsy interpersonal interaction and thought she had handled it in the moment." ASU found that the preponderance of evidence suggested that Krauss had violated the university's policy against sexual harassment by grabbing a woman's breast without her permission. As a result, Krauss was not renewed as director of the Origins Project and the university moved its staff to a project run by planetary scientist Lindy Elkins-Tanton, formally ending the Origins project.

In response to the university determination, Krauss produced a 51-page appeal document responding to the allegations, including a counter-claim that a photo claimed to be of Krauss grabbing a woman's breast was actually showing his hand moving away from the woman.

Several organizations also canceled scheduled talks by Krauss. Krauss resigned from the position of chair of the Bulletin of the Atomic Scientists Board of Sponsors when informed that its other members felt his presence was distracting "from the ability of the Bulletin to effectively carry out [its] work".

Following the ASU investigation, Krauss was placed on paid administrative leave starting in March 2018 and was recommended for dismissal by the dean of the department. He later retired from ASU at the end of the 2018–2019 academic year.

== Bibliography ==
Krauss has authored or co-authored more than three hundred scientific studies and review articles on cosmology and theoretical physics.

=== Books ===
- The Fifth Essence (1989), Basic Books, ISBN 978-0465023752
- Fear of Physics: A Guide for the Perplexed (1994), Basic Books, ISBN 0-465-02367-3
- The Physics of Star Trek (1996), Basic Books, ISBN 0-465-00559-4
- Beyond Star Trek: Physics from Alien Invasions to the End of Time (1998), HarperCollins, ISBN 978-0060977573
- Quintessence: The Search for Missing Mass in the Universe (2000), Basic Books, ISBN 0-465-03741-0
- Atom: An Odyssey from the Big Bang to Life on Earth...and Beyond (2001), Little, Brown and Company, ISBN 0-316-18309-1
- Hiding in the Mirror: The Mysterious Allure of Extra Dimensions, from Plato to String Theory and Beyond (2005), Viking Press, ISBN 0-670-03395-2
- Quantum Man: Richard Feynman's Life in Science (2011), Atlas & Company ISBN 978-0-393-06471-1
- A Universe from Nothing: Why There Is Something Rather Than Nothing (2012), Atria Books, ISBN 978-1-4516-2445-8
- The Greatest Story Ever Told—So Far: Why Are We Here? (2017), Atria Books, ISBN 978-1-4767-7761-0
- The Physics of Climate Change (2021), Post Hill Press, ISBN 978-1642938166
- The Known Unknowns (2023), Head of Zeus/Apollo, ISBN 978-1801100649
- The Edge of Knowledge (2023), Post Hill Press, ISBN 978-1637588567
- The War on Science (2025), Post Hill Press, ISBN 979-8888457566

==== Contributor ====
- 100 Things to Do Before You Die (plus a few to do afterwards). 2004. Profile Books. ISBN 978-1861979254
- The Religion and Science Debate: Why Does It Continue? 2009. Yale Press. ISBN 978-0300152999

=== Articles ===
- "The Energy of Empty Space that Isn't Zero". Edge.org. July 5, 2006.
- "A dark future for cosmology". 2007. Physics World.
- "The End of Cosmology". 2008. Scientific American. ISSN 0036-8733
- "The return of a static universe and the end of cosmology". 2008. International Journal of Modern Physics.
- "Late time behavior of false vacuum decay: Possible implications for cosmology and metastable inflating states". 2008. Physical Review Letters.
- "The Cosmological Constant is Back", with M. S. Turner, Gen.Rel.Grav.27:1137–1144, 1995
- "Why I love neutrinos". Scientific American. Vol. 302, no. 6. June 2010. p. 19. Bibcode:2010SciAm.302f..34K. doi:10.1038/scientificamerican0610-34. ISSN 0036-8733. PMID 20521478.

== Media ==
=== Documentary films ===
- The Unbelievers (2013)
- The Principle (2014)
- The Choice is Ours on YouTube (2016)
- Lo and Behold, Reveries of the Connected World (2016)
- The Farthest (2017)

=== Television ===
- How the Universe Works (2010–2018)

=== Films ===
- London Fields (2015) (cameo)
- Salt and Fire (2016)
- Intersect (2020)

== Awards ==
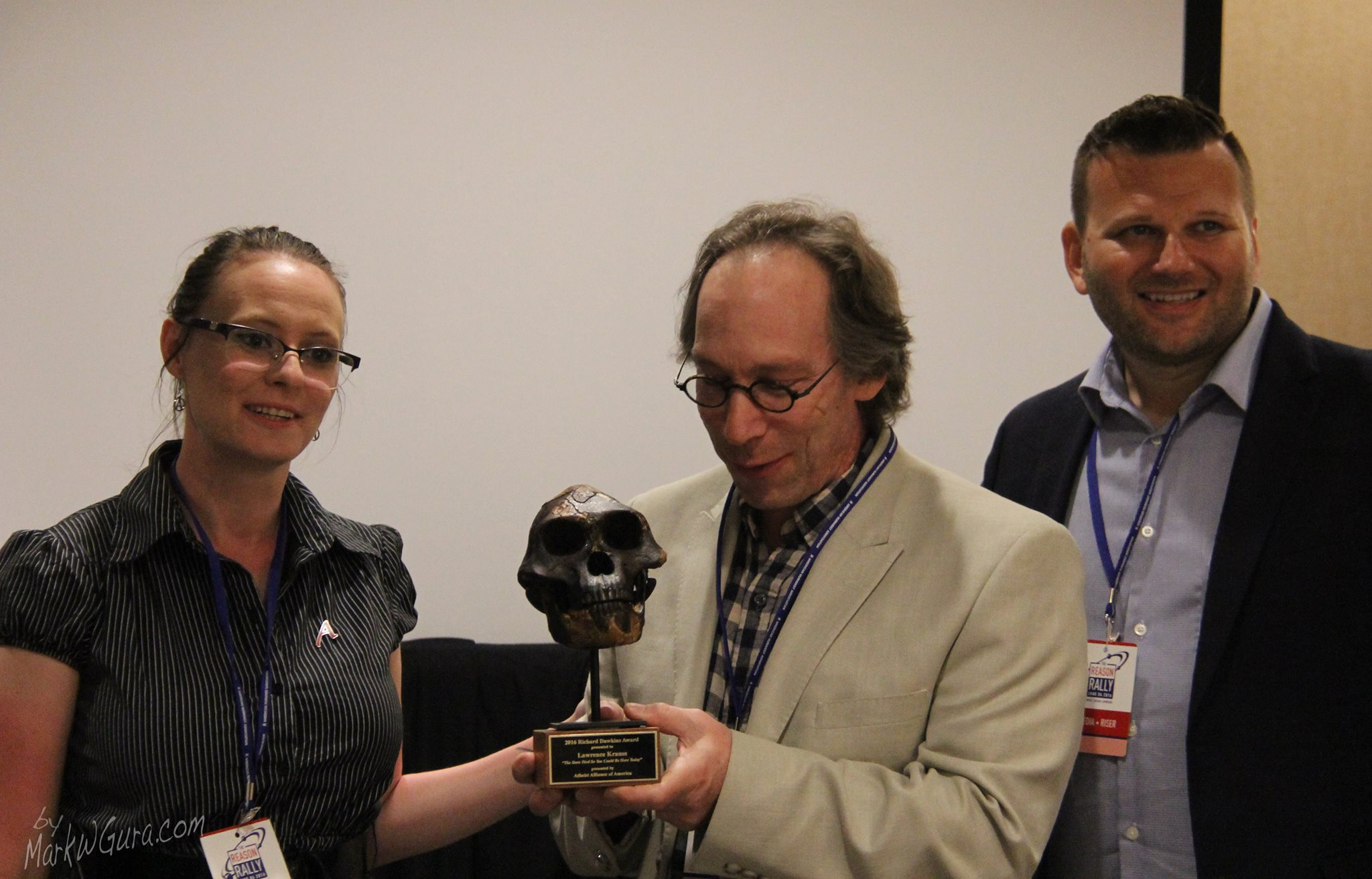
Krauss is given the Richard Dawkins Award by Mark W. Gura and Melissa Pugh of Atheist Alliance of America at the Reason Rally 2016.

- Gravity Research Foundation First Prize Award in the 1984 Essay Competition
- American Association for the Advancement of Science's Award for the Public Understanding of Science and Technology (2000)
- Julius Edgar Lilienfeld Prize (2001)
- Andrew Gemant Award (2001)
- American Institute of Physics Science Writing Award (2002)
- Oersted Medal (2003)
- American Physical Society Joseph A. Burton Forum Award (2005)
- Center for Inquiry World Congress Science in the Public Interest Award (2009)
- Helen Sawyer Hogg Prize of the Royal Astronomical Society of Canada and the Astronomical Society of Canada (2009)
- Physics World Book of the Year, 2011
- National Science Board 2012 Public Service Award and Medal (2012)
- Elected as Laureate of the International Academy of Humanism (2013)
- Gravity Research Foundation First Prize Award in the 2014 Essay Competition
- Humanist of the Year, 2015, American Humanist Association (revoked in 2018 after allegations of sexual misconduct)
- Richard Dawkins Award 2016, Atheist Alliance of America
