= Science Writing Award =

Award for excellence in writing about science

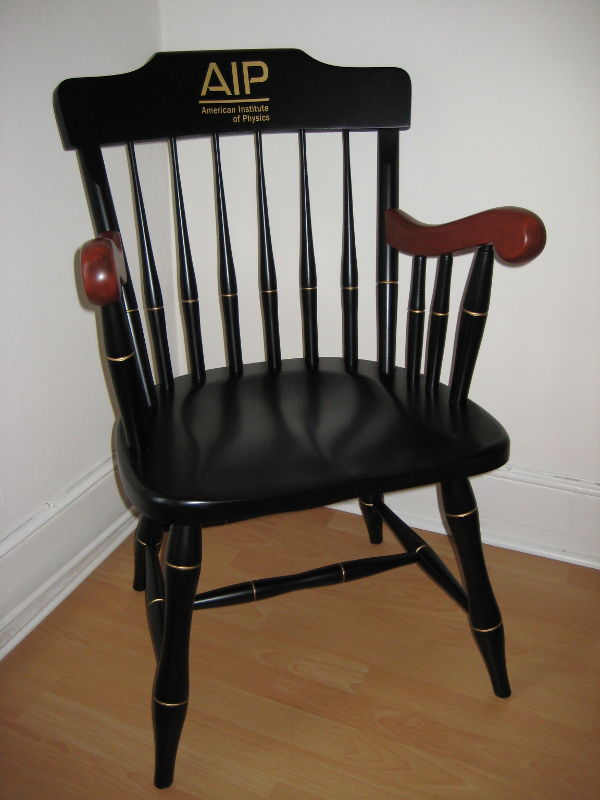
A Windsor chair awarded to recipients of the AIP Science Writing Award

The American Institute of Physics (AIP) instituted their Science Writing Award to "promote effective science communication in print and broadcast media in order to improve the general public's appreciation of physics, astronomy, and allied science fields." The winner receives $3000, and an engraved Windsor chair. The award is given in three broad categories: 1) science writing, 2) work intended for children, and 3) work done in new media. The AIP stopped issuing awards to three categories: 1) work by a professional journalist (last awarded in 2011) 2) work by a scientist (last awarded in 2009), and 3) broadcast media (last awarded in 2009)

Winners of this Science Writing Award include Nobel Prize winners Charles Townes, Steven Weinberg, and Kip Thorne; other notable winners include Simon Singh, Neil DeGrasse Tyson, Lawrence Krauss, John Wheeler, Leonard Susskind, Clifford Martin Will, Abraham Pais, Heinz Pagels, Banesh Hoffmann, and Martin Gardner. Marcia Bartusiak has won the award three times, twice for her books (in 2019 and 2001) and once for her journalism (in 1982).

== Winners: New Media ==
- 2012: - Anna Rothschild for Nova, "The Amazing Atomic Clock"

== Past Winners: Books ==
- 2020: Susan Hockfield for The Age of Living Machines (W.W. Norton & Company).
- 2019: Marcia Bartusiak for Dispatches from Planet 3 (Yale University Press).
- 2019: David Hu for How to Walk on Water and Climb Up Walls (Yale University Press).
- 2018: David Baron for American Eclipse: A Nation's Epic Race to Catch the Shadow of the Moon and Win the Glory of the World (Liveright Publishing Corporation/W. W. Norton & Company).
- 2017: Timothy Jorgensen for Strange Glow: The Story of Radiation (Princeton University Press).
- 2016: Chris Woodford for Atoms Under the Floorboards: The Surprising Science Hidden in Your Home (Bloomsbury).
- 2015: Charles Adler for Wizards, Aliens, and Starships: Physics and Math in Fantasy and Science Fiction (Princeton University Press).
- 2014: Lee Billings for Five Billion Years of Solitude: the Search for Life Among the Stars (Current/Penguin).

== Past Winners: Journalist ==
- 2011: George Musser for Scientific American magazine,"Could Time End?"
- 2010: Tom Zoellner for Penguin Group, "Uranium: War, Energy, and the Rock that Shaped the World"
- 2008: Ann Finkbeiner for Viking/Penguin,"The Jasons"
- 2007: Tim Folger, Discover Magazine,"If an Electron can be in Two Places at Once, Why Can't You?"
- 2006: Barbara Goldsmith for WW Norton and Atlas Books, "Obsessive Genius"
- 2005: Michael Moyer for Popular Science, "Journey to the 10th Dimension"
- 2004: J. Madeleine Nash for Warner Books, El Niño: Unlocking the Secrets of the Master Weather-Maker
- 2003: Diane Tennant for The Virginian-Pilot,"A Cosmic Tale"
- 2002: No award given
- 2001: Marcia Bartusiak for Joseph Henry Press, Einstein's Unfinished Symphony
- 2000: Ron Cowen for USA Today, "Quantum Leap in Research Draws Cosmic Insight Closer"; Science News "Travelin' Light"; The Washington Post "Now Hear This!"
- 1999: Michael Lemonick, Other Worlds: The Search for Life in the Universe, Simon & Schuster
- 1998: Robyn Suriano and Todd Halvorson for Florida Today, "Cassini: Debating the Risks"
- 1997: Hazel Muir for New Scientist Magazine "Watch Out, Here Comes the Sun" and "A Fast Rain's Going to Fall"
- 1996: K.C. Cole for The Los Angeles Times,(3 newspaper articles)
- 1995: Gary Taubes for Discover Magazine, "Welcome to Femtoland"
- 1994: Dick Teresi for Omni Magazine, "The Last Great Experiment of the 20th Century"
- 1993: Billy Goodman for Air & Space Magazine, "The Planet Hunters"
- 1992: Dennis Overbye for Harper Collins Publishers, Lonely Hearts of the Cosmos
- 1991: Charles Petit for Mosaic Magazine, "Vanishingly Close to Absolute Zero"
- 1990: Jerry E. Bishop for The Wall Street Journal, "Cold Fusion"
- 1989: Timothy Ferris for William & Morrow Inc, Coming of Age in the Milky Way
- 1988: Richard Preston for The Atlantic Monthly Press, First Light
- 1987: Shannon Brownlee and Allan Chen for Discover Magazine, "Waiting for the Big One"
- 1986: Arthur Fisher for Mosaic, "Chaos: The Ultimate Asymmetry"
- 1985: Ben Patrusky for World Book Yearbook, "The Wandering Continents"
- 1984: John Tierney for Discover Magazine,"Perpetual Commotion"
- 1983: Martin Gardner for Discover Magazine, "Quantum Weirdness"
- 1982: Marcia Bartusiak for Discover Magazine, "The Ultimate Timepiece"
- 1981: Leo Janus for Science 80 Magazine,"Timekeepers of the Solar System"
- 1980: Dennis Overbye for Omni Magazine, "The Wizard of Time and Space"
- 1979: Robert C. Cowen for The Christian Science Monitor, "The New Astronomy"
- 1978: Timothy Ferris for The Red Limit: The Search for the Edge of the Universe
- 1977: William D. Metz for Science Magazine, "Fusion Research"
- 1976: Frederic Golden for Time Magazine, "Forecast: Earthquake"
- 1975: Tom Alexander for Fortune Magazine, "Ominous Changes in the World's Weather"
- 1974: Patrick Young for The National Observer, "A Quake Is Due at..."
- 1973: Edward Edelson for The New York News, "The Mystery of Space"
- 1972: Jerry E. Bishop for The Wall Street Journal, "Celestial Clue"
- 1971: Kenneth Weaver for National Geographic, "Voyage to the Planets"
- 1970: C.P. Gilmore for Popular Science, "Can We Stop Earthquakes from Happening"
- 1969: Walter S. Sullivan for The New York Times, "Flight of Apollo 8"
- 1968: William J. Perkinson for The Baltimore Sun, "ABM Primer: Physics for Defense"

== Past Winners: Scientist ==
2011: Dan Falk Scientific magazine Could Time End?

2009 - Dan Falk COSMOS magazine End of Days: A Universe in Ruins

2008 - Gino Segre Viking/Penguin Faust in Copenhagen

2007 - James Trefil Astronomy magazine Where is the Universe Heading?

2006: Simon Singh Harper Collins Big Bang

2005: Neil DeGrasse Tyson Natural History Magazine In the Beginning

2004: Len Fisher Arcade Publishing, Inc. How to Dunk a Doughnut: The Science of Everyday Life www.lenfisher.co.uk

2003: Ray Jayawardhana Astronomy Magazine Beyond Black

2002: Lawrence Krauss Little, Brown & Co Atom: An Odyssey from the Big Bang to Life on Earth...and Beyond

Honorable Mention: Ken Croswell The Free Press The Universe at Midnight

2001: Neil de Grasse Tyson, Charles Liu, and Robert Irion Joseph Henry Press One Universe

2000: Charles H. Townes Oxford University Press How the Laser Happened

1999: John Wheeler and Kenneth Ford, W.W. Norton, Geons, Black Holes & Quantum Foam

1998: Leonard Susskind, Scientific American, Black Holes and the Information Paradox

1997: Award postponed until 1998

1996: Mitchell Begelman & Martin Rees W.H. Freeman & Co. Gravity's Fatal Attraction: Black Holes in the Universe

1995: Eric Chaisson HarperCollins Publishing The Hubble Wars

1994: Kip S. Thorne W.W. Norton & Company Black Holes and Time Warps: Einstein's Outrageous Legacy

1993: Hans C. von Baeyer Random House Taming the Atom

1992: David C. Cassidy W.H. Freeman & Co. Uncertainty: The Life and Science of Werner Heisenberg

1991: Harold Lewis W.W. Norton & Co. Technological Risk

1990: Bruce Murray W.W. Norton & Co. Journey Into Space

1989: Mark Littmann John Wiley & Sons Planets Beyond: Discovering the Outer Solar System

1988: Michael Riordan Simon & Schuster The Hunting of the Quark

1987: Clifford Martin Will Basic Books Was Einstein Right?

1986: Donald Goldsmith Walker and Company Nemesis: The Death Star

1985: Edwin C. Krupp Macmillan Publishing Company The Comet and You

1984: George Greenstein Freundlich Books Frozen Star

1983: Abraham Pais Oxford University Press Subtle is the Lord...The Science and the Life of Albert Einstein

1982: Heinz Pagels Simon & Schuster The Cosmic Code: Quantum Physics as the Language of Nature

1981: Eric Chaisson Little, Brown & Company Cosmic Dawn

1980: William J. Kaufmann, III, W.H. Freeman & Company Black Holes and Warped Spacetime

1979: Hans C. von Baeyer Alumni Gazette, College of William & Mary The Wonder of Gravity

1978: Edwin C. Krupp Doubleday & Company In Search of Ancient Astronomies

1977: Steven Weinberg Basic Books, Inc. The First Three Minutes

1976: Jeremy Bernstein The New Yorker Physicist: I.I. Rabi

1975: Robert H. March Science Year The Quandary Over Quarks

1974: Robert D. Chapman NASA/Goddard Space Flight Center Comet Kohoutek

1973: Banesh Hoffmann Viking Press Albert Einstein: Creator and Rebel

1972: Dietrich Schroeer Addison-Wesley Physics & Its Fifth Dimension: Society

1971: Robert H. March MacGraw-Hill Book Co., Inc. Physics for Poets

1970: Jeremy Bernstein (written for) Atomic Energy Commission The Elusive Neutrino

1969: Kip S. Thorne Science Year The Death of a Star

== Past Winners: Children's ==
2011: Vicki Wittenstein Boyds Mills Press "Planet Hunter: Geoff Marcy and the Search for Other Earths"

2010: Gillian Richardson Annick Press Ltd. "Kaboom! Explosions of All Kinds"

2009: Cora Lee and Gillian O'Reilly Annick Press "The Great Number Rumble: A story of Math in Surprising Places"

2008: Alexandra Siy and Dennis Kunkel Charlesbridge "SNEEZE!

2007: Jacob Berkowitz Kids Can Press "Jurassic Poop"

2006: David Garrison, Shannon Hunt and Jude Isabella Kids Can Press "Fantastic Feats and Failures"

2005: Bea Uusma Schyffert Chronicle Books "The Man Who Went to the Far Side of the Moon"

2004: Marianne Dyson National Geographic "Home on the Moon: Living in the Space Frontier"

2003: Ron Miller Twenty-First Century Books, a Division of The Millbrook Press Worlds Beyond Series: Extrasolar Planets, The Sun, Jupiter, and Venus

2002: Fred Bortz The Millbrook Press Techno-Matter: The Materials Behind the Marvels

2001: Cynthia Pratt Nicolson Kids Can Press Exploring Space

2000: Jill Frankel Hauser Williamson Publishing Science Play! Gizmos & Gadgets

1999: Elaine Scott Hyperion Books for Children Close Encounters

1998: Barbara Taylor Henry Holt and Company Earth Explained

1997: Donald Silver Silver Burdett Press Extinction is Forever

1996: Steve Tomecek W.H. Freeman and Company Bouncing & Bending Light

1995: Sally Ride and Tam O'Shaughnessy Crown Publishers, Inc. The Third Planet: Exploring the Earth from Space

1994: Wendy Baker, Andrew Haslam, and Alexandra Parsons Macmillan Make it Work!

1993: Gail Gibbons Holiday House Stargazers

1992: Gloria Skurzynski Bradbury Press Almost The Real Thing

1991: Richard Maurer Simon & Schuster Inc. Airborne

1990: David Macaulay Houghton Mifflin Company The Way Things Work

1989: Gail Kay Haines Putnam & Grosset Micromysteries

1988: Susan Kovacs Buxbaum, Rita Golden Graham, and Maryann Cocca-Leffler Basic Books Splash! All About Baths

== Past Winner: Broadcast Media ==
2009: Tom Shachtman and David Dugan Windfall Films in collaboration with Meridian Productions and broadcast on WGBH/NOVA in association with TPT/Twin Cities Public Television "Absolute Zero"

2008: Julia Cort WGBH/NOVA scienceNOW "Asteroid"

2007: Jim Handman, Pat Senson, and Bob McDonald CBC Radio "Multiple Worlds, Parallel Universes"

2006: David Kestenbaum National Public Radio "Einstein's Miraculous Year: How Smart was Einstein?"

2005: Jon Palfreman WNET New York "Innovation: Light Speed"

2004: William S. Hammack "Public Radio Pieces" WILL-AM Radio 2003: Jim Handman, Pat Senson, and Bob McDonald CBC Radio "It's About Time"

2002: David Kestenbaum National Public Radio "Measuring Muons" (RealMedia file)

2001: Jon Palfreman WGBH- Frontline/NOVA "What's Up with the Weather?"

2000: Craig Heaps KTVU- TV Time & Space Space Weather

1999: Dan Falk CBC Radio From Empedocles to Einstein

1998: Sandy Rathbun and Dave Greenleaf KVOA-TV Asteroid: The Real Story
