= Gino Segrè =

Italian-American physicist (born 1938)

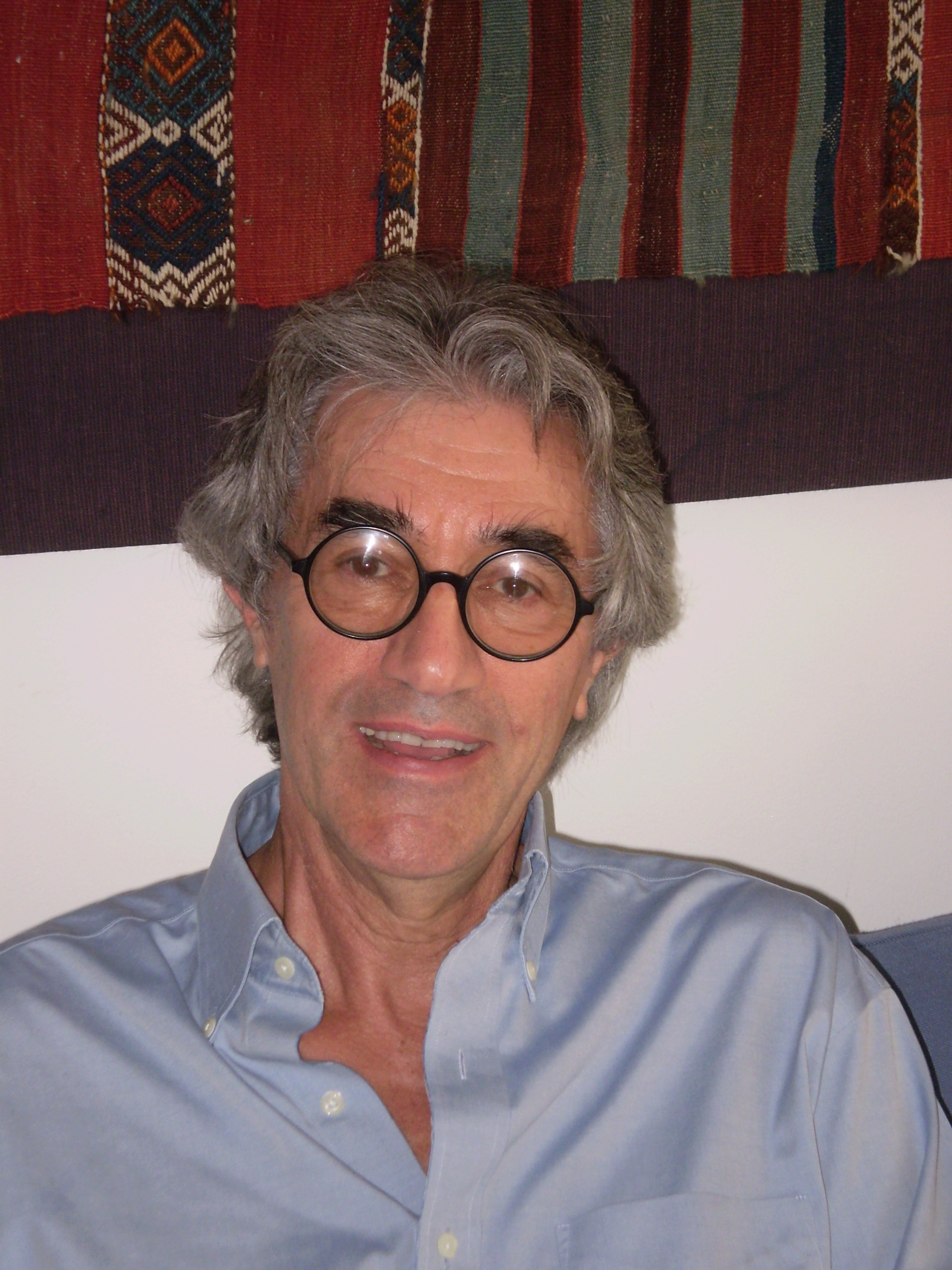
- Born: Gino Claudio Segrè; October 4, 1938 (age 88); Florence, Kingdom of Italy
- Education: Harvard College (BA, 1959); MIT (PhD, 1963)
- Known for: Faust in Copenhagen (2007)
- Children: 7, including Julie and Kristine
- Scientific career
- Fields: Physics; History of science
- Workplaces: CERN; UC Berkeley; University of Pennsylvania

Notes
- Emilio Segrè was his uncle

Gino Claudio Segrè (born October 4, 1938) is an Italian-American physicist and professor emeritus at the University of Pennsylvania. He is the author of several books on the history of science, particularly on atomic physics. Segrè's Faust in Copenhagen was a finalist in the Los Angeles Times Book Fair and winner of the American Institute of Physics Science Writing Award.

== Birth and education ==
Gino Segrè was born in Florence, Italy, to an Italian Jewish father (Angelo Segrè) and a German Catholic mother (Katherine "Katia" née Schall). Following the anti-semitic laws enacted in Italy in 1938, family immigrated to New York City in May 1939, where they resided for 8 years before returning to Florence. Segrè's uncle, Nobel laureate physicist Emilio Segrè, also emigrated to the United States for the same reason.

Gino Segrè received a Bachelor of Arts degree from Harvard College in 1959 and a Ph.D. degree in physics from Massachusetts Institute of Technology in 1963. Afterwards, Segrè became a fellow at CERN and the University of California, Berkeley. He joined the University of Pennsylvania department of physics as a professor in 1967, where he remained until he retired in 2007. His honors include fellowships from Guggenheim Foundation, Sloan Foundation and Rockefeller Foundation.

== Books ==
Since 2002, Segrè has published four books on the history of science.

The Pope of Physics: Enrico Fermi and the Birth of the Atomic Age was published in 2016. Written with his wife Bettina Hoerlin, The Pope of Physics explores the life and career of famous Italian physicist Enrico Fermi, whose colleagues referred to him as the Pope due to his infallibility. Fermi has a rich legacy of scientific advances, and is best known for his leadership in building the atomic bomb. "Pope of Physics" was reviewed by The Wall Street Journal and Nature.

Segrè's 2011 book Ordinary Geniuses is a dual biography of Max Delbruck and George Gamow, two physicists who made major contributions to the field of biology with their "pioneering" spirits and practical jokes. Ordinary Geniuses was reviewed by Jeremy Bernstein in The Wall Street Journal and Jonathon Keats in New Scientist.

Segrè's 2007 book Faust in Copenhagen recounts how a group of 40 physicists assembled at Niels Bohr's Copenhagen Institute focusing on the discovery of the neutron. On the final night of the meeting, the younger physicists mount a skit that was a parody of Goethe's Faust, adapted to the world of physics. By Segrè's description, "What the physicists didn't realize was that within a year, Hitler's ascent to power would change their world and within a decade their studies of the atomic nucleus would force them to make their own Faustian bargains." Faust in Copenhagen was reviewed in the Sunday New York Times book section by George Johnson.

Segrè's 2002 book A Matter of Degrees: What Temperature Reveals about the Past and Future of our Species, Planet and Universe explores temperature's many mysteries, from the causes of fevers in humans to the origin of the universe. Marcia Bartusiak reviewed Matter of Degrees in The New York Times.

== Scientific research ==
Segrè's research covers high-energy physics, including grand unification and the fine-structure constant, and astrophysics, including baryon asymmetry, pulsar kicks, and neutrino oscillations.

== Personal life ==
Segrè is married to Bettina Hoerlin (born 1939), a former Philadelphia Health Commissioner. She is the daughter of Los Alamos physicist Hermann Hoerlin and Kate (née Tietz, formerly Schmid). Hoerlin has chronicled her parents meeting and departure from Nazi Germany in her book Steps of Courage. Together they have seven children (including Julie Segre and Kristine Yaffe) and nine grandchildren. They live in Philadelphia.
