= American Eclipse =

American Eclipse or Great American Eclipse may refer to:

== Eclipses ==
- Solar eclipse of July 29, 1878, "American Eclipse", a total solar eclipse, starting in Sibera; from Alaska, through British Columbia, across the contiguous United States
- Solar eclipse of June 8, 1918, "Great American Eclipse", a total solar eclipse seen widely across the contiguous United States
- Solar eclipse of August 21, 2017, "Great American Eclipse", a total solar eclipse seen widely across the contiguous United States
- Solar eclipse of October 14, 2023, a coast to coast annular eclipse that crossed through the Southwestern United States
- Solar eclipse of April 8, 2024, "Great North American Eclipse", a total solar eclipse seen widely coast-to-coast across North America, from Mexico, through the contiguous United States, to Canada
- Solar eclipse of August 12, 2045, the "Greatest American Eclipse", predicted to traverse 12 U.S. states

== Other uses ==
- American Eclipse (book), the 2017 book about the 1878 solar eclipse by David Baron
- American Eclipse (racehorse), a 19th-century racehorse

== See also ==
- List of solar eclipses visible from the United States
