= William Langston =

J William Langston
- Education: University of Missouri School of Medicine
- Occupations: Neurologist; Founder, CEO, and Scientific Director of the Parkinson's Institute
- Notable work: The Case of the Frozen Addicts

J. William Langston is the founder and chief scientific officer, movement disorder specialist, and chief executive officer of the Parkinson's Institute and Clinical Center in Sunnyvale, California, the founding member of the Scientific Advisory Board for the Michael J. Fox Foundation and the Co-Editor-in-Chief of the Journal of Parkinson's Disease. He is a graduate of the University of Missouri School of Medicine. Langston was formerly a faculty member at Stanford University and Chairman of Neurology at Santa Clara Valley Medical Center in San Jose, California. Langston has authored or co-authored some 360 peer-reviewed articles in the field of neurology, most of which are on Parkinson's disease and related disorders. Langston gained national and international recognition in 1982 for the discovery of the link between a "synthetic heroin" contaminant (MPTP) and parkinsonism.

== Career ==
In 1982 William Langston was head of neurology at Santa Clara Valley Medical Center when he made a major breakthrough in the research of Parkinson's Disease as a result of several incidents detailed in the book The Case of the Frozen Addicts. Langston continued research into Parkinson's Disease and became an internationally known neuroscientist. He opened the Parkinson's Institute and Clinical Center in Sunnyvale, California in 1988 and became the chief executive officer and scientific director. Langston's current research interests include the study of mechanisms of neuronal degeneration, the etiology of Parkinson's disease, and the development of new strategies to slow or halt disease progression such as cell replacement therapy and gene therapy and, more recently, the possible environmental causes of Parkinson's disease such as pesticides, cluster cases and the early identification of affected people through genome mapping. In 2014 Carrolee Barlow became chief executive officer of the institute with Langston continuing as Chief Scientific Officer.

During an interview in 2009 Langston stated: "I would never promise I could solve the disease. What I would do is say, I think there's a very real possibility, with the adequate funding, that we could make major progress on both finding the cause of the disease, which could lead to prevention, and also major progress on finding ways to slow and halt disease progression. I think that's a realistic possibility in my lifetime, my career. I wouldn't have said that five or 10 years ago. A cure, I will not say."

== The Case of the Frozen Addicts ==
The Case of the Frozen Addicts was written by Langston and Jon Palfreman in 1995. A later edition was published in 2014. The book details the work done by Langston, his colleagues and associates around the world to isolate the neurotoxic contaminant which caused the Parkinson's like symptoms in a number of heroin users and to develop methods of utilising this discovery. The book includes discovery of the dangers to researchers in handling the contaminant and some competition and contention between researchers.

William Langston was head of neurology at Santa Clara Valley Medical Center in 1982 when a drug offender was admitted who could neither move or talk. He had been admitted from the county jail and initially treated as a malingerer but later admitted to the psychiatric unit with suspected catatonic schizophrenia. During an examination of the patient, Langston noticed his fingers moving, perhaps voluntarily, and wrapped them around a pencil. The patient began to write notes that indicated that his mind was normal but his body was not responding. He had taken heroin before the symptoms developed. Through coincidental personal connections and media presentations another five patients with the same symptoms were discovered. All had what appeared to be symptoms of advanced Parkinson's Disease. In an attempt to save their lives Dr Langston administered L-dopa, a drug then recently introduced to treat Parkinson's Disease. The patients responded and could move and talk. (Unfortunately all six patients later developed severe side effects.)

The common link between the patients was the batch of heroin they had taken. Medical and police research established that the batch of synthetic heroin all six patients had used contained a neurotoxic contaminant, MPTP. MPTP (which sometimes taints MPPP, an effective synthetic opioid), is selectively toxic to the same nerve cells in the brain which die in Parkinson's disease, the substantia nigra. The discovery of the biologic effects of this compound led to a renaissance of the basic and clinical research in Parkinson's disease.

The clinical implications of this case were ground breaking. Parkinson's Disease is only experienced by humans but animal testing is essential in drug development. Now Parkinson's Disease symptoms could be induced in monkeys by using MPTP and research could begin into drugs to treat the disease. "[W]hat had started as a drug tragedy was to open a new chapter of medical research which would offer hope to Parkinson's disease sufferers throughout the world."

== Awards ==
Langston has received numerous awards, including the Distinguished Achievement Award from Modern Medicine, the Sarah M. Poiley Award from the New York Academy of Sciences, the 30th Anniversary Award from the Parkinson's Disease Foundation in 1987, the Distinguished Clinical Investigator Award from Roche Pharmaceuticals, the 1999 Movement Disorders Research Award from the American Academy of Neurology, the 2008 Donald Calne Lectureship and 2012 Robert A. Pritzker Prize for Leadership in Parkinson's Research from The Michael J. Fox Foundation for Parkinson's Research.

== Selected publications ==
- Langston JW, Ballard P, Tetrud JW, Irwin I (Feb 1983). "Chronic parkinsonism in humans due to a product of meperidine-analog synthesis". Science. 219 (4587): 979–80. Bibcode:1983Sci...219..979L. doi:10.1126/science.6823561. PMID 6823561.
- Calne DB, Langston JW (Dec 1983). "Aetiology of Parkinson's disease". Lancet. 2 (8365–66): 1457–9. doi:10.1016/s0140-6736(83)90802-4. PMID 6140548. S2CID 1861553.
- Langston JW, Forno LS, Rebert CS, Irwin I (Feb 1984). "Selective nigral toxicity after systemic administration of 1-methyl-4-phenyl-1,2,5,6-tetrahydropyrine (MPTP) in the squirrel monkey". Brain Res. 292 (2): 390–4. doi:10.1016/0006-8993(84)90777-7. PMID 6607092. S2CID 34183578.
- Langston JW, Irwin I, Langston EB, Forno LS (Sep 1984). "Pargyline prevents MPTP-induced parkinsonism in primates". Science. 225 (4669): 1480–2. Bibcode:1984Sci...225.1480L. doi:10.1126/science.6332378. PMID 6332378.
- Langston JW, Forno LS, Rebert CS, Irwin I (Feb 1984). "Selective nigral toxicity after systemic administration of 1-methyl-4-phenyl-1,2,5,6-tetrahydropyrine (MPTP) in the squirrel monkey". Brain Res. 292 (2): 390–4. doi:10.1016/0006-8993(84)90777-7. PMID 6607092. S2CID 34183578.
- Langston JW, Irwin I, Langston EB, Forno LS (Jul 1984). "1-Methyl-4-phenylpyridinium ion (MPP+): identification of a metabolite of MPTP, a toxin selective to the substantia nigra". Neurosci Lett. 48 (1): 87–92. doi:10.1016/0304-3940(84)90293-3. PMID 6332288. S2CID 13442361.
- Ballard PA, Tetrud JW, Langston JW (Jul 1985). "Permanent human parkinsonism due to 1-methyl-4-phenyl-1,2,3,6-tetrahydropyridine (MPTP): seven cases". Neurology. 35 (7): 949–56. doi:10.1212/wnl.35.7.949. PMID 3874373. S2CID 42937174.
- Calne DB, Langston JW, Martin WR, Stoessl AJ, Ruth TJ, Adam MJ, Pate BD, Schulzer M (Sep 1985). "Positron emission tomography after MPTP: observations relating to the cause of Parkinson's disease". Nature. 317 (6034): 246–8. Bibcode:1985Natur.317..246C. doi:10.1038/317246a0. PMID 3876510. S2CID 4334172.
- Kiernan RJ, Mueller J, Langston JW, Van Dyke C (Oct 1987). "The Neurobehavioral Cognitive Status Examination: a brief but quantitative approach to cognitive assessment". Ann Intern Med. 107 (4): 481–5. doi:10.7326/0003-4819-107-4-481. PMID 3631786.
- Ricaurte GA, Forno LS, Wilson MA, DeLanney LE, Irwin I, Molliver ME, Langston JW (Jul 1988). "(+/-)3,4-Methylenedioxymethamphetamine selectively damages central serotonergic neurons in nonhuman primates". JAMA. 260 (1): 51–5. doi:10.1001/jama.260.1.51. PMID 2454332.
- Tetrud JW, Langston JW (Aug 1989). "The effect of deprenyl (selegiline) on the natural history of Parkinson's disease". Science. 245 (4917): 519–22. Bibcode:1989Sci...245..519T. doi:10.1126/science.2502843. PMID 2502843.
- Langston JW, Widner H, Goetz CG, Brooks D, Fahn S, Freeman T, Watts R (1992). "Core assessment program for intracerebral transplantations (CAPIT)". Mov Disord. 7 (1): 2–13. doi:10.1002/mds.870070103. PMID 1557062. S2CID 31485426.
- Widner H, Tetrud J, Rehncrona S, Snow B, Brundin P, Gustavii B, Björklund A, Lindvall O, Langston JW (Nov 1992). "Bilateral fetal mesencephalic grafting in two patients with parkinsonism induced by 1-methyl-4-phenyl-1,2,3,6-tetrahydropyridine (MPTP)". N Engl J Med. 327 (22): 1556–63. doi:10.1056/NEJM199211263272203. PMID 1435882.
- Langston, J. William; Palfryman, Jon (1995). The case of the frozen addicts. New York: Pantheon Books. ISBN 0-679-42465-2.
- Tanner CM, Ottman R, Goldman SM, Ellenberg J, Chan P, Mayeux R, Langston JW (Jan 1999). "Parkinson disease in twins: an etiologic study". JAMA. 281 (4): 341–6. doi:10.1001/jama.281.4.341. PMID 9929087.
- Langston JW, Forno LS, Tetrud J, Reeves AG, Kaplan JA, Karluk D (Oct 1999). "Evidence of active nerve cell degeneration in the substantia nigra of humans years after 1-methyl-4-phenyl-1,2,3,6-tetrahydropyridine exposure". Ann Neurol. 46 (4): 598–605. doi:10.1002/1531-8249(199910)46:4<598::AID-ANA7>3.0.CO;2-F. PMID 10514096. S2CID 46594270.
- Farrer M, Chan P, Chen R, Tan L, Lincoln S, Hernandez D, Forno L, Gwinn-Hardy K, Petrucelli L, Hussey J, Singleton A, Tanner C, Hardy J, Langston JW (Sep 2001). "Lewy bodies and parkinsonism in families with parkin mutations". Ann Neurol. 50 (3): 293–300. doi:10.1002/ana.1132. PMID 11558785. S2CID 32284790.
- McCormack AL, Thiruchelvam M, Manning-Bog AB, Thiffault C, Langston JW, Cory-Slechta DA, Di Monte DA (Jul 2002). "Environmental risk factors and Parkinson's disease: selective degeneration of nigral dopaminergic neurons caused by the herbicide paraquat". Neurobiol Dis. 10 (2): 119–27. doi:10.1006/nbdi.2002.0507. PMID 12127150. S2CID 8949162.
- Farrer M, Kachergus J, Forno L, Lincoln S, Wang DS, Hulihan M, Maraganore D, Gwinn-Hardy K, Wszolek Z, Dickson D, Langston JW (Feb 2004). "Comparison of kindreds with parkinsonism and alpha-synuclein genomic multiplications". Ann Neurol. 55 (2): 174–9. doi:10.1002/ana.10846. PMID 14755720. S2CID 71615640.
- Sherer TB, Fiske BK, Svendsen CN, Lang AE, Langston JW (Feb 2006). "Crossroads in GDNF therapy for Parkinson's disease". Mov Disord. 21 (2): 136–41. doi:10.1002/mds.20861. PMID 16470786. S2CID 23264917.
- Langston JW (Apr 2006). "The Parkinson's complex: parkinsonism is just the tip of the iceberg". Ann Neurol. 59 (4): 591–6. doi:10.1002/ana.20834. PMID 16566021. S2CID 9724726.
- Tanner CM, Ross GW, Jewell SA, Hauser RA, Jankovic J, Factor SA, Bressman S, Deligtisch A, Marras C, Lyons KE, Bhudhikanok GS, Roucoux DF, Meng C, Abbott RD, Langston JW (Sep 2009). "Occupation and risk of parkinsonism: a multicenter case-control study". Arch Neurol. 66 (9): 1106–13. doi:10.1001/archneurol.2009.195. PMID 19752299.
