= Tom Shachtman =

American writer and filmmaker (born 1942)

Tom Shachtman (born February 15, 1942) is an American author, journalist, filmmaker, and educator. He has published more than 30 books across a variety of topics, including histories, biographies and books for children. He lives in Connecticut.

== Awards ==
Shachtman and the British filmmaker David Dugan won the 2009 American Institute of Physics Science Writing Award for their two-part Nova documentary Absolute Zero.

== Books ==
=== Non-fiction ===
- The Day America Crashed: A Narrative Account of the Great Stock Market Crash of October 24, 1929 (1979, G. P. Putnam's Sons)
- Edith & Woodrow: A Presidential Romance (1981, G. P. Putnam's Sons)
- The Phony War, 1939–1940 (1982, Harper & Row)
- Decade of Shocks: Dallas to Watergate, 1963–1974 (1983, Poseidon Press)
- The FBI-KGB War: A Special Agent's Story, with Robert J. Lamphere (1986, Random House)
- The Gilded Leaf: Triumph, Tragedy, and Tobacco: Three Generations of the R. J. Reynolds Family and Fortune, with Patrick Reynolds (1989, Little, Brown)
- Straight to the Top: Beyond Loyalty, Gamesmanship, Mentors, and Other Corporate Myths, with Paul G. Stern (1990, Warner Books)
- Image by Design: From Corporate Vision to Business Reality, with Clive Chajet (1991, Addison-Wesley)
- Skyscraper Dreams: The Great Real Estate Dynasties of New York (1991, Little, Brown)
- Whoever Fights Monsters: Inside the Minds of the World's Most Notorious Serial Killers, with Robert K. Ressler (1992, St. Martin's Press)
- Justice Is Served, with Robert K. Ressler (1994, St. Martin's Press)
- The Inarticulate Society: Eloquence and Culture in America (1995, Free Press)
- I Have Lived in the Monster: A Report from the Abyss, with Robert K. Ressler (1997, St. Martin's Press)
- The Most Beautiful Villages of New England, with photographs by Len Rubenstein (1997, Thames & Hudson)
- Around the Block: The Business of a Neighborhood (1997, Harcourt Brace)
- Absolute Zero and the Conquest of Cold (1999, Houghton Mifflin)
- Torpedoed: An American Businessman's True Story of Secrets, Betrayal, Imprisonment in Russia, and the Battle to Set Him Free, with Edmond D. Pope (2001, Little, Brown)
- I Seek My Brethren: Ralph Goldman and "The Joint": The Work of the American Jewish Joint Distribution Committee (2001, Newmarket Press)
- Terrors and Marvels: How Science and Technology Changed the Character and outcome of World War II (2002, William Morrow)
- 25 to Life: The Truth, the Whole Truth, and Nothing but the Truth, with Leslie Crocker Snyder (2002, Warner Books)
- Rumspringa: To Be or Not to Be Amish (2006, North Point Press)
- Dead Center: Behind the Scenes at the World's Largest Medical Examiner's Office, with Shiya Ribowsky (2006, Regan)
- Airlift to America: How Barack Obama, Sr., John F. Kennedy, Tom Mboya, and 800 East African Students Changed Their World and Ours (2009, St. Martin's Press)
- The Forty Years War: The Rise and Fall of the Neocons, from Nixon to Obama, with Len Colodny (2010, Harper)
- Building Tall: My Life and the Invention of Construction Management: A Memoir, with John L. Tishman (2010, University of Michigan Press)
- American Iconoclast: The Life and Times of Eric Hoffer (2011, Hopewell)
- Gentlemen Scientists and Revolutionaries: The Founding Fathers in the Age of Enlightenment (2014, Palgrave Macmillan)
- How The French Saved America: Soldiers, Sailors, Diplomats, Louis XVI, and The Success of a Revolution (2017, Palgrave Macmillan)
- The Founding Fortunes: How the Wealthy Paid for and Profited from America's Revolution (2020, St. Martin's Press)

=== Books for children ===
- Growing Up Masai (1981, Macmillan)
- The Birdman of St. Petersburg: Ralph T. Heath, Jr. (1982, Macmillan)
- Parade!, with photographs by Chuck Saaf (1985, Macmillan)
- America's Birthday: The Fourth of July, with photographs by Chuck Saaf (1986, Macmillan)
- Beachmaster: A Story of Daniel Au Fond (1988, Henry Holt & Co.)
- Video Power: A Complete Guide to Writing, Planning, and Shooting Videos, with Harriet Shelare (1988, Henry Holt & Co.)
- Wavebender: A Story of Daniel Au Fond (1989, Henry Holt & Co.)
- The President Builds a House (1989, Simon & Schuster)
- Driftwhistler: A Story of Daniel Au Fond (1991, Henry Holt & Co.)
