= Einstein's Unfinished Symphony =

Book by Marcia Bartusiak

Einstein's Unfinished Symphony: Listening to the Sounds of Space-Time
- Author: Marcia Bartusiak
- Language: English
- Genre: Science journalism about astronomy and astrophysics
- Publisher: Joseph Henry Press
- Publication date: 2000
- Publication place: United States
- Media type: Print, e-book
- Pages: xii+249
- ISBN: 978-0-309-06987-8; 2000 hbk original edition Joseph Henry Press; ISBN 978-0-425-18620-6; 2003 pbk edition Berkley Books
- OCLC: 44632905

Einstein's Unfinished Symphony: Listening to the Sounds of Space-Time is a 2000 non-fiction book by Marcia Bartusiak about the preliminary work preceding operational efforts to detect the gravitational waves predicted by Einstein's theory of general relativity. She tells the story of LIGO's two gravitational-wave observatories in Louisiana and Washington State, with some mention of other such observatories in Italy, Germany, Japan, and Australia, and the scientists and scientific considerations involved. Initial LIGO operations between 2002 and 2010 did not detect any gravitational waves. After technical enhancements, gravitational waves were first detected in 2016. After the detection, Bartusiak wrote an updated version entitled Einstein's Unfinished Symphony: The Story of a Gamble, Two Black Holes, and a New Age of Astronomy published in 2017 by Yale University Press.

== Reception ==
For her 2000 book, Bartusiak won the 2001 American Institute of Physics Science Writing Award to a Journalist.

The route to LIGO was long and checkered; it is beautifully recounted by Marcia Bartusiak in her latest book, Einstein’s Unfinished Symphony. ... She has clearly made a great effort to interview all major players in the field, scan the literature, and capture the relevant science. What results is an easy-to-read and clear exposition of a field of physics that has, with minor brief and turbulent exceptions, remained far from the popular and professional limelight during much of its development. Readers of this book will come away with a clear idea of the challenges involved in detecting a signal that will move test masses located several kilometers apart by less than the width of a single atomic nucleus. In addition, they will meet the individuals who have at times single-handedly championed the field during the past three decades.

Bartusiak (Thursday's Universe) has been writing about gravity waves for more than a decade, and her familiarity with the search and the scientists involved results in a thorough, engrossing and valuable chronicle.
