= Amanda Gefter =

American science writer (born 1980)

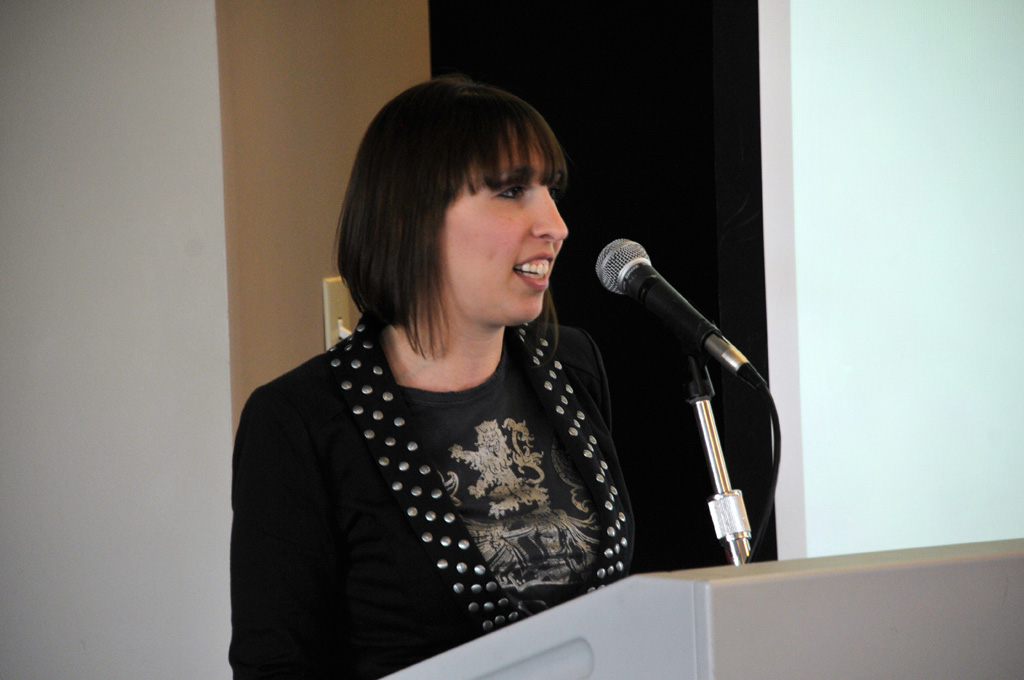
Gefter in 2010

Amanda Gefter (born 16 August 1980) is an American science writer, best known for her 2014 book Trespassing on Einstein's Lawn. The book won Physics World's 2015 book of the year award.

== Education and career ==
Amanda Gefter has a master's degree in the Philosophy and History of Science from the London School of Economics. For the academic year 2012–2013 she was a Knight Science Journalism Fellow at MIT.

Her articles, specializing in cosmology and fundamental physics, have been published in The New York Times, Nautilus, New Scientist, Scientific American, Nature, Sky and Telescope, and several other journals. She is a former co-director of the collaborative group NeuWrite Boston and a current co-host, with science journalist Dan Falk, of BookLab, a podcast about popular science books.

== Personal life ==
The pattern of Amanda Gefter's life has been influenced by an inherited circadian rhythm disorder called delayed sleep phase syndrome. She married Justin Smith in July 2017. Their relationship was dramatized in the Modern Love episode "The Night Girl Finds a Day Boy."

== Awards ==
- American Association for the Advancement of Science Kavli Science Journalism Award, 2015 for "The Man Who Tried to Redeem the World with Logic," Nautilus Magazine
