= Chris Woodford =

British author

- Born: 13 December 1966 (age 59); Birmingham
- Education: University of Cambridge
- Occupation: Author
- Writing career
- Language: English
- Subjects: Popular science; Children's non-fiction
- Notable awards: Science Writing Award; 2016
- Website: chriswoodford.com

Christopher J Woodford (born 13 December 1966) is a British science writer. He has written several dozen educational science books for adults and children, which have won multiple awards, been published in numerous languages, and collectively sold around 4 million copies.

== Writing ==
Woodford's 2015 book Atoms Under the Floorboards, which explains the science underpinning apparently mundane, everyday phenomena, won the 2016 American Institute of Physics Science Writing Award and was one of Physics World's Top 10 Books of the Year in 2015. It was published in English, worldwide, by Bloomsbury and in foreign-language editions in Russia, China, Taiwan, Poland, South Korea, Italy, Germany, and Vietnam. Woodford based the book around intriguing questions he received by email from readers of his popular science website (Explain that Stuff), such as how many pedalling hamsters you would need to generate enough energy to boil water for a cup of coffee.

Woodford set up the website in 2006; its articles have been downloaded over 100 million times and cited in hundreds of books and scientific papers.

Woodford began his career writing and editing children's science books, and wrote three best-selling titles in the Cool Stuff technology series for Dorling Kindersley. The third volume, Cool Stuff Exploded, won the National Science Teachers Association/CBC Outstanding Science Books Award for 2009 and was described by New Scientist as "a stunning reminder of the ingenuity behind innovations we all too often take for granted".

Woodford's other titles include Science: A Children's Encyclopedia with Steve Parker, published in 2014, and a volume about the social impacts of the Internet, published by ABC-Clio in 2005.

Apart from writing his own books, he has acted as a science consultant for other authors, including British TV scientists Richard Hammond, Robert Winston, and Johnny Ball, and the British-born American illustrator David Macaulay.

Woodford's 2021 book Breathless, about the global problem of air pollution, was picked as a book of the month by The Independent in March 2021 and its introduction featured as an illustrated centre-page spread article in The i newspaper the same month.

== Activism ==
Woodford describes himself as a "lifelong environmentalist" and, as an activist, has worked on a range of green issues. In the mid-1990s, he was a member of the campaign against the Newbury bypass, which the BBC described as "a fight between eco-warriors and police that caught the attention of a nation" and "a turning point in British protesting history".

During the campaign, Woodford documented evidence, which, he argued, showed English Nature (the statutory wildlife "watchdog") had deliberately sacrificed numerous protected habitats and species along the route of the road, including a colony of rare Desmoulin's whorl snails, which were "strictly protected" under European law. According to a later investigation by the Worldwide Fund for Nature (WWF): "Woodford sums up English Nature's involvement in Newbury as 'a catalogue of repeated failure to present a balanced view of the environmental impacts of the road... (these)... have played an important part in insuring the construction of one of the most environmentally destructive road proposals in the country.'" English Nature countered that it was "not a campaigning organization" but, in June 1996, in one of the final attempts to halt the road, the issue became the subject of a High Court legal challenge, led by Friends of the Earth. Although unsuccessful, this case turned the "Newbury snail" into a cause célèbre. The Judge, Mr Justice Sedley, described his own legal verdict as "regretful... for one can appreciate the force of the view that if the protection of the natural environment keeps coming second we shall end by destroying our own habitat." Some years later, Woodford ruefully told John Vidal in a Guardian interview how stopping the Newbury bypass had become a blinkered obsession for everyone involved but, more positively, also "a personal turning point, a huge thing where we felt we had really achieved something".

Woodford later spent "almost a decade" campaigning against a proposed road tunnel through the Stonehenge World Heritage Site. Woodford has also campaigned on various other "green" issues, including sustainable housing, opencast mining, air pollution and climate change.

Woodford's writing and activism often overlap; he regards failures to tackle environmental issues partly as problems of science communication. In his 2015 book Atoms Under the Floorboards, he wrote: "We confuse the ozone layer and climate change, we think nuclear power is more risky than crossing the road, and despite 70 per cent of us thinking that newspapers and TV sensationalise science, 86 per cent of us rely on precisely these unreliable media to keep us informed". He writes about green topics because he believes “communication about the environment is a major failure – possibly the biggest and most disastrous for the scientific community”. Woodford is, nevertheless, sceptical of what he calls "feel-good" (superficial) environmentalism, which he believes gets in the way of solving urgent problems such as pollution, because, as he told Neil Mackay in an interview in The Herald: "People see [it] as a sort of dilettantism".

Woodford grew up near Birmingham, UK and studied Natural Sciences at Cambridge University.

== Selected publications ==
=== Books for adults ===
- Woodford, Chris (2005). Poole, Hilary W. (ed.). The Internet: A Historical Encyclopedia: Issues. Santa Barbara, California: ABC-CLIO. ISBN 1851096590.
- Woodford, Chris (2015). Atoms Under the Floorboards: The Surprising Science Hidden in Your Home. London: Bloomsbury. ISBN 9781472923233.
- Woodford, Chris (2021). Breathless: Why Air Pollution Matters and How it Affects You. London: Icon. ISBN 9781785787102.

=== Books for children ===
- Woodford, Chris; Morgan, Ben (2005). How Cool Stuff Works. London: Dorling Kindersley. ISBN 9780756614652.
- Woodford, Chris; Woodcock, Jon (2007). The Gadget Book: How Really Cool Stuff Works. London: Dorling Kindersley. ISBN 9781405325820.
- Woodford, Chris (2008). Cool Stuff Exploded: Get Inside Modern Technology. London: Dorling Kindersley. ISBN 9780756640286.
- Woodford, Chris (2011). Arctic Tundra and Polar Deserts. Chicago: Heinemann-Raintree Books. ISBN 978-1-4329-4172-7.
- Woodford, Chris; Parker, Steve (2014). Science: A Visual Encyclopedia. London: Dorling Kindersley. ISBN 9781465434852.
