= Julie Segre =

American geneticist

Julie A. Segre
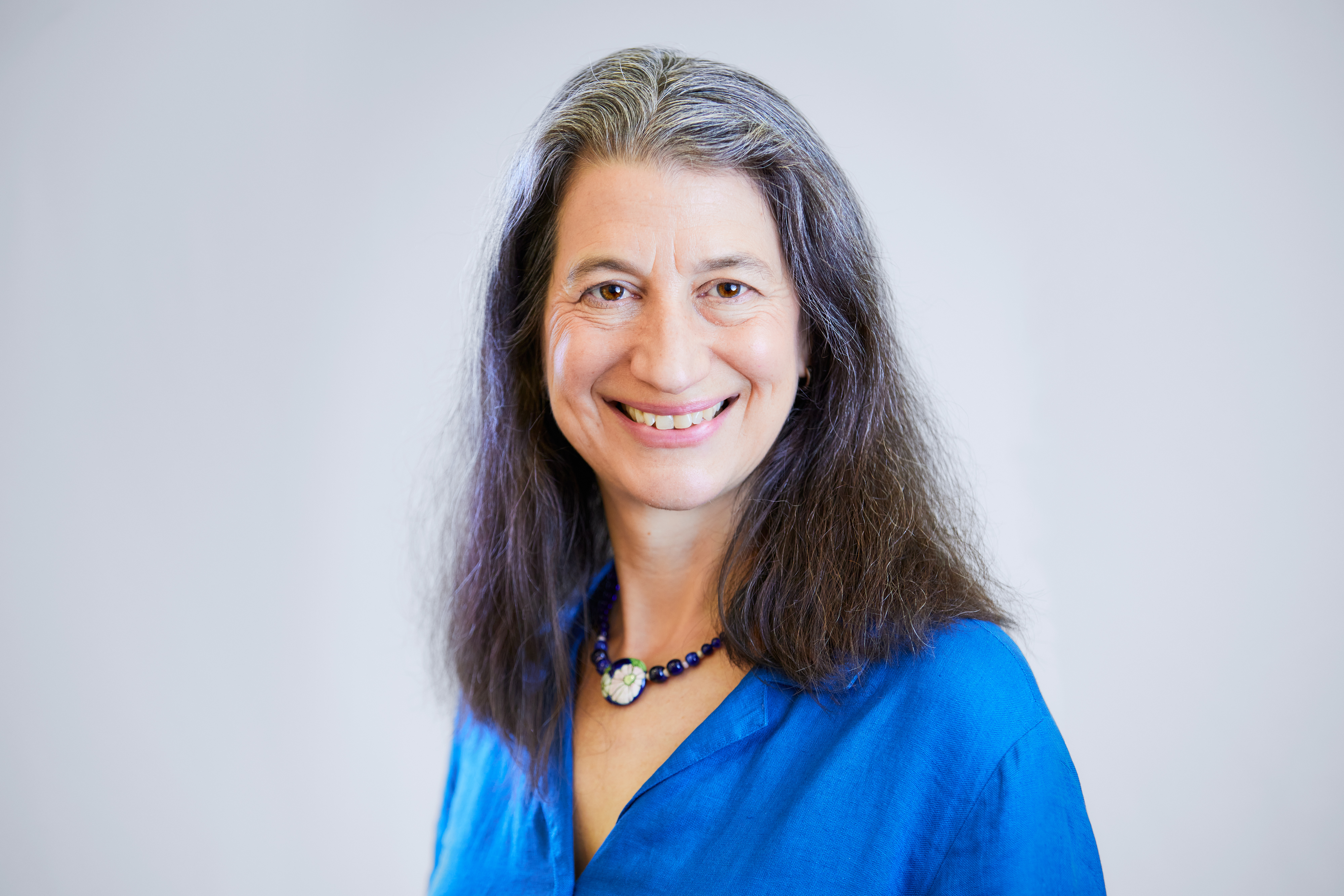
- Born: Berkeley, California, U.S.
- Education: Amherst College; MIT
- Known for: Foundational studies of the human skin associated microbes (bacteria, fungi, viruses, skin flora); Using DNA sequencing to track antibiotic-resistant bacteria in hospitals; NIH 'superbug' was thwarted with help of two scientists
- Father: Gino Segrè
- Relatives: Emilio Segrè (great uncle)
- Scientific career
- Fields: Microbial Genomics; Genetics and Molecular Biology
- Workplaces: National Human Genome Research Institute; National Institutes of Health
- Academic advisors: Eric Lander, Elaine Fuchs

Julie Angela Segre is an NIH Distinguished Investigator and Chief of the Translational and Functional Genomics Branch in the National Human Genome Research Institute at the National Institutes of Health. She was elected to the National Academy of Medicine in 2019, the American Academy of Arts and Sciences in 2020 and the National Academy of Sciences in 2022.

== Early life and education ==
Segre was born in Berkeley, California, the daughter of Nina and Gino Claudio Segrè. She was raised in Philadelphia, where her father was a professor of physics at the University of Pennsylvania. Segre received her B.A. summa cum laude in mathematics from Amherst College in 1987, where she later served on the board of trustees. She received her Ph.D. in 1996 from the Massachusetts Institute of Technology. Segre then performed postdoctoral training in Molecular Genetics and Cell Biology at the University of Chicago (1996–2000).

== Research and career ==
Segre came to the National Human Genome Research Institute of NIH in 2000 and was promoted to a senior investigator with tenure in 2007.

Segre's laboratory studies how the epidermis interfaces between the body and the environment. Using genomic methodologies, Segre studies the bacteria and microbes of the skin microbiome. Segre's laboratory also develops genomic tools to track hospital-acquired infections of multi-drug resistant organisms.

== Medical and research achievements ==
- 2013 received Service to America Medal
- 2015 elected as a Fellow to the American Academy of Microbiology
- 2019 elected to the National Academy of Medicine
- 2020 elected to the American Academy of Arts and Sciences
- 2022 elected to the National Academy of Sciences
- 2023 elected as a Fellow to the American Association for the Advancement of Science
