= MPPP (disambiguation) =

MPPP or Desmethylprodine, 1-Methyl-4-phenyl-4-propionoxypiperidine, is an opioid drug.

MPPP may also refer to:

- MαPPP, or 4'-Methyl-α-pyrrolidinopropiophenone, a stimulant analog of α-PPP
- Multilink PPP, a communications technology
