= Jon Palfreman =

American film producer

Jon Palfreman is a reporter, writer, producer, director and educator best known for his documentary work on Frontline and Nova. He has won awards for his journalism, including the Peabody Award, Emmy Award, the Alfred I. duPont-Columbia University Silver Baton, Writers Guild of America Award, and the AAAS-Westinghouse Science in Journalisim Award. Palfreman has written, directed and produced documentaries on a wide range of topics, but specializes in topical and often controversial issues involving science and medicine. Palfreman is the author of Brainstorms: The Race to Unlock the Mysteries of Parkinson's Disease, The Case of the Frozen Addicts: Working at the Edge of the Mysteries of the Human Brain (with J. William Langston), and The Dream Machine: Exploring the Computer Age (with Doron Swade). He is also president of the Palfreman Film Group.

== Background ==
Palfreman was born in England. He studied physics and the history and philosophy of science while attending university, earning a Bachelor of Science degree in Physics from University College London in 1971 and a Master of Science degree in history and social studies of science from the University of Sussex in 1972.

Palfreman earned a PhD in Communications at the University of Glamorgan (now the University of South Wales) in 2005.

Palfreman is currently a resident of Lexington, MA.

== Career ==
In the late 1970s until 1997, Palfreman worked as a science journalist, director and producer for the BBC in London and WGBH in Boston, MA.

In 1997, Palfreman started his own production company, the Palfreman Film Group.

While in Massachusetts, Palfreman served as adjunct professor at Tufts University (teaching a course in risk communication), Boston University and Suffolk University. He was also a trustee and board member of the Cambridge Center for Behavioral Studies.

In 2002, Palfreman, along with five other journalists, John Price, Robin D. Stone, Jonathan Cohn, Barry Meier, and Marc Schaffer, was selected as a 2002 Kaiser Media fellow.

In 2006, Palfreman was selected as a Nieman Fellow at Harvard University.

Palfreman held the position of KEZI Distinguished Professor of Broadcast Journalism at the University of Oregon from 2006 until 2015. His courses included: Reporting for Electronic Media, The Journalistic Interview, Mass Communication and Society, Reporting Science, Advanced Documentary, and Producing Story. He is currently an emeritus professor of journalism at the University of Oregon.

Ethics in journalism is about reporting without fear or favor. It is my duty to make sure students understand the difference between advocacy and journalism.

— Palfreman

In 2013, Palfreman joined the editorial board of the Journal of Parkinson's Disease as social media editor. Palfreman, himself, was diagnosed with Parkinson's disease, which he wrote about in The New York Times article, The Bright Side of Parkinson's and spoke about in the podcast interview The Mysteries of Parkinson's

== The Machine That Changed the World (TV Documentary) ==
The Machine That Changed the World, a five-hour PBS series for which Palfreman was executive director, tracks the origin of the computer from the 19th Century, when "computers" were human beings, to what was, by 1992, the development of machines so inexpensive that virtually anyone could own and use one. The series included conversations with Steve Jobs, Steve Wozniak, Thomas Watson, Jr., Bill Gates, and Marvin Minsky and covered topics such as the development of the U.S. computer industry, artificial intelligence (including Douglas Lenat's Cyc) and virtual reality. The series also recognized Konrad Zuse, John Mauchly, J. Presper Eckert, Maurice Wilkes, and Alan Turing for their contribution to advances in computer technology in the 20th century. In reviewing the series, Eric Mink of the St. Louis Post-Dispatch wrote: "What could have been a tangled mess of tubes, transistors, RAM, ROM, chips, bits and bytes instead is a story of a struggle against conventional thinking; of creative insight; of salesmanship and politics; of people taking risks and sometimes failing, sometimes succeeding beyond all expectations. And nothing brings a story to life more than being able to see and hear some of the people who made it happen." The Machine that Changed the World won the 1992 George Foster Peabody Award for excellence in "chronicling the history and impact of computing."

It is not an ordinary machine, like a car or washing machine. It is something special. When we thought about it more deeply, we realized it wasn't a machine, it was a new medium. It was more like the development of writing than the development of the automobile.

— Jon Palfreman

== Prisoners of Silence (TV Documentary) ==
In 1993, Palfreman produced an hour-long show exploring Facilitated Communication (FC), a technique being touted by some parents, teachers and mental health professionals as a way to "unlock the autistic mind" simply by supporting their child or client's hand while typing on a keyboard. However, his investigations into FC revealed that the claims of proponents, such as Douglas Biklen of Syracuse University, that these people with severe impairments could "actually write and think for themselves" were scientifically unfounded. Double-blind testing demonstrated that "when autism sufferers and facilitators were shown different objects, what was typed by the autistic person was what the facilitator saw". Further, throughout the United States, charges of sexual abuse were being leveled at parents and caregivers by facilitators using the technique whose communication partners were, later, found out to have no ability to read or write on their own. FC, often compared with the Ouija board, turned out to be a "poorly tested and researched technique that has given false hope to many," as well as raise "questions about both the human and professional capacity for self-delusion and the reliability of new information in the field of mental health care." Prisoners of Silence won an AAAS-Westinghouse Science Journalism Award in 1994, which Palfreman considered one of the most valuable awards he's received.

People today are deluged with claims that play on their hopes and fears, and that aren't actually based on anything of substance. Science journalists aren't afraid to engage in the details of science, to go in and bring some reason to these areas. [The AAAS awards] recognize this.

— Palfreman

== What's Up with the Weather? (TV Documentary) ==
In What's Up With the Weather, a 2000 Nova and Frontline documentary, Palfreman and his production team explored the science and politics behind climate change. In what critics described as a "sensible and realistic approach to an issue badly skewed by high emotion and low politics", Palfreman explores climatology and greenhouse gases, the extinction crisis, and alternatives to fossil fuel use. According to Palfreman, global warming is an issue that will "eclipse all the previous controversies over DDT, asbestos, toxic metals, radiation and even tobacco." What's Up with the Weather won the 1996 National Association of Science Writers Science in Society Award and the American Institute of Physics Award in 2001.

Global warming is the mother of all environmental debates.

— Palfreman

== The Harvest of Fear (TV Documentary) ==
The Harvest of Fear, written, directed and produced by Palfreman in 2001, is a Frontline and Nova co-production examining modern day agriculture and the benefits and risks of technology used to genetically modify food. The program explores the issues of pesticide use, world hunger, the risks of tampering with nature, "Frankenfoods", and the politics of applying biotechnology to food sources. The program also highlights (and sometimes challenges) opponents' concerns about "unforeseeable adverse medical and environmental effects." The Harvest of Fear won the Alfred I. duPont-Columbia University Silver Baton Award in 2002.

Basically, this is a story about the increasing power of science to alter our world and the fear this power generates.

— Palfreman

== The Case of the Frozen Addicts (Book) ==
The Case of the Frozen Addicts, co-written by Palfreman and J. William Langston, documents the medical investigation Langston undertook as a neurologist in a California hospital when, in 1982, he encountered several patients who suffered paralysis and an inability to speak. These symptoms caused the patients to appear "frozen". Langston eventually discovered that each of the patients had been exposed to a "designer drug", contaminated with MPTP which, he hypothesized, destroyed cells in the part of the brain called the substantia nigra and impaired the production of dopamine. This, in turn, caused symptoms very much like those seen in people with Parkinson's disease. Along with describing treatment approaches for the "frozen addicts" (some successful, some not), Palfreman and Langston also discuss the ethical, political, economic, and legal implications involved with researching treatments for devastating neurological disorders. The Case of the Frozen Addicts was published by Pantheon in 1995.

As a precursor to the book, Palfreman was introduced to the issues of Parkinson's disease during the development and production of two Nova documentaries: The Case of the Frozen Addicts (1986) and Brain Transplant (1992). The Case of the Frozen Addicts documentary won the following in 1986: Television Award, British Association for the Advancement of Science; AAAS/Westinghouse Science Journalism Award; Television Award, Glaxo Science Writers Award; Red Ribbon Award, American Film Festival; and Best Medical Film Award, Sci-Tech Festival.

Brain Transplant was nominated for an Emmy and a Writer's Guild Award in 1992.

== Brain Storms: The Race to Unlock the Mysteries of Parkinson's Disease (Book) ==
Brain Storms: The Race to Unlock the Mysteries of Parkinson's Disease, written by Palfreman and published by Scientific American / Farrar, Straus and Giroux, 2015, is "part scientific investigation, part medical detective story, and part memoir" focused on a disease first described in 1817 by James Parkinson and which now bears his name. Other scientists discussed in the book include: Jean-Martin Charcot, Constantin Tretiakoff, and Frederic Lewy. In the book, Palfreman provides readers with a historical account of Parkinson's, its symptoms and how it affects the brain, a scientific look at experimental treatments and medications, an overview of the current state of research, and personal and professional accounts of people affected by the disease (physicians, researchers, and those living with Parkinson's). Palfreman, who was diagnosed with Parkinson's while researching the book, reminds Parkinson's sufferers to educate themselves about their condition and current treatments, exercise, stay positive, participate in clinical trials, and advocate further research for drug companies dismissive of what they considered to be a non-life-threatening disease.

== Portland Countdown (podcast) ==
In June 2015, Palfreman, along with film producer and journalist Dave Iverson, began hosting a monthly limited-run podcast on the subject of Parkinson's disease research and treatment, In preparation for the 4th World Parkinson Congress to be held in Portland, Oregon in September, 2016. The podcast has had guests such as Andrew Lees, MD, Daniel Weintraub, MD, Dr. Lawrence I. Golbe, and Jeffrey Kordower, PhD. It covers topics from the basics of Parkinson's disease, to stopping disease progression, to Parkinson's and genetics.

== Books ==
- Brain Storms: The Race to Unlock the Mysteries of Parkinson's Disease (Scientific American/Farrar, Straus and Giroux, 2015) ISBN 978-0-374-11617-0
- The Case of the Frozen Addicts: Working at the Edge of the Mysteries of the Human Brain with J. William Langston (Pantheon, 1995) ISBN 978-0-679-74708-6
- The Dream Machine: Exploring the Computer Age (BBC Books, 1991) ISBN 978-0-563-36221-0

== Articles ==
- Cracking the Parkinson's Puzzle (Scientific American Mind, 2015)
- The Bright Side of Parkinson's (The New York Times, 2015)
- The Dark Legacy of FC (Evidence-Based Communication Assessment and Intervention, 2012)
- A Journalist's Letter from Academia (Nieman Report, 2011)
- Dealing with Disruption (Nieman Report, 2009)
- Atomic Masonry (Oregon Quarterly, 2007)
- Caught in the Web (Nieman Report, 2006)
- The Rise and Fall of Power Line EMFs: The Anatomy of a Magnetic Controversy (Review of Policy Research, 2006)
- A Tale of Two Fears: Exploring Media Depictions of Nuclear Power and Global Warming (Review of Policy Research, 2006)
- Bringing Science to a Television Audience (Nieman Reports, 2002)
- Sending Messages Nobody Wants to Hear: a Primer on Risk Communication (AgBioForum, 2001)
- Apocalypse not. (Cover Story) (Technology Review, 1996)
- The Australian Origins of Facilitated Communication. In H. Shane (editor) Facilitated Communication: the clinical and cultural phenomena. (Singular, 1994)
- Between Scepticism and Credulity: A Study of Victorian Scientific Attitudes to Modern Spiritualism (Sociological Review, 1979)
- Mesmerism and the English Medical Profession: A Study of Conflict (Ethics in Science and Medicine, 1977)
- William Crookes: Spiritualism and Science (Ethics in Science and Medicine, 1976)

== Lectures ==
- Sick Around the World, sponsored by Health Care for All Oregon, Eugene, Oregon (November 2013)
- The annual Cary Lecture Series, Cary Hall, Lexington, MA (September 2011)
- Combating Global Yawning: Overcoming Public Indifference to the Environment, University of Rhode Island (June 2004)

== Select Frontline and Nova Productions ==
- Nuclear Aftershocks (Frontline, 2012)
- The Vaccine War (Frontline, 2010)
- Sick Around the World (PBS, 2008)
- Harvest of Fear (Frontline and Nova, April 2001)
- The Battle of City Springs (Palfreman Film Group, 2000)
- What's Up with the Weather? (Frontline and Nova, 2000)
- Stealing Time: The New Science of Aging (Frontline, 1999)
- Last Battle of the Gulf War (Frontline, 1998)
- Nuclear Reaction (Frontline, 1997)
- Siamese Twins (Nova, 1995)
- Breast Implants on Trial (Frontline, 1996)
- Waco: The Inside Story (Frontline, 1995)
- Currents of Fear (Frontline, 1995)
- The Nicotine War (Frontline, 1995)
- Siamese Twins (Nova, 1995)
- AIDS Research: The Story So Far (Frontline, 1994)
- Prisoners of Silence (Frontline, 1993)
- Brain Transplant (Nova, 1992)
- The Machine That Changed the World (Nova, 1992)
- Pioneers of Surgery (Nova, 1988)

== Awards ==
- American Institute of Physics Science Writing Award for WNET's production of Light Speed (2005)
- duPont-Columbia University Silver Baton Award for Frontline, Nova, and the Palfreman Film Group production of Harvest of Fear (2002)
- Victor Cohn Prize for excellence in medical writing (2001)
- Science in Society Award (1996) for the Frontline and Nova production of What's Up With the Weather? (2001)
- Effective Presentation of Behavior Analysis in the Mass Media Award (2002)
- Science in Society Award (1998) for the Frontline production of Gulf War Syndrome (1998)
- Emmy Award for the Nova production of Siamese Twins (1997)
- Science Journalism Award presented by the American Association for the Advancement of Science for the Frontline production of Breast Implants on Trial (1996)
- Writers Guild of America Award in the television documentary, current events category for AIDS Research: The Story So Far, PBS (1995)
- AAAS-Westinghouse Science Journalism Award for the Frontline production of Prisoners of Silence (1994)
- Westinghouse Science Journalism Award for radio and television science journalism on Nova's The Case of the Frozen Addicts with Paul S. Apsell (1986)
