= American Eclipse (book) =

Book by David Baron

- Author: David Baron
- Subject: American history, history of science
- Publisher: 2017 (Liveright)
- Pages: 349
- ISBN: 978-1-63149-016-3

American Eclipse: A Nation's Epic Race to Catch the Shadow of the Moon and Win the Glory of the World is a non-fiction book by journalist David Baron, published by Liveright in 2017, about the popular impression of the 1878 solar eclipse as observed across the United States. It won the American Institute of Physics Science Writing Award in 2018.

== Background ==
Baron was inspired to write the book after viewing his first total solar eclipse in Aruba in 1998. He decided that he would publish it in 2017 in order to coincide with the solar eclipse of August 21, 2017.

== Synopsis ==
American Eclipse follows three scientists, James Craig Watson, Maria Mitchell, and Thomas Edison as they traveled to view the total solar eclipse on July 29, 1878.

== Reception ==
Kirkus Reviews described American Eclipse as a "compelling... timely, energetic combination of social and scientific history." Graham Ambrose, writing for The Denver Post, lauded Baron's social history of a scientific topic and that Baron "successfully swerves from the dry, impenetrable prose of science writing, grasping instead at something poetic, often funny."

== Publication ==
American Eclipse was released in hardcover in June 2017, paperback in 2018, and rereleased with a new afterword in 2024, to coincide with the solar eclipse of April 8, 2024. The book was also adapted into a musical in and premiered at Baylor University on April 7, 2024.
