= David Baron (author) =

American science journalist and author

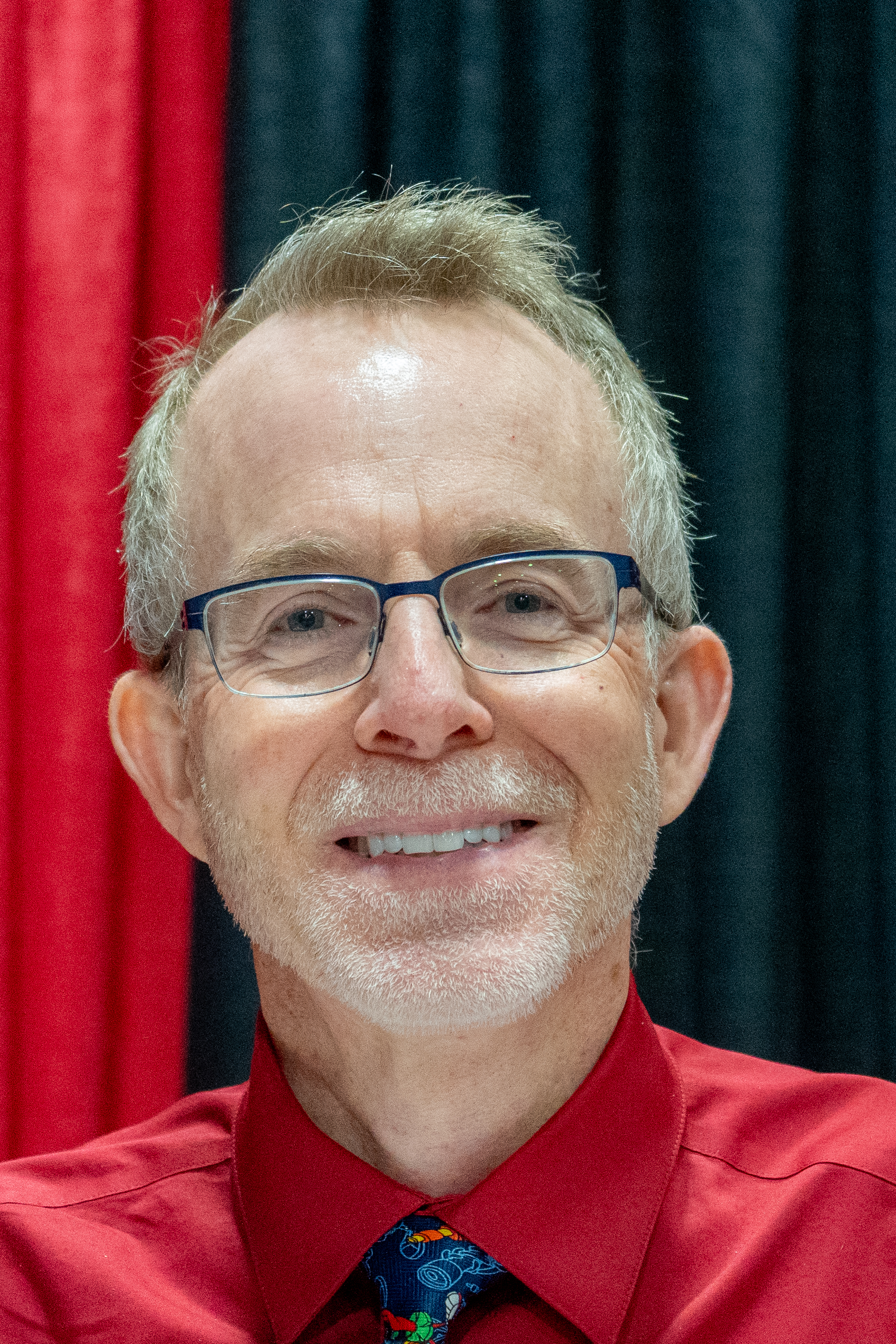
- Baron at the National Book Festival 2025
- Education: Yale University
- Occupations: Author, journalist, broadcaster
- Notable work: American Eclipse

David Baron is an American author, journalist, broadcaster, and public speaker who specializes in writing about science, particularly astronomy and environmental topics.

== Early life and education ==
He majored in physics at Yale University before continuing his education with fellowships at MIT, the University of Colorado, and Arizona State University.

== Career ==
Baron spent more than two decades working in public radio. He began as a science reporter for WBUR in Boston, and later served as science correspondent for National Public Radio and as health and science editor for the public radio program The World.

Baron's journalism has earned him multiple awards, including the Lowell Thomas Award from the Overseas Press Club of America, the duPont‑Columbia Award, the National Academies Communications Award.

He is also known as an avid eclipse chaser and has appeared on programs such as CBS Sunday Morning.

== Books ==
- The Beast in the Garden: A Modern Parable of Man and Nature (2003)
- American Eclipse: A Nation's Epic Race to Catch the Shadow of the Moon and Win the Glory of the World (2017)
- The Martians: The True Story of an Alien Craze that Captured Turn-of-the-Century America (2025)
