= Marcia Bartusiak =

American writer, journalist, and academic

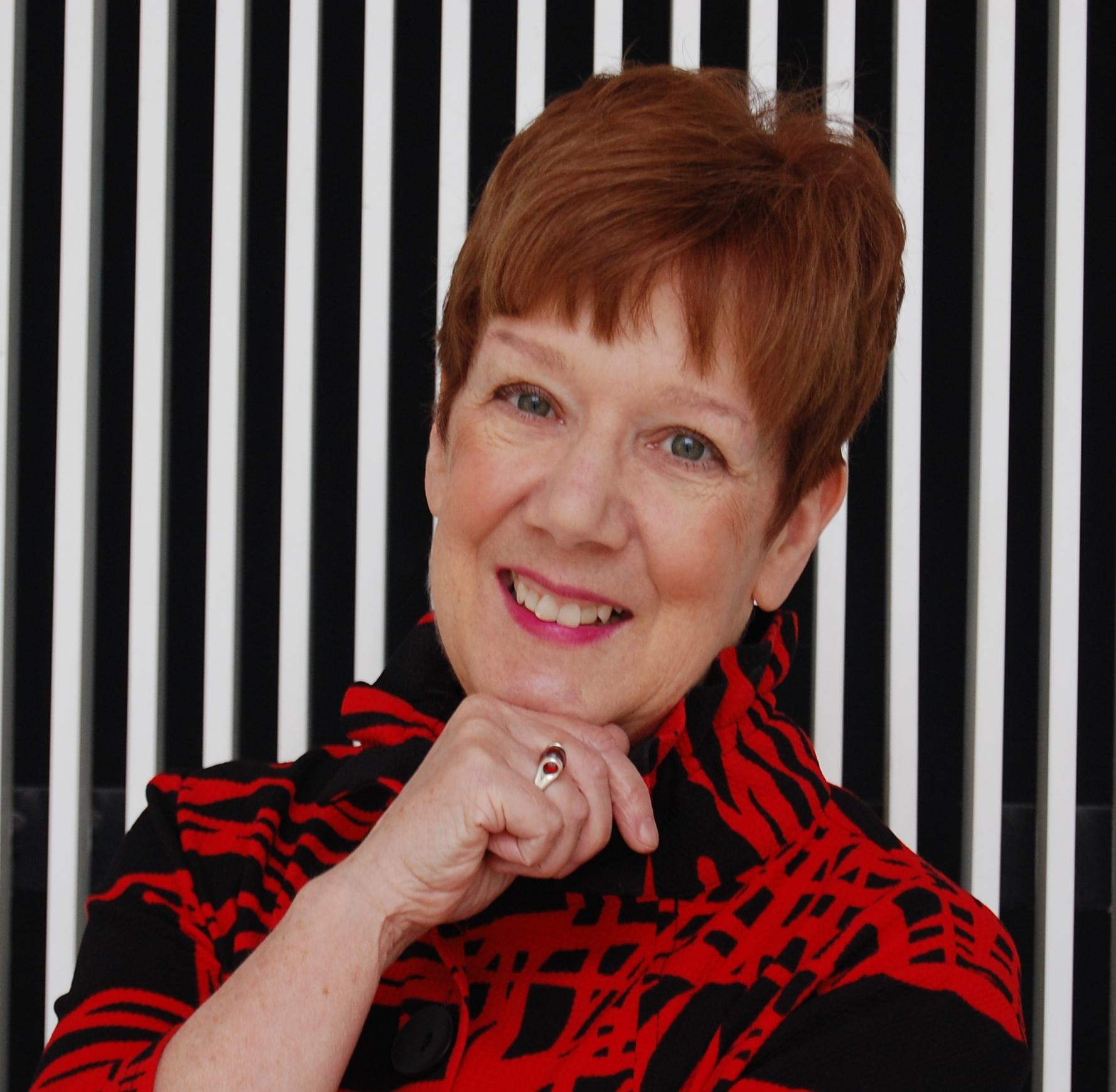
- Marcia Bartusiak in September 2017
- Occupations: Journalist; Academic
- Known for: Science writing, Teaching
- Awards: American Institute of Physics Science Writing Award (1982, 2001, 2019), History of Science Society Davis Prize (2010), American Institute of Physics Gemant Award (2006), Fellow of the AAAS (2008), Astronomical Society of the Pacific's Klumpke-Roberts Award (2010), NASA Journalist-In-Space Finalist (1987), Sigma Xi Distinguished Lectureship (2022–23)

Marcia F. Bartusiak is an author, journalist, and Professor of the Practice Emeritus of the Graduate Program in Science Writing at the Massachusetts Institute of Technology. Trained in both communications (B.A. from American University, 1971) and physics (M.S. from Old Dominion University, 1979), she writes about the fields of astronomy and physics. Bartusiak has been published in National Geographic, Discover, Astronomy, Sky & Telescope, Science, Popular Science, World Book Encyclopedia, Smithsonian, and MIT Technology Review. The author of seven books, she has also worked as a columnist for Natural History magazine.

== Education and career ==
Bartusiak started her career in 1971 as the first female reporter at WVEC-TV (ABC affiliate) in Norfolk, Virginia. She was the station's first female anchor before leaving in 1975 to begin a graduate education in physics. After receiving her master's degree, she became a charter member of the writing staff of Discover magazine, when it first started up in 1980, and then began a freelance science-writing career in 1982. In 2003, she joined the faculty of the MIT Graduate Program in Science Writing, retiring in 2019 as a professor emeritus.

== Books ==
- Dispatches from Planet 3, a collection of cosmological essays
- Einstein's Unfinished Symphony, a narrative overview of the new field of gravitational-wave astronomy
- Black Hole: How an Idea Abandoned by Newtonians, Hated by Einstein, and Gambled on by Hawking Became Loved
- Through a Universe Darkly, a history of astronomers' centuries-long quest to discover the universe's composition
- Thursday's Universe, a layman's guide to the frontiers of astrophysics and cosmology
- The Day We Found the Universe, a narrative saga of the birth of modern cosmology
- Archives of the Universe, a history of the major discoveries in astronomy told through 100 of the original scientific publications

== Awards ==
Bartusiak won the American Institute of Physics Science Writing Award three times:

- 1982 for The Ultimate Timepiece in Discover Magazine
- 2001 for Einstein's Unfinished Symphony
- 2019 for Dispatches from Planet 3.

In 2010 her book The Day We Found the Universe won the History of Science Society's Watson Davis and Helen Miles Davis Prize. The same year she was awarded the Klumpke-Roberts Award by the Astronomical Society of the Pacific.

Bartusiak won the 2006 American Institute of Physics Andrew W. Gemant Award. "The Andrew Gemant Award recognizes the accomplishments of a person who has made significant contributions to the cultural, artistic, or humanistic dimension of physics given annually."

In 2008 she was elected a Fellow of the American Association for the Advancement of Science for “exceptionally clear communication of the rich history, the intricate nature, and the modern practice of astronomy to the public at large" and was also chosen to be a 2022–23 Distinguished Lecturer for Sigma Xi, the scientific research honor society.

== Bibliography ==
Year	Title	Publisher	Subject matter
1986	Thursday's Universe	Random House	Astronomy and Astrophysics
1993	Through a Universe Darkly	HarperCollins	History of Astronomy
2000	Einstein's Unfinished Symphony: Listening to the Sounds of Space-Time	Joseph Henry Press	Astronomy
2004	Archives of the Universe: A Treasury of Astronomy's Historic Works of Discovery	Pantheon Books	History of Astronomy
2009	The Day We Found the Universe	Pantheon Books	History of Astronomy
2015	Black Hole	Yale University Press	History of Astronomy
2017	Einstein's Unfinished Symphony: The Story of a Gamble, Two Black Holes, and a New Age of Astronomy	Yale University Press	Astronomy and Astrophysics
2018	Dispatches from Planet 3	Yale University Press	Astronomy and Astrophysics
