= Copenhagen Institute =

Danish free market think tank

The Copenhagen Institute is a Danish free market think tank. It was founded in 2003 hosting a conference on tax competition. It has a clear libertarian leaning.

The Copenhagen Institute was originally called MarkedsCentret, but changed its name in 2005.

The think tank works on policy areas such as: Tax & Welfare, Health Care & Food, Competition & Regulation and Environment & Technology.

The think tank was founded by Chresten Anderson, who previously worked for the Cato Institute in Washington DC.
