= Dan Falk =

Canadian science journalist, broadcaster, and author

- Born: 1966 (age 58–59)
- Education: Ryerson University; University of Toronto
- Website: Official website

Dan Falk (born 1966) is a Canadian science journalist, broadcaster, and author. He has written for The Globe and Mail, the Toronto Star, The Walrus, Cottage Life, SkyNews, Astronomy and New Scientist, and has contributed to the CBC radio programs Ideas, Quirks and Quarks, Tapestry and Spark.

== Biography ==
Falk received a BSc in physics from Dalhousie University in 1990, and a bachelor's degree in journalism from Ryerson University in 1992. In 2014 he graduated from the University of Toronto with an MA in the history and philosophy of science. His maternal grandfather was the artist Moi Ver.

For the academic year 2011–2012 he was a Knight Science Journalism Fellow at MIT.

His book Universe on a T-Shirt: The Quest for the Theory of Everything was the winner of the 2002 Science in Society Journalism Award from the Canadian Science Writers’ Association, as well as the John and Margaret Savage First Book Award, part of the Atlantic Book Awards. In 2015, Falk was the winner of the Science in Society Journalism Award for his article "Getting Smarter" in the University of Toronto Magazine. In 2019, Falk was the winner of the Sandford Fleming Medal for Excellence in Science Communication, awarded by the Royal Canadian Institute for Science.

With Amanda Gefter, Falk hosts the podcast BookLab, which looks at "the latest in popular science writing."

The asteroid (20039) Danfalk is named after him.

== Bibliography ==
=== Books ===
- Falk, Dan (2004). Universe on a T-Shirt: The Quest for the Theory of Everything. New York: Arcade Pub. ISBN 978-1-61145-460-4. OCLC 798928945.
- — (2008). In Search of Time: Journeys Along a Curious Dimension. Toronto: McClelland & Stewart/St. Martin's Press. ISBN 978-0-7710-4757-2.
- — (2014). The Science of Shakespeare: A New Look at the Playwright's Universe. New York: Macmillan. ISBN 978-1-250-00877-0. OCLC 846545902.

=== Articles ===
- Falk, Dan (January 2013). "Time warped". Phenomenon. Smithsonian. 43 (9): 16.
- — (17 June 2015). "Getting Smarter". University of Toronto Magazine.
- — (5 January 2022). "Readers Love Curious George. I Fell in Love with the Author's Astronomy Books". Nautilus. (About H. A. Rey's The Stars: A New Way to See Them.)
