= Transformity =

In 1996 H.T. Odum defined transformity as,

"the emergy of one type required to make a unit of energy of another type. For example, since 3 coal emjoules (cej) of coal and 1 cej of services are required to generate 1 J of electricity, the coal transformity of electricity is 4 cej/J"

The concept of transformity was first introduced by David M. Scienceman in collaboration with Howard T. Odum. In 1987 Scienceman proposed that the phrases, "energy quality", "energy quality factor", and "energy transformation ratio", all used by H.T. Odum, be replaced by the word "transformity" (p. 261). This approach aims to solve a long-standing issue about the relation of qualitative phenomena to quantitative phenomena often analysed in the physical sciences, which in turn is a synthesis of rationalism with phenomenology. That is to say that it aims to quantify quality.

== Transformity: the rationalization of quality ==
=== Definition of transformity in words ===
Scienceman then defined transformity as,

"a quantitative variable describing the measurable property of a form of energy, its ability to amplify as feedback, relative to the source energy consumed in its formation, under maximum power conditions. As a quantitative variable analogous to thermodynamic temperature, transformity requires specification of units." (1987, p. 261. My emphasis).

In 1996 H.T. Odum defined transformity as,

"the emergy of one type required to make a unit of energy of another type. For example, since 3 coal emjoules (cej) of coal and 1 cej of services are required to generate 1 J of electricity, the coal transformity of electricity is 4 cej/J"

G.P. Genoni expanded on this definition and maintained that, "the energy input of one kind required to sustain one unit of energy of another kind, is used to quantify hierarchical position" (1997, p. 97). According to Scienceman, the concept of transformity introduces a new basic dimension into physics (1987, p. 261). However, there is ambiguity in the dimensional analysis of transformity as Bastianoni et al. (2007) state that transformity is a dimensionless ratio.

=== Definition as a ratio ===
One part of the rationalist viewpoint associated with modernity and science is to contrast qualitatively different phenomena under transformation through quantitative ratios, with the aim of uncovering any constancy amidst the transformation change. Like the efficiency ratio, transformity is quantitatively defined by a simple input-output ratio. However the transformity ratio is the inverse of efficiency and involves both indirect and direct energy flows rather than simply direct input-output energy ratio of energy efficiency. This is to say that it is defined as the ratio of emergy input to energy output.

Original version:: $\mbox{Transformity} = \frac{\mbox{emergy input}}{\mbox{energy output}}$

=== Development ===
However, it was realised that the term "energy output" refers to both the useful energy output and the non-useful energy output. (Note: that as given by P.K. Nag, an alternative name for 'useful energy' is 'availability' or exergy, and an alternative name for 'non-useful energy' is 'unavailability', or anergy (Nag 1984, p. 156)). But as E. Sciubba and S. Ulgiati observed, the notion of transformity meant to capture the emergy invested per unit product, or useful output. The concept of Transformity was therefore further specified as the ratio of "input emergy dissipated (availability used up)" to the "unit output exergy" (Sciubba and Ulgiati 2005, p. 1957). For Jørgensen (2000, p. 61) transformity is a strong indicator of the efficiency of the system.

Revised version: $\mbox{Transformity} = \frac{\mbox{emergy input}}{\mbox{exergy output}}$ or $Tr = \frac{E_m}{E_x}$ (after Giannantoni 2002, p. 8).

Substituting in the mathematical definition of emergy given in that article.

$$Tr = \frac {\int_{t=-\infty}^{t_0} P_x \, dt}{E_x}$$

== Contemporary development ==
=== Two transformities ===
Albertina Lourenci and João Antonio Zuffo from the Department of Electronic Systems Engineering at São Paulo have posited that there are two transformity values; $Tr_{ex}$ and $Tr_{theta}$ (Lourenci and Zuffo 2004, p. 411).

- $Tr_{ex}$: compensates for the dissipation of exergy, and is defined in words as the Quality Factor which takes into account the emerging Quality associated to other forms of Energy
- $Tr_{theta}$: accounts for the increase of Transformity as a consequence of the Emergy generated by the Source Terms of the Universe

We may assert that while the term $Tr_{ex}$ takes into account the quantitative aspect of information, the term $Tr_{theta}$ accounts for the Quality aspect of such information.

Under these definitions "emergy" can always be structured as follows:

$Em_U= Tr_{theta}.Tr_{ex}.Ex_U$
