= World energy supply and consumption =

Global production and usage of energy

Global energy consumption, measured in exajoules per year: Coal, oil, and natural gas remain the primary global energy sources even as renewables have begun rapidly increasing.

Primary energy consumption by source (worldwide) from 1965 to 2020

World energy supply and consumption refers to the global supply of energy resources and the consumption of those resources. The system of global energy supply consists of the development, refinement, and trade of energy. Energy supplies may exist in various forms such as raw resources or more processed and refined forms of energy. The raw energy resources include for example coal, unprocessed oil and gas, uranium. In comparison, the refined forms of energy include for example refined oil that can be used as fuel or to generate electricity. Energy resources may be used in various different ways, depending on the specific resource (e.g. coal), and intended end use (industrial, residential, etc.). Energy production and consumption play a significant role in the global economy. It is needed in industry and global transportation. The total energy supply chain, from production to final consumption, involves many activities that cause a loss of useful energy.

Total energy consumption tends to increase by about 1–2% per year. As of 2022, 80% of energy consumption is derived from fossil fuels. More recently, renewable energy has been growing rapidly, averaging about a 20% increase per year in the 2010s.

Two key problems with energy production and consumption are greenhouse gas emissions and environmental pollution. Of the approximately 50 billion tonnes of worldwide annual greenhouse gas emissions, 36 billion tonnes of carbon dioxide was a result of energy use (almost all from fossil fuels) in 2021. Many scenarios have been envisioned to reduce greenhouse gas emissions, usually by the name of net zero emissions.

There is a clear connection between energy consumption per capita, and GDP per capita. As such, richer and more industrialized countries consume significantly more energy per person when compared to lower-income countries.

The Gulf States and Russia are major energy exporters, due to their large petroleum and natural gas reserves. Their customers include the European Union and China.

A significant lack of energy supplies is called an energy crisis.

== Primary energy production ==
World total primary energy consumption by type in 2020
1. Oil (31.2%)
2. Coal (27.2%)
3. Natural Gas (24.7%)
4. Hydro (renewables) (6.90%)
5. Nuclear (4.30%)
6. Others (renewables) (5.70%)

World map with primary energy use per person in 2021

Primary energy refers to the first form of energy encountered, as raw resources collected directly from energy production, before any conversion or transformation of the energy occurs.

Energy production is usually classified as:

- Fossil, using coal, crude oil, and natural gas;
- Nuclear, using uranium;
- Renewable, using biomass, geothermal, hydropower, solar, wind, tidal, and wave, among others.

Primary energy assessment by IEA follows certain rules (Note: IEA calculates primary energy of electrical power plants like so: Fossil: based on lower heating value.; Nuclear: heat produced by nuclear reactions (3 times the electric energy produced, assuming a nuclear plant efficiency of 33%).; Renewable: Biomass: based on lower heating value.; Hydropower, wind turbines and solar panels: electrical energy produced.; Geothermal power: more than 10 times the electric energy produced, assuming a plant efficiency of less than 10%.; See, chapter 7) to ease measurement of different kinds of energy. These rules are controversial. For hydro and wind turbines and solar panels, "primary energy" is defined as the electric energy produced, rather than as the energy in the water and air flows and sunlight that power them. But for fossil and nuclear power plants, "primary energy" is defined as the reaction heat, which is about three times the electric energy. This measurement difference can lead to underestimating the economic contribution of renewable energy.

The following table lists worldwide primary energy production broken down by country (the seventeen listed account for 76% of the global total) in 2021, using Enerdata. The amounts are rounded and given in million tonnes of oil equivalent per year (1 Mtoe = 11.63 TWh or 41.9 petajoules) and percent of the national total. Renewables includes biomass, hydro, wind, and solar. The above-mentioned underestimation of hydro, wind and solar energy, compared to nuclear and fossil energy, applies also to Enerdata.

The 2021 world total energy production of 14,800 MToe corresponds to a little over 172 PWh / year, or about 19.6 TW of power generation.

Largest primary energy producers (76% of world production) as of 2021, given in million tonnes of oil equivalent per year
	Total (MToe)	Coal	Oil & gas	Renewable	Nuclear
China	2,950	71%	13%	10%	6%
United States	2,210	13%	69%	8%	10%
Russia	1,516	16%	78%	2%	4%
Saudi Arabia	610	0	100%	0	0
Iran	354	0	99%	0	1%
United Arab Emirates	218	0	99%	0	1%
India	615	50%	11%	33%	6%
Canada	536	5%	81%	10%	4%
Indonesia	451	69%	17%	14%	0
Australia	423	64%	33%	3%	0
Brazil	325	1%	55%	42%	2%
Nigeria	249	0	47%	53%	0
Algeria	150	0	100%	0	0
South Africa	151	91%	1%	8%	0
Norway	214	0	93%	7%	0
France	128	0	1%	34%	65%
Germany	102	27%	3%	47%	23%
World	14800	27%	53%	13%	7%

2024 world electricity generation by source in terawatt-hours (TWh). Total generation was 30.85 petawatt-hours.
1. Coal 10,587 (34.4%)
2. Natural gas 6,796 (22.1%)
3. Hydro 4,417 (14.4%)
4. Nuclear 2,765 (8.99%)
5. Wind 2,497 (8.12%)
6. Solar 2,130 (6.92%)
7. Other 1,569 (5.10%)

== Energy conversion ==
Nation	Export minus Import in 2021 (MToe)
Russia	682
Saudi Arabia	388
Australia	296
Canada	245
Indonesia	226
Norway	185
Italy	-114
Turkey	-118
Germany	-187
South Korea	-239
India	-323
Japan	-357
China	-803

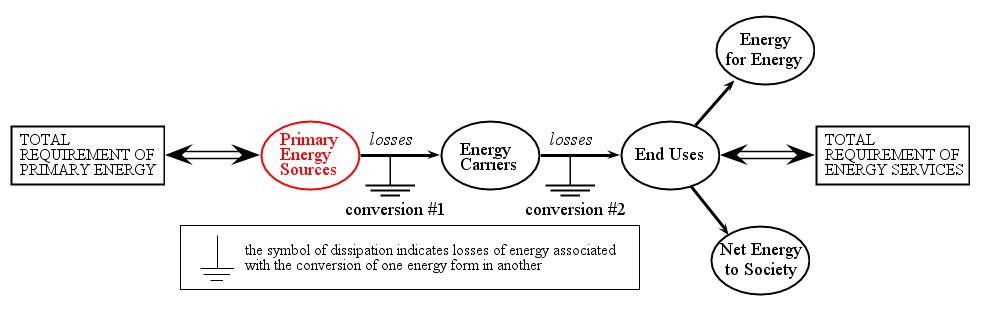
Primary energy sources are transformed by the energy sector to generate energy carriers.

Energy resources must be processed in order to make them suitable for final consumption. For example, there may be various impurities in raw coal mined or raw natural gas that was produced from an oil well that may make it unsuitable to be burned in a power plant.

Primary energy is converted in many ways to energy carriers, also known as secondary energy:

- Coal mainly goes to thermal power stations. Coke is derived by destructive distillation of bituminous coal.
- Crude oil goes mainly to oil refineries
- Natural-gas goes to natural-gas processing plants to remove contaminants such as water, carbon dioxide and hydrogen sulfide, and to adjust the heating value. It is used as fuel gas, also in thermal power stations.
- Nuclear reaction heat is used in thermal power stations.
- Biomass is used directly or converted to biofuel.

Electricity generators are driven by steam or gas turbines in a thermal plant, or water turbines in a hydropower station, or wind turbines, usually in a wind farm. The invention of the solar cell in 1954 started electricity generation by solar panels, connected to a power inverter. Mass production of panels around the year 2000 made this economic.

== Energy trade ==
Much primary and converted energy is traded among countries. The table lists countries with large difference of export and import in 2021, expressed in Mtoe. A negative value indicates that much energy import is needed for the economy. Russian gas exports were reduced a lot in 2022, as pipelines to Asia plus LNG export capacity is much less than the gas no longer sent to Europe.

Transport of energy carriers is done by tanker ship, tank truck, LNG carrier, rail freight transport, pipeline and by electric power transmission.

== Total energy supply ==
Total energy supply by fuel in 2024 in exajoules (EI, 2025) (energy sources in the chart are ordered according to their carbon intensity)
1. Coal 165.06 (27.9%)
2. Oil 199.05 (33.6%)
3. Natural gas 148.6 (25.1%)
4. Nuclear 30.74 (5.19%)
5. Hydro 16.03 (2.71%)
6. Renewables 32.74 (5.53%)

Total energy supply (TES) indicates the sum of production and imports subtracting exports and storage changes. For the whole world TES nearly equals primary energy (PE) because imports and exports cancel out, but for countries TES and PE differ in quantity, and also in quality as secondary energy is involved, e.g., import of an oil refinery product. TES is all energy required to supply energy for end users.

Total energy supply and primary energy (in Mtoe)
	TES	PE
China	3,650	2,950
India	927	615
Russia	811	1,516
Japan	400	52
South Korea	298	151
Canada	289	536
Germany	286	102
Saudi Arabia	219	610

World TES history (in million tons of oil equivalent)
Year	TES
1990	8,700
2000	9,900
2010	12,600
2019	14,400
2020	13,800
2021	14,500

The tables list TES and PE for some countries where these differ much, both in 2021 and TES history. Most growth of TES since 1990 occurred in Asia. The amounts are rounded and given in Mtoe. Enerdata labels TES as Total energy consumption.

25% of worldwide primary production is used for conversion and transport, and 6% for non-energy products like lubricants, asphalt and petrochemicals. In 2019 TES was 606 EJ and final consumption was 418 EJ, 69% of TES. Most of the energy lost by conversion occurs in thermal electricity plants and the energy industry own use.

=== Discussion about energy loss ===
World total primary energy consumption by type in 2024 (substitution method)
1. Oil (31.8%)
2. Coal (26.4%)
3. Natural Gas (23.7%)
4. Nuclear (3.95%)
5. Hydro (renewables) (6.25%)
6. Wind (renewables) (3.52%)
7. Solar (renewables) (2.96%)
8. Others (renewables) (1.42%)

There are different qualities of energy. Heat, especially at a relatively low temperature, is low-quality energy of random motion, whereas electricity is high-quality energy that flows smoothly through wires. It takes around 3 kWh of heat to produce 1 kWh of electricity. But by the same token, a kilowatt-hour of this high-quality electricity can be used to pump several kilowatt-hours of heat into a building using a heat pump. It turns out that the loss of useful energy incurred in thermal electricity plants is very much more than the loss due to, say, resistance in power lines, because of quality differences. Electricity can also be used in many ways in which heat cannot.

In fact, the loss in thermal plants is due to poor conversion of chemical energy of fuel to motion by combustion. Otherwise chemical energy of fuel is not inherently low-quality; for example, conversion of chemical energy to electricity in batteries can approach 100%. So energy loss in thermal plants is real loss.

One way to account for this difference and to compare them is via the substitution method. High quality energy is measured according to the amount of low-quality energy that would be needed to produce it.

== Final consumption ==
World total final consumption of 9,717 Mtoe by region in 2017 (IEA, 2019)
1. OECD (38.2%)
2. Middle East (5.10%)
3. Non-OECD Eurasia (7.50%)
4. China (20.6%)
5. Rest of Asia (13.5%)
6. Non-OECD Americas (4.80%)
7. Africa (6.10%)
8. International aviation and marine bunkers (4.20%)

Total final consumption (TFC) is the worldwide consumption of energy by end-users (whereas primary energy consumption (Eurostat) or total energy supply (IEA) is total energy demand and thus also includes what the energy sector uses itself and transformation and distribution losses). This energy consists of fuel (78%) and electricity (22%). The tables list amounts, expressed in million tonnes of oil equivalent per year (1 Mtoe = 11.63 TWh) and how much of these is renewable energy. Non-energy products are not considered here. The data are of 2018. The world's renewable share of TFC was 18% in 2018: 7% traditional biomass, 3.6% hydropower and 7.4% other renewables.

In the period 2005–2017 worldwide final consumption of coal increased by 23%, of oil and gas increased by 18%, and that of electricity increased by 41%.

Fuel comes in three types: Fossil fuel is natural gas, fuel derived from petroleum (LPG, gasoline, kerosene, gas/diesel, fuel oil), or from coal (anthracite, bituminous coal, coke, blast furnace gas). Secondly, there is renewable fuel (biofuel and fuel derived from waste). And lastly, the fuel used for district heating.

The amounts of fuel in the tables are based on lower heating value.

The first table lists final consumption in the countries/regions which use most (85%), and per person as of 2018. In developing countries fuel consumption per person is low and more renewable. Canada, Venezuela and Brazil generate most electricity with hydropower.

Final consumption in most using countries and per person (as of 2018)
	Fuel Mtoe	of which renewable	Electricity Mtoe	of which renewable	TFC pp toe
China	1,436	6%	555	30%	1.4
United States	1,106	8%	339	19%	4.4
Europe	982	11%	309	39%	2.5
Africa	531	58%	57	23%	0.5
India	487	32%	104	25%	0.4
Russia	369	1%	65	26%	3.0
Japan	201	3%	81	19%	2.2
Brazil	166	38%	45	78%	1.0
Indonesia	126	21%	22	14%	0.6
Canada	139	8%	45	83%	5.0
Iran	147	0%	22	6%	2.1
Mexico	95	7%	25	18%	1.0
South Korea	85	5%	46	5%	2.6
Australia	60	7%	18	21%	3.2
Argentina	42	7%	11	27%	1.2
Venezuela	20	3%	6	88%	0.9
World	7,050	14%	1,970	30%	1.2

The next table shows countries consuming most (85%) in Europe.

Countries consuming most (85%) in Europe as of 2018
Country	Fuel Mtoe	of which renewable	Electricity Mtoe	of which renewable
Germany	156	10%	45	46%
France	100	12%	38	21%
United Kingdom	95	5%	26	40%
Italy	87	9%	25	39%
Spain	60	10%	21	43%
Poland	58	12%	12	16%
Ukraine	38	5%	10	12%
Netherlands	36	4%	9	16%
Belgium	26	8%	7	23%
Sweden	20	35%	11	72%
Austria	20	19%	5	86%
Romania	19	20%	4	57%
Finland	18	34%	7	39%
Portugal	11	20%	4	67%
Denmark	11	15%	3	71%
Norway	8	16%	10	100%

=== Energy for energy ===
Some fuel and electricity is used to construct, maintain and demolish/recycle installations that produce fuel and electricity, such as oil platforms, uranium isotope separators and wind turbines. For these producers to be economical the ratio of energy returned on energy invested (EROEI) or energy return on investment (EROI) should be large enough.

If the final energy delivered for consumption is E and the EROI equals R, then the net energy available is E-E/R. The percentage available energy is 100-100/R. For R>10 more than 90% is available but for R=2 only 50% and for R=1 none. This steep decline is known as the net energy cliff.

== Availability of data ==
Many countries publish statistics on the energy supply and consumption of either their own country, of other countries of interest, or of all countries combined in one chart. One of the largest organizations in this field, the International Energy Agency (IEA), sells yearly comprehensive energy data which makes this data paywalled and difficult to access for internet users. The organization Enerdata on the other hand publishes a free Yearbook, making the data more accessible. Another trustworthy organization that provides accurate energy data, mainly referring to the USA, is the U.S. Energy Information Administration.

== Trends and outlook ==
Due to the COVID-19 pandemic, there was a significant decline in energy usage worldwide in 2020, but total energy demand worldwide had recovered by 2021, and has hit a record high in 2022.

In 2022, consumers worldwide spent nearly USD 10 trillion on energy, averaging more than USD 1,200 per person. This reflects a 20% increase over the previous five-year average, highlighting the significant economic impact and the increasing financial burden of energy consumption on a global scale.

=== IEA scenarios ===
In World Energy Outlook 2023 the IEA notes that "We are on track to see all fossil fuels peak before 2030". The IEA presents three scenarios:

1. The Stated Policies Scenario (STEPS) provides an outlook based on the latest policy settings. The share of fossil fuel in global energy supply – stuck for decades around 80% – starts to edge downwards and reaches 73% by 2030. This undercuts the rationale for any increase in fossil fuel investment. Renewables are set to contribute 80% of new power capacity to 2030, with solar PV alone accounting for more than half. The STEPS sees a peak in energy-related CO_{2} emissions in the mid-2020s but emissions remain high enough to push up global average temperatures to around 2.4 °C in 2100. Total energy demand continues to increase through to 2050. Total energy investment remains at about US$3 trillion per year.
2. The Announced Pledges Scenario (APS) assumes all national energy and climate targets made by governments are met in full and on time. The APS is associated with a temperature rise of 1.7 °C in 2100 (with a 50% probability). Total energy investment rises to about US$4 trillion per year after 2030.
3. The Net Zero Emissions by 2050 (NZE) Scenario limits global warming to 1.5 °C. The share of fossil fuel reaches 62% in 2030. Methane emissions from fossil fuel supply cuts by 75% in 2030. Total energy investment rises to almost US$5 trillion per year after 2030. Clean energy investment needs to rise everywhere, but the steepest increases are needed in emerging market and developing economies other than China, requiring enhanced international support. The share of electricity in final consumption exceeds 50% by 2050 in NZE. The share of nuclear power in electricity generation remains broadly stable over time in all scenarios, about 9%.

The IEA's "Electricity 2024" report details a 2.2% growth in global electricity demand for 2023, forecasting an annual increase of 3.4% through 2026, with notable contributions from emerging economies like China and India, despite a slump in advanced economies due to economic and inflationary pressures. The report underscores the significant impact of data centers, artificial intelligence and cryptocurrency, projecting a potential doubling of electricity consumption to 1,000 TWh by 2026, which is on par with Japan's current usage. Notably, 85% of the additional demand is expected to originate from China and India, with India's demand alone predicted to grow over 6% annually until 2026, driven by economic expansion and increasing air conditioning use.

Southeast Asia's electricity demand is also forecasted to climb by 5% annually through 2026. In the United States, a decrease was seen in 2023, but a moderate rise is anticipated in the coming years, largely fueled by data centers. The report also anticipates that a surge in electricity generation from low-emissions sources will meet the global demand growth over the next three years, with renewable energy sources predicted to surpass coal by early 2025.

=== Alternative scenarios ===
The goal set in the Paris Agreement to limit climate change will be difficult to achieve. Various scenarios for achieving the Paris Climate Agreement Goals have been developed, using IEA data but proposing transition to nearly 100% renewables by mid-century, along with steps such as reforestation. Nuclear power and carbon capture are excluded in these scenarios. The researchers say the costs will be far less than the $5 trillion per year governments currently spend subsidizing the fossil fuel industries responsible for climate change.

In the +2.0 C (global warming) Scenario total primary energy demand in 2040 can be 450 EJ = 10,755 Mtoe, or 400 EJ = 9560 Mtoe in the +1.5 Scenario, well below the current production. Renewable sources can increase their share to 300 EJ in the +2.0 C Scenario or 330 EJ in the +1.5 Scenario in 2040. In 2050 renewables can cover nearly all energy demand. Non-energy consumption will still include fossil fuels.

Global electricity generation from renewable energy sources will reach 88% by 2040 and 100% by 2050 in the alternative scenarios. "New" renewables—mainly wind, solar and geothermal energy—will contribute 83% of the total electricity generated. The average annual investment required between 2015 and 2050, including costs for additional power plants to produce hydrogen and synthetic fuels and for plant replacement, will be around $1.4 trillion.

Shifts from domestic aviation to rail and from road to rail are needed. Passenger car use must decrease in the OECD countries (but increase in developing world regions) after 2020. The passenger car use decline will be partly compensated by strong increase in public transport rail and bus systems.

CO_{2} emission can reduce from 32 Gt in 2015 to 7 Gt (+2.0 Scenario) or 2.7 Gt (+1.5 Scenario) in 2040, and to zero in 2050.

== See also ==
- Electric energy consumption – Worldwide consumption of electricity
- Energy demand management – Modification of consumer demand for energy
- Energy intensity – Measure of an economy's energy inefficiency
- Energy policy – How a government or business deals with energy
- Sustainable energy – Energy that responsibly meets social, economic, and environmental needs
- World Energy Outlook – Publication of the International Energy Agency
- World energy resources – Estimated maximum capacity for energy production on Earth

Lists

- List of countries by energy intensity
- List of countries by electricity consumption
- List of countries by electricity production
- List of countries by energy consumption per capita
- List of countries by greenhouse gas emissions
- List of countries by energy consumption and production
