= Zoran Rant =

Yugoslav engineer and scientist (1904–1972)

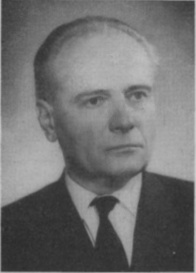
Zoran Rant (ca. 1964)

Zoran Rant (14 September 1904 – 12 February 1972) was a Yugoslav mechanical engineer, scientist and professor, associate member of SAZU. Rant invented the terms exergy and anergy.
