= Emergy =

Total energy consumed, directly and indirectly, to make a product or service

Emergy is the amount of energy consumed in direct and indirect transformations to make a product or service. Emergy is a measure of quality differences between different forms of energy. Emergy is an expression of all the energy used in the work processes that generate a product or service in units of one type of energy. Emergy is measured in units of emjoules, a unit referring to the available energy consumed in transformations. Emergy accounts for different forms of energy and resources (e.g. sunlight, water, fossil fuels, minerals, etc.) Each form is generated by transformation processes in nature and each has a different ability to support work in natural and in human systems. The recognition of these quality differences is a key concept.

== History ==
The theoretical and conceptual basis for the emergy methodology is grounded in thermodynamics, general system theory and systems ecology. Evolution of the theory by Howard T. Odum over the first thirty years is reviewed in Environmental Accounting and in the volume edited by C. A. S. Hall titled Maximum Power.

=== Background ===
Beginning in the 1950s, Odum analyzed energy flow in ecosystems (e.g. Silver Springs, Florida; Enewetak atoll in the south Pacific; Galveston Bay, Texas and Puerto Rican rainforests, amongst others) where energies in various forms at various scales were observed. His analysis of energy flow in ecosystems, and the differences in the potential energy of sunlight, fresh water currents, wind and ocean currents led him to make the suggestion that when two or more different energy sources drive a system, they cannot be added without first converting them to a common measure that accounts for their differences in energy quality. This led him to introduce the concept of "energy of one kind" as a common denominator with the name "energy cost". He then expanded the analysis to model food production in the 1960s, and in the 1970s to fossil fuels.

Odum's first formal statement of what would later be termed emergy was in 1973:

Energy is measured by calories, btu's, kilowatthours, and other intraconvertable units, but energy has a scale of quality which is not indicated by these measures. The ability to do work for man depends on the energy quality and quantity and this is measurable by the amount of energy of a lower quality grade required to develop the higher grade. The scale of energy goes from dilute sunlight up to plant matter, to coal, from coal to oil, to electricity

In 1975, he introduced a table of "Energy Quality Factors", kilocalories of sunlight energy required to make a kilocalorie of a higher quality energy, the first mention of the energy hierarchy principle which states that "energy quality is measured by the energy used in the transformations" from one type of energy to the next.

These energy quality factors, were placed on a fossil-fuel basis and called "Fossil Fuel Work Equivalents" (FFWE), and the quality of energies were measured based on a fossil fuel standard with rough equivalents of 1 kilocalorie of fossil fuel equal to 2000 kilocalories of sunlight. "Energy quality ratios" were computed by evaluating the quantity of energy in a transformation process to make a new form and were then used to convert different forms of energy to a common form, in this case fossil fuel equivalents. FFWE's were replaced with coal equivalents (CE) and by 1977, the system of evaluating quality was placed on a solar basis and termed solar equivalents (SE).

=== Embodied energy ===
The term "embodied energy" was used for a time in the early 1980s to refer to energy quality differences in terms of their costs of generation, and a ratio called a "quality factor" for the calories (or joules) of one kind of energy required to make those of another. However, since the term embodied energy was used by other groups who were evaluating the fossil fuel energy required to generate products and were not including all energies or using the concept to imply quality, embodied energy was dropped in favor of "embodied solar calories", and the quality factors became known as "transformation ratios".

=== Introduction of the term "emergy" ===
Use of the term "embodied energy" for this concept was modified in 1986 when David Scienceman, a visiting scholar at the University of Florida from Australia, suggested the term "emergy" and "emjoule" or "emcalorie" as the unit of measure to distinguish emergy units from units of available energy. The term transformation ratio was shortened to transformity in about the same time. Throughout these twenty years, the baseline or the basis for evaluating forms of energy and resources shifted from organic matter to fossil fuels and finally to solar energy.

After 1986, the emergy methodology continued to develop as the community of scientists expanded and as new applied research into combined systems of humans and nature presented new conceptual and theoretical questions. The maturing of the emergy methodology resulted in more rigorous definitions of terms and nomenclature and refinement of the methods of calculating transformities. The International Society for the Advancement of Emergy Research and a biennial International Conference at the University of Florida support this research.

=== Chronology ===
Table 1: Development of emergy, transformity and conversion ratios.
| Years | Baseline | Unit Emergy Values | Units | Reference |
|---|---|---|---|---|
| 1967–1971 | Organic matter the baseline. All energies of higher quality (wood, peat, coal, oil, living biomass, etc.) expressed in units of organic matter. | Sunlight equivalent to organic matter = 1000 solar kilocalories per kilocalorie of organic matter. | g dry wt O.M.; kcal, conversion from OM to kcal = 5kcal/g dry wt. | |
| 1973–1980 | Fossil fuels and then coal the baseline. Energy of lower quality (sunlight, plants, wood, etc.) were expressed in units of fossil fuels and later in units of coal equivalents. | Direct sunlight equivalents of fossil fuels = 2000 solar kilocalories per fossil fuel kilocalorie | Fossil fuel work equivalents (FFWE) and later, coal equivalents (CE) | |
| 1980–1982 | Global solar energy the baseline. All energies of higher quality (wind, rain, wave, organic matter, wood, fossil fuels, etc.) expressed in units of solar energy | 6800 global solar Calories per Calorie of available energy in coal | Global solar calories (GSE). | |
| 1983–1986 | Recognized that solar energy, deep heat, and tidal momentum were basis for global processes. Total annual global sources equal to the sum of these (9.44 E24 solar joules/yr) | Embodied solar joules per joule of fossil fuels = 40,000 seJ/J | Embodied solar equivalents (SEJ) and later called "emergy" with nomenclature (seJ) | |
| 1987–2000 | Further refinements of total energy driving global processes, Embodied solar energy renamed to EMERGY | Solar Emergy per Joule of coal energy ~ 40,000 solar emjoules/ Joule (seJ/J) named Transformity | seJ/J = Transformity; seJ/g = Specific emergy | |
| 2000–2016 | Emergy driving the biosphere reevaluated as 15.83 E24 seJ/yr raising all previously calculated transformities by the ratio of 15.83/9.44 = 1.68 | Solar emergy per Joule of coal energy ~ 6.7 E 4 seJ/J | seJ/J = Transformity; seJ/g = Specific emergy | |
| 2016-present | Emergy driving the biosphere reevaluated as 12.0 E24 seJ/yr, raising the previously calculated transformities based on 9.44 with 12.0/9.44 = 1.27, and diminishing the previously calculated transformities based on 15.83 by the ratio of 12.00/ 15.83 = 0.76 | | | |

== Definitions and examples ==
Emergy— amount of energy of one form that is used in transformations directly and indirectly to make a product or service. The unit of emergy is the emjoule or emergy joule. Using emergy, sunlight, fuel, electricity, and human service can be put on a common basis by expressing each of them in the emjoules of solar energy that is required to produce them. If solar emergy is the baseline, then the results are solar emjoules (abbreviated seJ). Although other baselines have been used, such as coal emjoules or electrical emjoules, in most cases emergy data are given in solar emjoules.

Unit Emergy Values (UEVs) — the emergy required to generate one unit of output. Types of UEVs:

Transformity — emergy input per unit of available energy output. For example, if 10,000 solar emjoules are required to generate a joule of wood, then the solar transformity of that wood is 10,000 solar emjoules per joule (abbreviated seJ/J). The solar transformity of the sunlight absorbed by the earth is 1.0 by definition.

Specific emergy — emergy per unit mass output. Specific emergy is usually expressed as solar emergy per gram (seJ/g). Because energy is required to concentrate materials, the unit emergy value of any substance increases with concentration. Elements and compounds not abundant in nature therefore have higher emergy/mass ratios when found in concentrated form since more environmental work is required to concentrate them, both spatially and chemically.

Emergy per unit money — the emergy supporting the generation of one unit of economic product (expressed in monetary terms). It is used to convert money into emergy units. Since money is paid for goods and services, but not to the environment, the contribution to a process represented by monetary payments is the emergy that money purchases. The amount of resources that money buys depends on the amount of emergy supporting the economy and the amount of money circulating. An average emergy/money ratio in solar emjoules/$ can be calculated by dividing the total emergy use of a state or nation by its gross economic product. It varies by country and has been shown to decrease each year, which is one index of inflation. This emergy/money ratio is useful for evaluating service inputs given in money units where an average wage rate is appropriate.

Emergy per unit labor — the emergy supporting one unit of direct labor applied to a process. Workers apply their efforts to a process and in so doing they indirectly invest in it the emergy that made their labor possible (food, training, transport, etc). This emergy intensity is generally expressed as emergy per time (seJ/yr; seJ/hr), but emergy per money earned (seJ/$) is also used. Indirect labor required to make and supply the inputs to a process is generally measured with the dollar cost of services, so that its emergy intensity is calculated as seJ/$.

Empower — a flow of emergy (i.e., emergy per unit time).

Table 2. Nomenclature
| Term | Definition | Abbreviation | Units |
|---|---|---|---|
Extensive Properties
| Emergy | The amount of available energy of one type (usually solar) that is directly or indirectly required to generate a given output flow or storage of energy or matter. | E_{m} | seJ (solar equivalent Joules) |
| Emergy Flow | Any flow of emergy associated with inflowing energy or materials to a system/process. | R=renewable flows; N= nonrenewable flows; F= imported flows; S= services | seJ*time^{−1} |
| Gross Emergy Product | Total emergy annually used to drive a national or regional economy | GEP | seJ*yr^{−1} |
Product-related Intensive Properties
| Transformity | Emergy investment per unit process output of available energy | Τ_{r} | seJ*J^{−1} |
| Specific Emergy | Emergy investment per unit process output of dry mass | S_{p}E_{m} | seJ*g^{−1} |
| Emergy Intensity of currency | Emergy investment per unit of GDP generated in a country, region or process | EIC | seJ*currency^{−1} |
Space-related Intensive Properties
| Emergy Density | Emergy stored in a volume unit of a given material | E_{m}D | seJ*volume^{−3} |
Time-related Intensive Properties
| Empower | Emergy flow (released, used) per unit time | E_{m}P | seJ*time^{−1} |
| Empower Intensity | Areal Empower (emergy released per unit time and area) | E_{m}PI | seJ*time^{−1}*area^{−1} |
| Empower Density | Emergy released per unit time by a unit volume (e.g. a power plant or engine) | E_{m}Pd | seJ*time^{−1}*volume^{−3} |
Selected Performance Indicators
| Emergy released (used) | Total emergy investment in a process (measure of a process footprint) | U= N+R+F+S (see Fig.1) | seJ |
| Emergy Yield Ratio | Total emergy released (used up) per unit of emergy invested | EYR= U/(F+S) (see Fig.1) | — |
| Environmental Loading Ratio | Total nonrenewable and imported emergy released per unit of local renewable resource | ELR= (N+F+S)/R (see Fig.1) | — |
| Emergy Sustainability Index | Emergy yield per unit of environmental loading | ESI= EYR/ELR (see Fig.1) | — |
| Renewability | Percentage of total emergy released (used) that is renewable. | %REN= R/U (see Fig.1) | — |
| Emergy Investment Ratio | Emergy investment needed to exploit one unit of local (renewable and nonrenewable) resource. | EIR= (F+S)/(R+N) (see Fig.1) | — |

== Accounting method ==
Emergy accounting converts the thermodynamic basis of all forms of energy, resources and human services into equivalents of a single form of energy, usually solar. To evaluate a system, a system diagram organizes the evaluation and account for energy inputs and outflows. A table of the flows of resources, labor and energy is constructed from the diagram and all flows are evaluated. The final step involves interpreting the results.

=== Purpose ===
In some cases, an evaluation is done to determine the fit of a development proposal within its environment. It also allows comparison of alternatives. Another purpose is to seek the best use of resources to maximize economic vitality.

=== Systems diagram ===
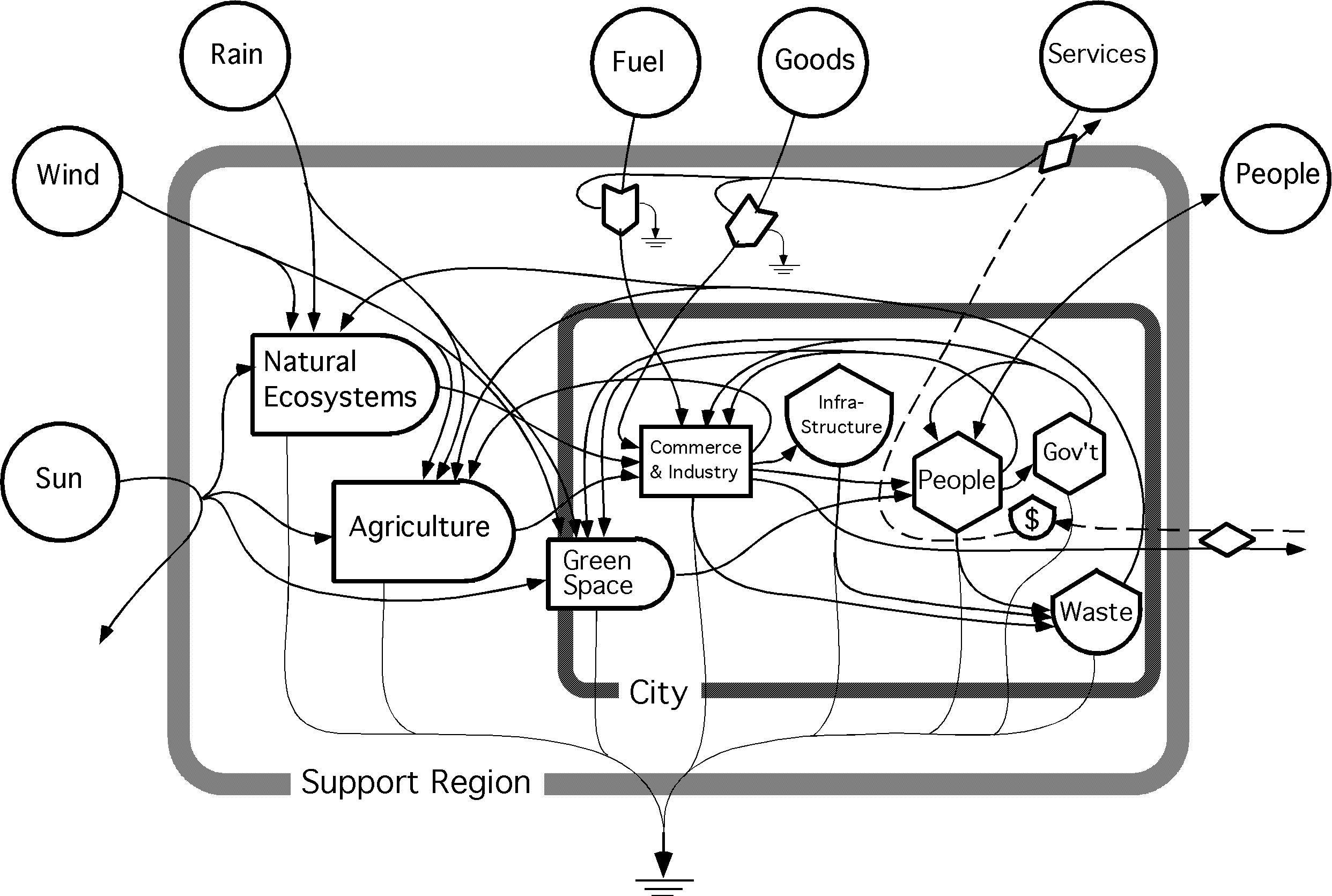
Figure 1: Energy system diagram of a city in its support region

System diagrams show the inputs that are evaluated and summed to obtain the emergy of a flow. A diagram of a city and its regional support area is shown in Figure 1.

=== Evaluation table ===
A table (see example below) of resource flows, labor and energy is constructed from the diagram. Raw data on inflows that cross the boundary are converted into emergy units, and then summed to obtain total emergy supporting the system. Energy flows per unit time (usually per year) are presented in the table as separate line items.

Table 3. Example emergy evaluation table
| Note | Item(name) | Data(flow/time) | Units | UEV (seJ/unit) | Solar Emergy (seJ/time) |
|---|---|---|---|---|---|
| 1. | First item | xxx.x | J/yr | xxx.x | Em_{1} |
| 2. | Second item | xxx.x | g/yr | xxx.x | Em_{2} |
| -- | | | | | |
| n. | nth item | xxx.x | J/yr | xxx.x | Em_{n} |
| O. | Output | xxx.x | J/yr or g/yr | xxx.x | $\sum_{n}^1Em_i$ |

Legend

- Column #1 is the line item number, which is also the number of the footnote found below the table where raw data sources are cited and calculations are shown.
- Column # 2 is the name of the item, which is also shown on the aggregated diagram.
- Column # 3 is the raw data in joules, grams, dollars or other units.
- Column # 4 shows the units for each raw data item.
- Column # 5 is the unit emergy value, expressed in solar emergy joules per unit. Sometimes, inputs are expressed in grams, hours, or dollars, therefore an appropriate UEV is used (sej/hr; sej/g; sej/$).
- Column # 6 is the solar emergy of a given flow, calculated as the raw input times the UEV (Column 3 times Column 5).

All tables are followed by footnotes that show citations for data and calculations.

=== Calculating unit values ===
The table allows a unit emergy value to be calculated. The final, output row (row “O” in the example table above) is evaluated first in units of energy or mass. Then the input emergy is summed and the unit emergy value is calculated by dividing the emergy by the units of the output.

=== Performance indicators ===
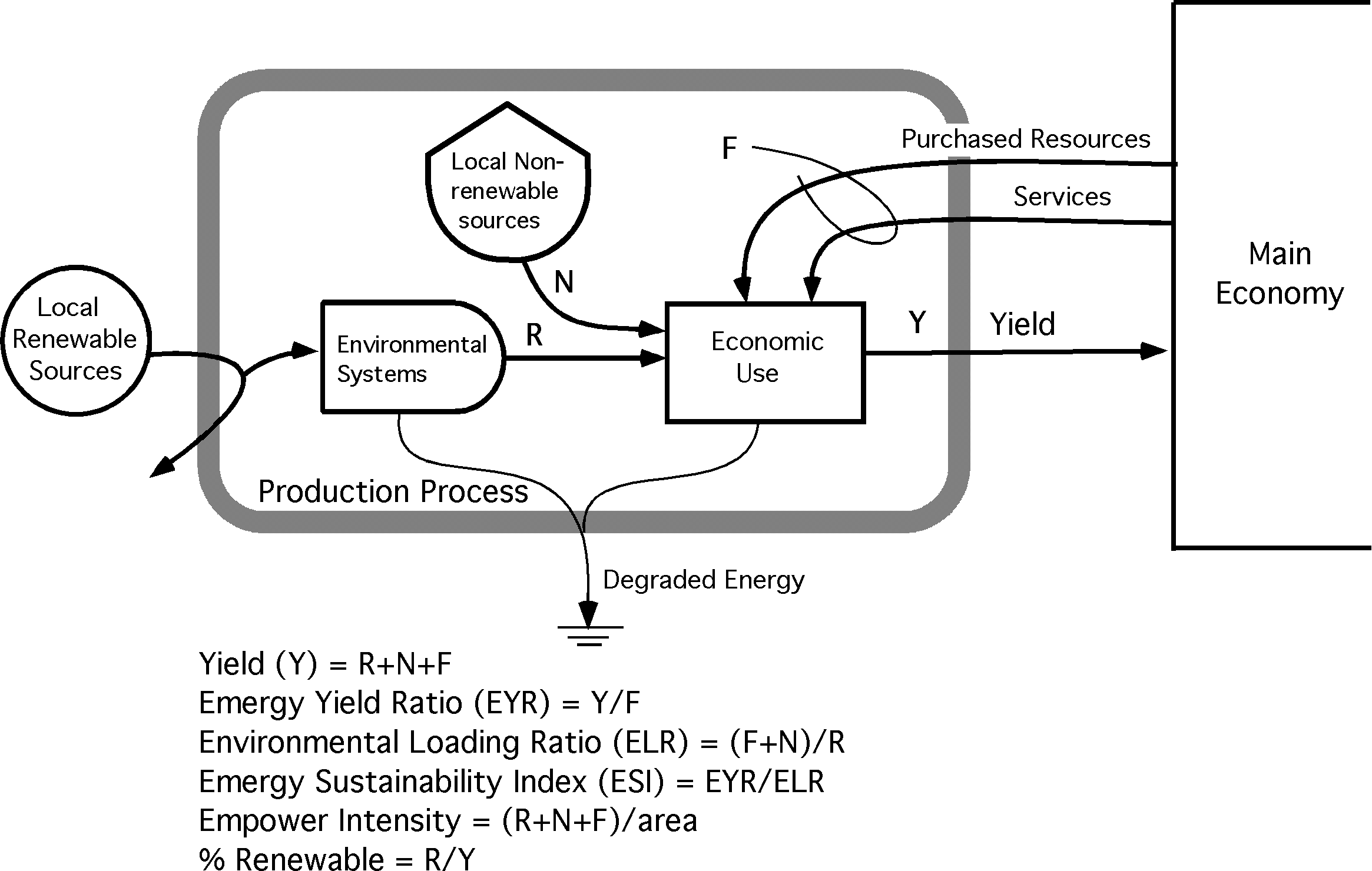
Figure 2: Systems diagram showing flows used in the performance indicator ratios.

Figure 2 shows non-renewable environmental contributions (N) as an emergy storage of materials, renewable environmental inputs (R), and inputs from the economy as purchased (F) goods and services. Purchased inputs are needed for the process to take place and include human service and purchased non-renewable energy and material brought in from elsewhere (fuels, minerals, electricity, machinery, fertilizer, etc.). Several ratios, or indices are given in Figure 2 that assess the global performance of a process.

- Emergy Yield Ratio (EYR) — Emergy released (used up) per unit invested. The ratio is a measure of how much an investment enables a process to exploit local resources.
- Environmental Loading Ratio (ELR) — The ratio of nonrenewable and imported emergy use to renewable emergy use. It is an indicator of the pressure a transformation process exerts on the environment and can be considered a measure of ecosystem stress due to a production (transformation activity).
- Emergy Sustainability Index (ESI) — The ratio of EYR to ELR. It measures the contribution of a resource or process to the economy per unit of environmental loading.
- Areal Empower Intensity — The ratio of emergy use in the economy of a region to its area. Renewable and nonrenewable emergy density are calculated separately by dividing the total renewable emergy by area and the total nonrenewable emergy by area, respectively.

Other ratios are useful depending on the type and scale of the system under evaluation.

- Percent Renewable Emergy (%Ren) — The ratio of renewable emergy to total emergy use. In the long run, only processes with high %Ren are sustainable.
- Emprice. The emprice of a commodity is the emergy one receives for the money spent in sej/$.
- Emergy Exchange Ratio (EER) — The ratio of emergy exchanged in a trade or purchase (what is received to what is given). The ratio is always expressed relative to a trading partner and is a measure of the relative trade advantage of one partner over the other.
- Emergy per capita — The ratio of emergy use of a region or nation to the population. Emergy per capita can be used as a measure of potential, average standard of living of the population.
- Emergy-based energy return on investment was introduced as a way to bridge and improve the concept of Energy returned on energy invested to also include environmental impacts.

== Uses ==
The recognition of the relevance of energy to the growth and dynamics of complex systems has resulted in increased emphasis on environmental evaluation methods that can account for and interpret the effects of matter and energy flows at all scales in systems of humanity and nature. The following table lists some general areas in which the emergy methodology has been employed.

Table 4. Fields of Study
Emergy and ecosystems

Self-organization (Odum, 1986; Odum, 1988)
Aquatic and marine ecosystems (Odum et al., 1978a; Odum and Arding, 1991; Brandt-Williams, 1999)
Food webs and hierarchies (Odum et al. 1999; Brown and Bardi, 2001)
Ecosystem health (Brown and Ulgiati, 2004)
Forest ecosystems (Doherty et al., 1995; Lu et al. 2006)
Complexity (Odum, 1987a; Odum, 1994; Brown and Cohen, 2008)
Biodiversity (Brown et al. 2006)

Emergy and Information

Diversity and information (Keitt, 1991; Odum, 1996, Jorgensen et al., 2004)
Culture, Education, University (Odum and Odum, 1980; Odum et al., 1995; Odum et al., 1978b)

Emergy and Agriculture

Food production, agriculture (Odum, 1984; Ulgiati et al. 1993; Martin et al. 2006; Cuadra and Rydberg, 2006; de Barros et al. 2009; Cavalett and Ortega, 2009)
Livestock production (Rótolo et al.2007)
Agriculture and society (Rydberg and Haden, 2006; Cuadra and Björklund, 2007; Lu, and Campbell, 2009)
Soil erosion (Lefroy and Rydberg, 2003; Cohen et al. 2006)

Emergy and energy sources and carriers

Fossil fuels (Odum et a.l 1976; Brown et al., 1993; Odum, 1996; Bargigli et al., 2004; Bastianoni et al. 2005; Bastianoni et al. 2009)
Renewable and nonrenewable electricity (Odum et al. 1983; Brown and Ulgiati, 2001; Ulgiati and Brown, 2001; Peng et al. 2008)
Hydroelectric dams (Brown and McClanahan, 1992)
Biofuels (Odum, 1980a; Odum and Odum, 1984; Carraretto et al., 2004; Dong et al. 2008; Felix and Tilley, 2009; Franzese et al., 2009)
Hydrogen (Barbir, 1992)

Emergy and the Economy

National and international analyses (Odum, 1987b; Brown, 2003; Cialani et al. 2003; Ferreyra and Brown. 2007; Lomas et al., 2008; Jiang et al., 2008)
National Environmental Accounting Database https://www.emergy-nead.com/ and https://nead.um01.cn/home (Liu et al., 2017)
Trade (Odum, 1984a; Brown, 2003)
Environmental accounting (Odum, 1996)
Development policies (Odum, 1980b)
Sustainability (Odum, 1973; Odum, 1976a; Brown and Ulgiati, 1999; Odum and Odum, 2002; Brown et al. 2009)
Tourism (Lei and Wang, 2008a; Lei et al., 2011; Vassallo et al., 2009)
Gambling industry (Lei et al., 2011)

Emergy and cities

Spatial organization and urban development (Odum et al., 1995b; Huang, 1998; Huang and Chen, 2005; Lei et al., 2008; Ascione, et al. 2009)
Urban metabolism (Huang et al., 2006; Zhang et al., 2009)
Transportation modes (Federici, et al. 2003; Federici et al., 2008; Federici et al., 2009; Almeida et al., 2010 )

Emergy and landscapes

Spatial empower, Land development indicators (Brown and Vivas, 2004; Reiss and Brown, 2007)
Emergy in landforms (Kangas, 2002)
Watersheds (Agostinho et al., 2010)

Emergy and ecological engineering

Restoration models (Prado-Jartar and Brown, 1996)
Reclamation projects (Brown, 2005; Lei and Wang, 2008b; Lu et al., 2009 )
Artificial Ecosystems: wetlands, pond (Odum, 1985)
Waste treatment (Kent et al. 2000; Grönlund, et al. 2004; Giberna et al. 2004; Lei and Wang, 2008c)

Emergy, material flows and recycling

Mining and minerals processing (Odum, 1996; Pulselli et al.2008)
Industrial production, ecodesign (Zhang et al. 2009; Almeida et al., 2009)
Recycling pattern in human-dominated ecosystems (Brown and Buranakarn, 2003)
Emergy-based energy return on investment method for evaluating energy exploitation(Chen et al, 2003)

Emergy and thermodynamics

Efficiency and Power (Odum and Pinkerton, 1955; Odum, 1995)
Maximum Empower Principle (Odum, 1975; Odum, 1983; Cai e al., 2004)
Pulsing paradigm (Odum, 1982; Odum, W.P. et al., 1995)
Thermodynamic principles (Giannantoni, 2002, 2003)

Emergy and systems modeling

Energy systems language and modeling (Odum, 1971; Odum, 1972)
National sustainability (Brown et al. 2009; Lei and Zhou, 2012)
Sensitivity analysis, uncertainty (Laganis and Debeljak, 2006; Ingwersen, 2010)

Emergy and policy

Tools for decision makers (Giannetti et al., 2006; Almeida, et al. 2007; Giannetti et al., 2010)
Conservation and economic value (Lu et al.2007)

References for each of the citations in this table are given in a separate list at the end of this article

== Controversies ==
The concept of emergy has been controversial within academe including ecology, thermodynamics and economy. Emergy theory has been criticized for allegedly offering an energy theory of value to replace other theories of value. The stated goal of emergy evaluations is to provide an "ecocentric" valuation of systems, processes. Thus it does not purport to replace economic values but to provide additional information, from a different point of view.

The idea that a calorie of sunlight is not equivalent to a calorie of fossil fuel or electricity strikes many as absurd, based on the 1st Law definition of energy units as measures of heat (i.e. Joule's mechanical equivalent of heat). Others have rejected the concept as impractical since from their perspective it is impossible to objectively quantify the amount of sunlight that is required to produce a quantity of oil. In combining systems of humanity and nature and evaluating environmental input to economies, mainstream economists criticize the emergy methodology for disregarding market values.

== See also ==
- Anthropogenic metabolism
- Ecological economics
- Ecological energetics
- Energy accounting
- Environmental accounting
- Exergy
- Industrial metabolism
- Material flow analysis
- Maximum power principle
- Social metabolism
- Systems ecology
- Urban metabolism

== Notes ==
References for Table 4

Agostinho, F., L.A. Ambrósio, E. Ortega. 2010. Assessment of a large watershed in Brazil using Emergy Evaluation and Geographical Information System. Ecological Modelling, Volume 221, Issue 8, 24 April 2010, Pages 1209-1220
Almeida, C.M.V.B., A.J.M. Rodrigues, S.H. Bonilla, B.F. Giannetti. 2010. Emergy as a tool for Ecodesign: evaluating materials selection for beverage packages in Brazil. Journal of Cleaner Production, Volume 18, Issue 1, January 2010, Pages 32-43
Almeida, C.M.V.B., D. Borges Jr., S.H. Bonilla, B.F. Giannetti 2010. Identifying improvements in water management of bus-washing stations in Brazil Resources, Conservation and Recycling, In Press, Corrected Proof, Available online 13 February 2010
Almeida, C.M.V.B., F.A. Barrella, B.F. Giannetti. 2007. Emergetic ternary diagrams: five examples for application in environmental accounting for decision-making. Journal of Cleaner Production, Volume 15, Issue 1, 2007, Pages 63-74
Ascione, M., L. Campanella, F. Cherubini, and S. Ulgiati. 2009. Environmental driving forces of urban growth and development: An emergy-based assessment of the city of Rome, Italy. Landscape and Urban Planning, Volume 93, Issues 3-4, 15 December 2009, Pages 238-249
Barbir, F., 1992. Analysis and Modeling of Environmental and Economic Impacts of the Solar Hydrogen Energy System. Ph.D. Dissertation, Dept. of Mechanical Engineering, University of Miami, Florida, 176 pp.
Bargigli, S., M. Raugei, S. Ulgiati. 2004. Comparison of thermodynamic and environmental indexes of natural gas, syngas and hydrogen production processes. Energy, Volume 29, Issues 12-15, October–December 2004, Pages 2145-2159
Bastianoni, S., D. Campbell, L.Susani, E. Tiezzi. 2005. The solar transformity of oil and petroleum natural gas. Ecological Modelling, Volume 186, Issue 2, 15 August 2005, Pages 212-220
Bastianoni, S., D.E. Campbell, R. Ridolfi, F.M. Pulselli. 2009. The solar transformity of petroleum fuels. Ecological Modelling, Volume 220, Issue 1, 10 January 2009, Pages 40-50
Brandt-Williams, S. 1999. Evaluation of watershed control of two Central Florida lakes : Newnans Lake and Lake Weir. PhD Dissertation, Department of Environmental Engineering Sciences, University of Florida, Gainesville. 287p.
Brown M.T. and Vivas M.B., 2004. A Landscape Development Intensity Index. Env. Monitoring and Assessment, in press.
Brown M.T., and Buranakarn V., 2003. Emergy indices and ratios for sustainable material cycles and recycle options. Resources, Conservation and Recycling 38: 1-22.
Brown, M.T., M.J. Cohen, and S. Sweeney. 2009. Predicting National Sustainability: the convergence of energetic, economic and environmental realities. Ecological Modelling 220: 3424-3438
Brown, M.T. 2005. Landscape restoration following phosphate mining: 30 years of co-evolution of science, industry and regulation. Ecological Engineering 24: 309-329
Brown, M.T. and Bardi, E., 2001. Emergy of Ecosystems. Folio No. 3 of Handbook of Emergy Evaluation The Center for Environmental Policy, University of Florida, Gainesville 93 p. (http://www.emergysystems.org/downloads/Folios/Folio_3.pdf).
Brown, M.T. and T. McClanahan 1996. Emergy Analysis Perspectives for Thailand and Mekong River Dam Proposals. Ecological Modelling 91:pp105-130
Brown, M.T., 2003. Resource Imperialism. Emergy Perspectives on Sustainability, International Trade and Balancing the Welfare of Nations. In: Book of Proceedings of the International Workshop “Advances in Energy Studies. Reconsidering the Importance of Energy”. Porto Venere, Italy, 24–28 September 2002. S. Ulgiati, M.T. Brown, M. Giampietro, R.A. Herendeen, and K. Mayumi, Editors. SGE Publisher Padova, Italy, pp. 135-149.
Brown, M.T., and Ulgiati, S., 1999. Emergy Evaluation of the Biosphere and Natural Capital. Ambio, 28(6): 486-493.
Brown, M.T., and Ulgiati, S., 2002. The Role of Environmental Services in Electricity Production Processes. Journal of Cleaner Production, 10: 321-334.
Brown, M.T., and Ulgiati, S., 2004. Emergy, Transformity, and Ecosystem Health. In: Handbook of Ecosystem Health. Sven E. Jorgensen Editor. CRC Press, New York.
Brown, M.T., M.J. Cohen Emergy and Network Analysis. 2008. Encyclopedia of Ecology, 2008, Pages 1229-1239
Brown, M.T., M.J. Cohen, S. Sweeney. 2009. Predicting national sustainability: The convergence of energetic, economic and environmental realities. Ecological Modelling, Volume 220, Issue 23, 10 December 2009, Pages 3424-3438
Brown, M.T., Woithe, R.D., Montague, C.L., Odum, H.T., and Odum, E.C., 1993. Emergy Analysis Perspectives of the Exxon Valdez Oil Spill in Prince William Sound, Alaska. Final Report to the Cousteau Society. Center for Wetlands, University of Florida, Gainesville, FL, 114 pp.
Cai, T. T., T. W Olsen, D. E Campbell. 2004. Maximum (em)power: a foundational principle linking man and nature. Ecological Modelling, Volume 178, Issues 1-2, 15 October 2004, Pages 115-119
Carraretto, C., A. Macor, A. Mirandola, A. Stoppato, S. Tonon. 2004. Biodiesel as alternative fuel: Experimental analysis and energetic evaluations. Energy, Volume 29, Issues 12-15, October–December 2004, Pages 2195-2211
Cavalett, O., E. Ortega . 2009. Emergy, nutrients balance, and economic assessment of soybean production and industrialization in Brazil. Journal of Cleaner Production, Volume 17, Issue 8, May 2009, Pages 762-771
Chen, Y., Feng, L., Wang, J., Höök, M., 2017. Emergy-based energy return on investment method for evaluating energy exploitation. Energy, Volume 128, 1 June 2017, Pages 540-549
Cialani, C., Russi, D., and Ulgiati, S., 2004. Investigating a 20-year national economic dynamics by means of emergy-based indicators. In: Brown, M.T., Campbell, D., Comar, V., Huang, S.L., Rydberg, T., Tilley, D.R., and Ulgiati, S., (Editors), 2004. Emergy Synthesis. Theory and Applications of the Emergy Methodology – 3. Book of Proceedings of the Third International Emergy Research Conference, Gainesville, FL, 29–31 January 2004. The Center for Environmental Policy, University of Florida, Gainesville, FL.
Cohen, M.J. M.T. Brown, K.D. Shepherd. 2006. Estimating the environmental costs of soil erosion at multiple scales in Kenya using emergy synthesis. Agriculture, Ecosystems & Environment, Volume 114, Issues 2-4, June 2006, Pages 249-269
Cuadra, M., J. Björklund. 2007. Assessment of economic and ecological carrying capacity of agricultural crops in Nicaragua. Ecological Indicators, Volume 7, Issue 1, January 2007, Pages 133-149
Cuadra, M., T. Rydberg. 2006. Emergy evaluation on the production, processing and export of coffee in Nicaragua. Ecological Modelling, Volume 196, Issues 3-4, 25 July 2006, Pages 421-433
de Barros, I., J.M. Blazy, G. Stachetti Rodrigues, R. Tournebize, J.P. Cinna. 2009. Emergy evaluation and economic performance of banana cropping systems in Guadeloupe (French West Indies). Agriculture, Ecosystems & Environment, Volume 129, Issue 4, February 2009, Pages 437-449
Doherty, S.J., Odum, H.T., and Nilsson, P.O., 1995. Systems Analysis of the Solar Emergy Basis for Forest Alternatives in Sweden. Final Report to the Swedish State Power Board, College of Forestry, Garpenberg, Sweden, 112 pp.
Dong, X., S. Ulgiati, M. Yan, X. Zhang, W.Gao. 2008. Energy and eMergy evaluation of bioethanol production from wheat in Henan Province, China. Energy Policy, Volume 36, Issue 10, October 2008, Pages 3882-3892
Federici, M., S. Ulgiati, D. Verdesca, R. Basosi. 2003. Efficiency and sustainability indicators for passenger and commodities transportation systems: The case of Siena, Italy. Ecological Indicators, Volume 3, Issue 3, August 2003, Pages 155-169
Federici, M., S. Ulgiati, R. Basosi. 2008. A thermodynamic, environmental and material flow analysis of the Italian highway and railway transport systems. Energy, Volume 33, Issue 5, May 2008, Pages 760-775
Federici, M., S. Ulgiati, R. Basosi. 2009. Air versus terrestrial transport modalities: An energy and environmental comparison. Energy, Volume 34, Issue 10, October 2009, Pages 1493-1503
Felix, E. D.R. Tilley. 2009. Integrated energy, environmental and financial analysis of ethanol production from cellulosic switchgrass. Energy, Volume 34, Issue 4, April 2009, Pages 410-436
Franzese, P.P., T. Rydberg, G.F. Russo, S. Ulgiati. 2009. Sustainable biomass production: A comparison between Gross Energy Requirement and Emergy Synthesis methods Ecological Indicators, Volume 9, Issue 5, September 2009, Pages 959-970
Giannantoni C., 2002. The Maximum Em-Power Principle as the Basis for Thermodynamics of Quality. SGE Publisher, Padova, Italy, pp. 185. ISBN 88-86281-76-5.
Giannantoni, C., 2003. The Problem of the Initial Conditions and Their Physical Meaning in Linear Differential Equations of Fractional Order. Applied Mathematics and Computation 141, 87–102.
Giannetti, B.F., C.M.V.B. Almeida, S.H. Bonilla. 2010. Comparing emergy accounting with well-known sustainability metrics: The case of Southern Cone Common Market, Mercosur. Energy Policy, Volume 38, Issue 7, July 2010, Pages 3518-3526
Giannetti, B.F., F.A. Barrella, C.M.V.B. Almeida. 2006. A combined tool for environmental scientists and decision makers: ternary diagrams and emergy accounting. Journal of Cleaner Production, Volume 14, Issue 2, 2006, Pages 201-210
Grönlund, E., A. Klang, S. Falk, J. Hanæus. 2004. Sustainability of wastewater treatment with microalgae in cold climate, evaluated with emergy and socio-ecological principles. Ecological Engineering, Volume 22, Issue 3, 1 May 2004, Pages 155-174
Huang, S-L., C-W. Chen. 2005. Theory of urban energetics and mechanisms of urban development. Ecological Modelling, Volume 189, Issues 1-2, 25 November 2005, Pages 49-71
Huang, S-L., C-L. Lee, C-W. Chen. 2006. Socioeconomic metabolism in Taiwan: Emergy synthesis versus material flow analysis. Resources, Conservation and Recycling, Volume 48, Issue 2, 15 August 2006, Pages 166-196
Huang, S.L., 1998. Spatial Hierarchy of Urban Energetic Systems. In: Book of Proceedings of the International Workshop “Advances in Energy Studies. Energy Flows in Ecology and Economy”. Porto Venere, Italy, 26–30 May 1998. S. Ulgiati, M.T. Brown, M. Giampietro, R.A. Herendeen, and K. Mayumi (Eds), MUSIS Publisher, Roma, Italy, pp. 499-514.
Ingwersen, W.W. 2010. Uncertainty characterization for emergy values. Ecological Modelling, Volume 221, Issue 3, 10 February 2010, Pages 445-452
Jiang, M.M., J.B. Zhou, B. Chen, G.Q. Chen. 2008. Emergy-based ecological account for the Chinese economy in 2004. Communications in Nonlinear Science and Numerical Simulation, Volume 13, Issue 10, December 2008, Pages 2337-2356
Jorgensen, S. E., H. T. Odum, M. T. Brown. 2004. Emergy and exergy stored in genetic information. Ecological Modelling, Volume 178, Issues 1-2, 15 October 2004, Pages 11-16
Kangas, P.C., 2002. Emergy of Landforms. Folio No. 5 of Handbook of Emergy Evaluation. The Center for Environmental Policy, University of Florida, Gainesville 93 p. (http://www.emergysystems.org/downloads/Folios/Folio_5.pdf)
Keitt, T.H., 1991. Hierarchical Organization of energy and information in a tropical rain forest ecosystem. M.S. Thesis, Environmental Engineering Sciences, University of Florida, Gainesville, 72 pp.
Kent, R., H.T. Odum and F.N. Scatena. 2000. Eutrophic overgrowth in the self organization of tropical wetlands illustrated with a study of swine wastes in rainforest plots. Ecol. Engr. 16(2000):255-269.
Laganis, J., M. Debeljak. 2006. Sensitivity analysis of the emergy flows at the solar salt production process in Slovenia. Ecological Modelling, Volume 194, Issues 1-3, 25 March 2006, Pages 287-295
Lefroy, E., T. Rydberg. 2003. Emergy evaluation of three cropping systems in southwestern Australia. Ecological Modelling, Volume 161, Issue 3, 15 March 2003, Pages 193-209
Lei, K., Z. Wang. 2008a. Emergy synthesis of tourism-based urban ecosystem. Journal of Environmental Management, Volume 88, Issue 4, September 2008, Pages 831-844
Lei K., Z. Wang. 2008b. Emergy Synthesis and Simulation of Macao. Energy, Volume 33, Issue 4, pages 613-625
Lei K., Z. Wang. 2008c. Municipal Wastes and Their Solar Transformities: Emergy Synthesis for Macao. Waste management, Volume 28, Issue 12, pages 2522-2531
Lei K., Z. Wang, S.Tong. 2008. Holistic Emergy Analysis of Macao. Ecological Engineering, Volume 32, Issue 1, pages 30-43
Lei K., S. Zhou, D. Hu, Z. Wang. 2010. Ecological energy accounting for the gambling sector: A case study in Macao. Ecological complexity, Volume 7, pages 149-155
Lei K., S. Zhou, D. Hu, Z. Guo, A. Cao. 2011. Emergy analysis for tourism systems: Principles and a case study for Macao. Ecological complexity, Volume 8, 192-200
Lei K., S. Zhou. 2012. Per capita Resource Consumption and Resource Carrying Capacity: a Comparison of the Sustainability of 17 Mainstream Countries. Energy Policy, Volume 42, pages 603-612
Liu G.Y. et al., 2017. https://www.emergy-nead.com and http://nead.um01.cn/home Archived 2018-12-15 at the Wayback Machine.
Lomas, P.L., S. Álvarez, M. Rodríguez, C. Montes. 2008. Environmental accounting as a management tool in the Mediterranean context: The Spanish economy during the last 20 years. Journal of Environmental Management, Volume 88, Issue 2, July 2008, Pages 326-347
Lu, H-F., W-L.Kang, D.E. Campbell, H. Ren, Y-W. Tan, R-X. Feng, J-T. Luo, F-P. Chen. 2009. Emergy and economic evaluations of four fruit production systems on reclaimed wetlands surrounding the Pearl River Estuary, China. Ecological Engineering, Volume 35, Issue 12, December 2009, Pages 1743-1757
Lu, H. D.E. Campbell, Z. Li, H. Ren. 2006.Emergy synthesis of an agro-forest restoration system in lower subtropical China. Ecological Engineering, Volume 27, Issue 3, 2 October 2006, Pages 175-192
Lu, H., D. Campbell, J. Chen, P. Qin, H. Ren . 2007. Conservation and economic viability of nature reserves: An emergy evaluation of the Yancheng Biosphere Reserve. Biological Conservation, Volume 139, Issues 3-4, October 2007, Pages 415-438
Lu, H., D. E. Campbell. 2009. Ecological and economic dynamics of the Shunde agricultural system under China's small city development strategy. Journal of Environmental Management, Volume 90, Issue 8, June 2009, Pages 2589-2600
Martin, J.F., S.A.W. Diemont, E. Powell, M. Stanton, S. Levy-Tacher. 2006. Emergy evaluation of the performance and sustainability of three agricultural systems with different scales and management. Agriculture, Ecosystems & Environment, Volume 115, Issues 1-4, July 2006, Pages 128-140
Odum H.T. and E.C. Odum, 2001. A Prosperous Way Down: Principles and Policies. University Press of Colorado.
Odum H.T. and Pinkerton R.C., 1955. Time's speed regulator: the optimum efficiency for maximum power output in physical and biological systems. American Scientist, 43: 331-343.
Odum H.T., 1983. Maximum power and efficiency: a rebuttal. Ecological Modelling, 20: 71-82.
Odum H.T., 1988. Self organization, transformity and information. Science, 242: 1132-1139.
Odum H.T., 1996. Environmental Accounting. Emergy and Environmental Decision Making. John Wiley & Sons, N.Y.
Odum, E.C., and Odum, H.T., 1980. Energy systems and environmental education. Pp. 213-231 in: Environmental :Education- Principles, Methods and Applications, Ed. by T.S. Bakshi and Z. Naveh. Plenum Press, New York.
Odum, E.C., and Odum, H.T., 1984. System of ethanol production from sugarcane in Brazil. Ciencia e Cultura, 37(11): 1849-1855.
Odum, E.C., Odum, H.T., and Peterson, N.S., 1995a. Using simulation to introduce systems approach in education. Chapter 31, pp. 346-352, in Maximum Power, ed. by C.A.S. Hall, University Press of Colorado, Niwot.
Odum, H. T., Brown, M. T., Whitefield, L. S., Woithe, R., and Doherty, S., 1995b. Zonal Organization of Cities and Environment: A Study of Energy System Basis for Urban Society. A Report to the Chiang Ching-Kuo Foundation for International Scholarly Exchange, Center for Environmental Policy, University of Florida, Gainesville, FL.
Odum, H.T, M.T. Brown, and S. Ulgiati. 1999. Ecosystems as Energetic Systems. pp.281-302 in S.E. Jorgensen and F. Muller (eds) Handbook of Ecosystem Theories. CRC Press, New York
Odum, H.T. 1971a. Environment, Power and Society. John Wiley, NY. 336 pp.
Odum, H.T. 1971b. An energy circuit language for ecological and social systems: its physical basis. Pp. 139-211, in Systems Analysis and Simulation in Ecology, Vol. 2, Ed. by B. Patten. Academic Press, New York.
Odum, H.T. 1972b. Chemical cycles with energy circuit models. Pp. 223-257, in Changing Chemistry of the Ocean, ed. by D. Dryssen and D. Jagner. Nobel Symposium 20. Wiley, New York.
Odum, H.T. 1973. Energy, ecology and economics. Royal Swedish Academy of Science. AMBIO 2(6):220-227.
Odum, H.T. 1976a. 'Energy quality and carrying capacity of the earth. Response at Prize Ceremony, Institute de la Vie, Paris. Tropical Ecology 16(l):1-8.
Odum, H.T. 1987a. Living with complexity. Pp. 19-85 in The Crafoord Prize in the Biosciences, 1987, Lectures. Royal Swedish Academy of Sciences, Stockholm, Sweden. 87 pp
Odum, H.T. 1987b. Models for national, international, and global systems policy. Chapter 13, pp. 203-251, in Economic-Ecological Modeling, ed. by L.C. Braat and W.F.J. Van Lierop. Elsevier Science Publishing, New York, 329 pp.
Odum, H.T. et al. 1976. Net energy Analysis of Alternatives for the United States. In U.S. Energy Policy: Trends and Goals. Part V - Middle and Long-term Energy Policies and Alternatives. 94th Congress 2nd Session Committee Print. Prepared for the Subcommittee on Energy and Power of the Committee on Interstate and Foreign Commerce of the U.S. House of Representatives, 66-723, U.S. Govt. Printing Office, Wash, DC. pp. 254-304.
Odum, H.T., 1975. Combining energy laws and corollaries of the maximum power principle with visual system mathematics. Pp. 239-263, in Ecosystems: Analysis and Prediction, ed. by Simon Levin. Proceedings of the conference on ecosystems at Alta, Utah. SIAM Institute for Mathematics and Society, Philadelphia.
Odum, H.T., 1980a. Biomass and Florida's future. Pp. 58-67 in: A Hearing before the Subcommittee on Energy Development and Applications of the Committee on Science and Technology of the U.S. House of Representatives, 96th Congress. Government Printing Office, Washington, D.C.
Odum, H.T., 1980b. Principle of environmental energy matching for estimating potential economic value: a rebuttal. Coastal Zone Management Journal, 5(3): 239-243.
Odum, H.T., 1982. Pulsing, power and hierarchy. Pp. 33-59, in Energetics and Systems, ed. by W.J. Mitsch, R.K. Ragade, R. W. Bosserman, and J.A. Dillon Jr., Ann Arbor Science, Ann Arbor, Michigan.
Odum, H.T., 1984a. Energy analysis of the environmental role in agriculture. Pp. 24-51, in Energy and Agriculture, ed. by G. Stanhill. Springer Verlag, Berlin. 192 pp.
Odum, H.T., 1985. Water conservation and wetland values. Pp. 98-111, in Ecological Considerations in Wetlands Treatment of Municipal Wastewaters, ed. by P.J. Godfrey, E.R. Kaynor, S. Pelezrski, and J. Benforado. Van Nostrand Reinhold, New York. 473 pp.
Odum, H.T., 1986. Enmergy in ecosystems. In Environmental Monographs and Symposia, N. Polunin, ed. John Wiley, NY. pp. 337-369.
Odum, H.T., 1994. Ecological and General Systems: An Introduction to Systems Ecology. University Press of Colorado, Niwot. 644 pp. Revised edition of Systems Ecology, 1983, Wiley.
Odum, H.T., 1995. Self organization and maximum power. Chapter 28, pp. 311-364 in Maximum Power, Ed. by C.A.S. Hall, University Press of Colorado, Niwot.
Odum, H.T., 2000. Handbook of Emergy Evaluation: A Compendium of Data for Emergy Computation Issued in a Series of Folios. Folio #2 – Emergy of Global processes. Center for Environmental Policy, Environmental (http://www.emergysystems.org/downloads/Folios/Folio_2.pdf)
Odum, H.T., and Arding, J.E., 1991. Emergy analysis of shrimp mariculture in Ecuador. Report to Coastal Studies Institute, University of Rhode Island, Narragansett. Center for Wetlands, University of Florida, Gainesville, pp. 87.
Odum, H.T., Gayle, T., Brown, M.T., and Waldman, J., 1978b. Energy analysis of the University of Florida. Center for Wetlands, University of Florida, Gainesville. Unpublished manuscript.
Odum, H.T., Kemp, W., Sell, M., Boynton W., and Lehman, M., 1978a. Energy Analysis and the coupling of man and estuaries. Environmental Management, 1: 297-315.
Odum, H.T., Lavine, M.J., Wang, F.C., Miller, M.A., Alexander, J.F., and Butler, T., 1983. Manual for using energy analysis for plant siting. Report to the Nuclear Regulatory Commission, Washington, DC. Report No. NUREG/CR-2443. National Technical Information Service, Springfield, Va. Pp. 242.
Odum, H.T., M.T. Brown and S.B. Williams. 2000. Handbook of Emergy Evaluation: A Compendium of Data for Emergy Computation Issued in a Series of Folios. Folio #1 - Introduction and Global Budget. Center for Environmental Policy, Environmental . (http://www.emergysystems.org/downloads/Folios/Folio_1.pdf)
Odum, W.P., Odum, E.P., and Odum, H.T., 1995c. Nature's Pulsing Paradigm. Estuaries 18(4): 547-555.
Peng, T., H.F. Lu, W.L. Wu, D.E. Campbell, G.S. Zhao, J.H. Zou, J. Chen. 2008. Should a small combined heat and power plant (CHP) open to its regional power and heat networks? Integrated economic, energy, and emergy evaluation of optimization plans for Jiufa CHP. Energy, Volume 33, Issue 3, March 2008, Pages 437-445
Pizzigallo, A.C.I., C. Granai, S. Borsa. 2008. The joint use of LCA and emergy evaluation for the analysis of two Italian wine farms. Journal of Environmental Management, Volume 86, Issue 2, January 2008, Pages 396-406
Prado-Jatar, M.A., and Brown, M.T., 1997. Interface ecosystems with an oil spill in a Venezuelan tropical savannah. Ecological Engineering, 8: 49-78.
Pulselli, R.M., E. Simoncini, R. Ridolfi, S. Bastianoni. 2008. Specific emergy of cement and concrete: An energy-based appraisal of building materials and their transport. Ecological Indicators, Volume 8, Issue 5, September 2008, Pages 647-656
Reiss, C.R. and M.T. Brown. 2007. Evaluation of Florida Palustrine Wetlands: Application of USEPA Levels 1, 2, and 3 Assessment Methods. Ecohealth 4:206-218.
Rótolo, G.C., T. Rydberg, G. Lieblein, C. Francis. 2007. Emergy evaluation of grazing cattle in Argentina's Pampas. Agriculture, Ecosystems & Environment, Volume 119, Issues 3-4, March 2007, Pages 383-395
Rydberg, T., A.C. Haden. 2006. Emergy evaluations of Denmark and Danish agriculture: Assessing the influence of changing resource availability on the organization of agriculture and society. Agriculture, Ecosystems & Environment, Volume 117, Issues 2-3, November 2006, Pages 145-158
Ulgiati, S., Odum, H.T., and Bastianoni, S., 1993. Emergy Analysis of Italian Agricultural System. The Role of Energy Quality and Environmental Inputs.In: Trends in Ecological Physical Chemistry. L. Bonati, U. Cosentino, M. Lasagni, G. Moro, D. Pitea and A. Schiraldi, Editors. Elsevier Science Publishers, Amsterdam, 187-215.
Ulgiati, S. and M.T. Brown. 2001. Emergy Evaluations and Environmental Loading of Alternative Electricity Production Systems. Journal of Cleaner Production 10:335-348
S. Giberna, P. Barbieri, E. Reisenhofer, P. Plossi. 2004. Emergy analysis of the phase of operation of the incineration of municipal waste in Trieste
Vassallo, P., C. Paoli, D.R. Tilley, M. Fabiano. 2009. Energy and resource basis of an Italian coastal resort region integrated using emergy synthesis Journal of Environmental Management, Volume 91, Issue 1, October 2009, Pages 277-289
Zhang, X., W.Jiang, S. Deng, K. Peng. 2009. Emergy evaluation of the sustainability of Chinese steel production during 1998–2004. Journal of Cleaner Production, Volume 17, Issue 11, July 2009, Pages 1030-1038
Zhang, Y., Z. Yang, X.Yu. 2009. Evaluation of urban metabolism based on emergy synthesis: A case study for Beijing (China). Ecological Modelling, Volume 220, Issues 13-14, 17 July 2009, Pages 1690-1696
