= Energy quality =

Measure of energy conversion ease

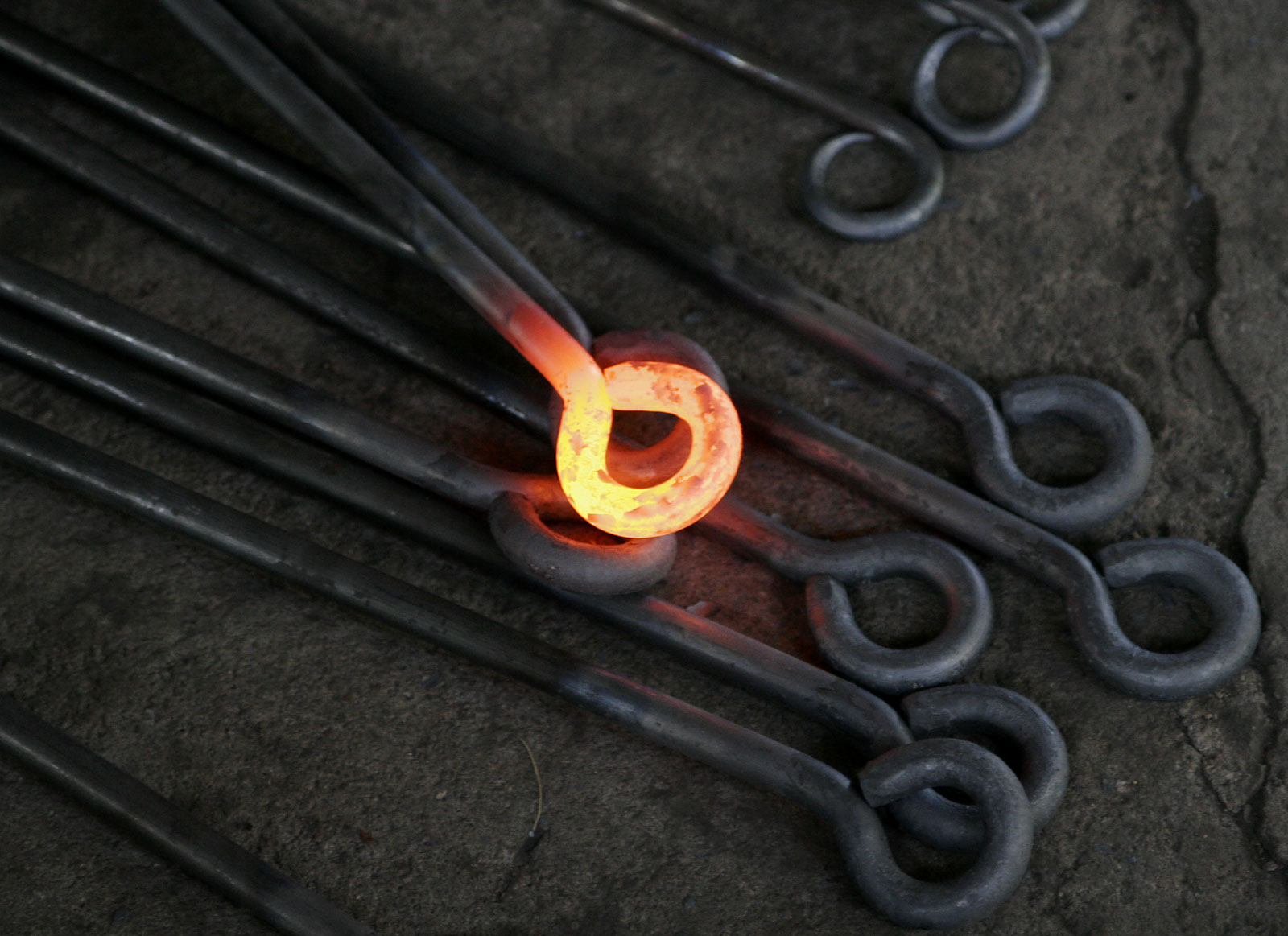
Thermal energy, a form of energy that depends on an object's temperature, is partly potential energy and partly kinetic energy.

Energy quality is a measure of the ease with which a form of energy can be converted to useful work or to another form of energy: i.e. its content of thermodynamic free energy. A high quality form of energy has a high content of thermodynamic free energy, and therefore a high proportion of it can be converted to work; whereas with low quality forms of energy, only a small proportion can be converted to work, and the remainder is dissipated as heat. The concept of energy quality is also used in ecology, where it is used to track the flow of energy between different trophic levels in a food chain and in thermoeconomics, where it is used as a measure of economic output per unit of energy. Methods of evaluating energy quality often involve developing a ranking of energy qualities in hierarchical order.

== Examples: Industrialization, Biology ==
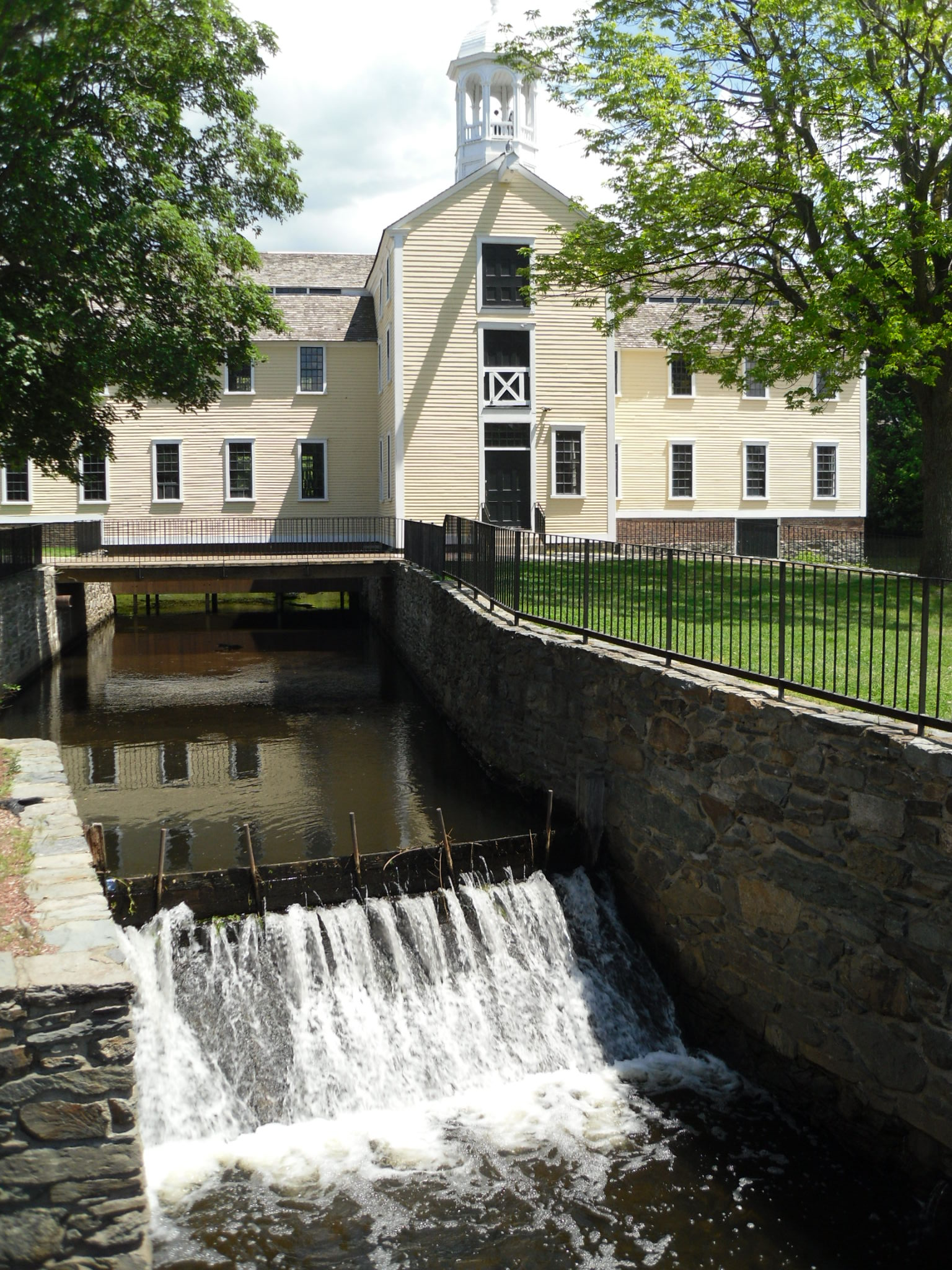
The Slater Mill Historic Site in Pawtucket, Rhode Island.

The consideration of energy quality was a fundamental driver of industrialization from the 18th through 20th centuries. Consider for example the industrialization of New England in the 18th century. This refers to the construction of textile mills containing power looms for weaving cloth. The simplest, most economical and straightforward source of energy was provided by water wheels, extracting energy from a millpond behind a dam on a local creek. If another nearby landowner also decided to build a mill on the same creek, the construction of their dam would lower the overall hydraulic head to power the existing waterwheel, thus hurting power generation and efficiency. This eventually became an issue endemic to the entire region, reducing the overall profitability of older mills as newer ones were built.

The search for higher quality energy was a major impetus throughout the 19th and 20th centuries. For example, burning coal to make steam to generate mechanical energy would not have been imaginable in the 18th century; by the end of the 19th century, the use of water wheels was long outmoded. Similarly, the quality of energy from electricity offers immense advantages over steam, but did not become economic or practical until the 20th century.

The above example focused on the economic impacts of the exploitation of energy. A similar scenario plays out in nature and biology, where living organisms can extract energy of varying quality from nature, ultimately driven by solar energy as the primary driver of thermodynamic disequilibrium on Earth. The ecological balance of ecosystems is predicated on the energy flows through the system. For example, rainwater drives the erosion of rocks, which liberates chemicals that can be used as nutrients; these are taken up by plankton, using solar energy to grow and thrive; whales obtain energy by eating plankton, thus indirectly using solar energy as well, but this time in a much more concentrated and higher quality form.

Water wheels are also driven by rainwater, via the solar evaporation-condensation water cycle; thus ultimately, industrial cloth-making was driven by the day-night cycle of solar irradiation. This is a holistic view of energy sources as a system-in-the-large. Thus, discussions of energy quality can sometimes be found in the Humanities, such as dialectics, Marxism and postmodernism. This is effectively because disciplines such as economics failed to recognize the thermodynamic inputs into the economy (now recognized as thermoeconomics), while disciplines such as physics and engineering were unable to address either the economic impacts of human activity, or the impacts of thermodynamic flows in biological ecosystems. Thus, the broad-stroke, global system-in-the-large discussions were taken up by those best trained for the nebulous, non-specific reasoning that such complex systems require. The resulting mismatch of vocabulary and outlook across disciplines can lead to considerable contention.

== History ==
According to Ohta, the ranking and scientific analysis of energy quality was first proposed in 1851 by William Thomson under the concept of "availability". This concept was continued in Germany by Z. Rant, who developed it under the title, "die Exergie" (the exergy). It was later continued and standardised in Japan. Exergy analysis now forms a common part of many industrial and ecological energy analyses. For example, I. Dincer and Y.A. Cengel state that energy forms of different qualities are now commonly dealt with in steam power engineering industry. Here the "quality index" is the relation of exergy to the energy content. However energy engineers were aware that the notion of heat quality involved the notion of value – for example A. Thumann wrote, "The essential quality of heat is not the amount but rather its 'value'" – which brings into play the question of teleology and wider, or ecological-scale goal functions. In an ecological context S.E. Jorgensen and G. Bendoricchio say that energy is used as a goal function in ecological models, and expresses energy "with a built-in measure of quality like energy".

== Energy quality evaluation methods ==
There appear to be two main kinds of methodology used for the calculation of energy quality. These can be classed as either receiver or donor methods. One of the main differences that distinguishes these classes is the assumption of whether energy quality can be upgraded in an energy transformation process.

Receiver methods: view energy quality as a measure and indicator of the relative ease with which energy converts from one form to another. That is, how much energy is received from a transformation or transfer process. For example, A. Grubler used two types of indicators of energetic quality pars pro toto: the hydrogen/carbon (H/C) ratio, and its inverse, the carbon intensity of energy. Grubler used the latter as an indicator of relative environmental quality. However, Ohta says that in multistage industrial conversion systems, such as a hydrogen production system using solar energy, the energy quality is not upgraded.

Donor methods: view energy quality as a measure of the amount of energy used in an energy transformation, and that goes into sustaining a product or service. That is how much energy is donated to an energy transformation process. These methods are used in ecological physical chemistry, and ecosystem evaluation. From this view, in contrast with that outlined by Ohta, energy quality is upgraded in the multistage trophic conversions of ecological systems. Here, upgraded energy quality has a greater capacity to feedback and control lower grades of energy quality. Donor methods attempt to understand the usefulness of an energetic process by quantifying the extent to which higher quality energy controls lower quality energy.

== Energy quality in physical-chemical science (direct energy transformations) ==
=== Constant energy form but variable energy flow ===
T. Ohta suggested that the concept of energy quality may be more intuitive if one considers examples where the form of energy remains constant but the amount of energy flowing, or transferred is varied. For instance if we consider only the inertial form of energy, then the energy quality of a moving body is higher when it moves with a greater velocity. If we consider only the heat form of energy, then a higher temperature has higher quality. And if we consider only the light form of energy then light with higher frequency has greater quality. All these differences in energy quality are therefore easily measured with the appropriate scientific instrument.

=== Variable energy form, but constant energy flow ===
The situation becomes more complex when the form of energy does not remain constant. In this context Ohta formulated the question of energy quality in terms of the conversion of energy of one form into another, that is the transformation of energy. Here, energy quality is defined by the relative ease with which the energy transforms, from form to form.

If energy A is relatively easier to convert to energy B but energy B is relatively harder to convert to energy A, then the quality of energy A is defined as being higher than that of B. The ranking of energy quality is also defined in a similar way.

Nomenclature: Prior to Ohta's definition above, A. W. Culp produced an energy conversion table describing the different conversions from one energy to another. Culp's treatment made use of a subscript to indicate which energy form is being talked about. Therefore, instead of writing "energy A", like Ohta above, Culp referred to "J_{e}", to specify electrical form of energy, where "J" refers to "energy", and the "e" subscript refers to electrical form of energy. Culp's notation anticipated Scienceman's (1997) later maxim that all energy should be specified as form energy with the appropriate subscript.

== Energy quality in biophysical economics (indirect energy transformations) ==
The notion of energy quality was also recognised in the economic sciences. In the context of biophysical economics energy quality was measured by the amount of economic output generated per unit of energy input. The estimation of energy quality in an economic context is also associated with embodied energy methodologies. Another example of the economic relevance of the energy quality concept is given by Brian Fleay. Fleay says that the "Energy Profit Ratio (EPR) is one measure of energy quality and a pivotal index for assessing the economic performance of fuels. Both the direct and indirect energy inputs embodied in goods and services must be included in the denominator." Fley calculates the EPR as the energy output/energy input.

== Ranking energy quality ==
=== Energy abundance and relative transformation ease as measure of hierarchical rank and/or hierarchical position ===
DIFFERENT HIERARCHICAL RANKS OF ENERGY FORM QUALITY
HIGHEST QUALITY
Ohta Ranking	Odum Ranking
Electromagnetic	Information
Mechanical	Human Services
Photon	Protein Food
Chemical	Electric Power
Heat	Food, Greens, Grains
	River-water potential
	Consolidated Fuels
	River Chemical energy
	Mechanical
	Tide
	Gross Photosynthesis
	Average wind
	Sunlight
LOWEST QUALITY

Ohta sought to order energy form conversions according to their quality and introduced a hierarchical scale for ranking energy quality based on the relative ease of energy conversion. It is evident that Ohta did not analyse all forms of energy. For example, water is left out of his evaluation. The ranking of energy quality is not determined solely with reference to the efficiency of the energy conversion. This is to say that the evaluation of "relative ease" of an energy conversion is only partly dependent on transformation efficiency. As Ohta wrote, "the turbine generator and the electric motor have nearly the same efficiency, therefore we cannot say which has the higher quality."

Ohta therefore also included, 'abundance in nature' as another criterion for the determination energy quality rank. For example, Ohta said that, "the only electrical energy which exists in natural circumstances is lightning, while many mechanical energies exist."

=== Transformity as an energy measure of hierarchical rank ===
Like Ohta, H.T. Odum also sought to order energy form conversions according to their quality, however his hierarchical scale for ranking was based on extending ecological system food chain concepts to thermodynamics rather than simply relative ease of transformation. For H.T. Odum, energy quality rank is based on the amount of energy of one form required to generate a unit of another energy form. The ratio of one energy form input to a different energy form output was what H.T. Odum and colleagues called transformity: "the EMERGY per unit energy in units of emjoules per joule."

== See also ==
- EKOenergy ecolabel for energy
- Green energy
- Eugene Green Energy Standard
- ISO 14001
- Monism
- Emergy
- Renewable energy
- Renewable energy development
- Transformity
- Thermodynamics
- Energy accounting
- Energy economics
- Pirsig's metaphysics of Quality
