= David M. Scienceman =

- Known for: Emergy synthesis
- Scientific career
- Fields: Mathematician and Natural Philosopher and Chemical Engineer and Nuclear Physicist

David M. Scienceman is an Australian scientist; he changed his name from David Slade by deed poll in 1972. McGhee (1990) wrote that his change of name from Slade to Scienceman was an experiment to create a movement of scientifically aware politicians. In a world dominated by scientific achievements and problems, Slade believed that there should be a political party that represented the scientific point of view (Cadzow 1984).

Scienceman has a mathematics and physics degree and a PhD in chemical engineering from Sydney University (Australia), on a scholarship from the Australian Atomic Energy Commission (Cadzow 1984).

At a meeting of the World Future Society in 1976, a group of American feminists told him his new name was unbearably sexist. He saw their point and decided that a better title for members of the Scientific Party would be "Sciencemate" (Cadzow 1984).

For Cadzow, Scienceman:

... believes it is possible to measure anything, even money, in terms of its embodied energy. "To operate a supply of banknotes you've got to have a very large commercial organisation. You've got to have banks, you've got to have printing houses. They themselves consume a large amount of energy". By comparing the money flow with the energy flow, which has been broken down to mathematical units, "we can say that a dollar is equivalent to so many units of embodied energy."(The Australian 1984, p. 7)

== Author of emergy nomenclature ==
Scienceman claimed to be the author of the nomenclature of "emergy". In a letter to the Ecological Engineering journal (1997, p. 209) he wrote:

"... as the author of the nomenclature 'emergy, empower, emdollar, embit, energy memory and the maximum empower principle'...

H.T. Odum (1997, p. 215) wrote:

... Scienceman contributed in major ways to the concepts and application of emergy evaluation off and on over a 10-year period. ... As a library scholar without equal, David researched the basis for scientific nomenclature and linguistic roots.
