= Environmental humanities =

Study of environmental issues, nature and culture

The environmental humanities (also ecological humanities) is an interdisciplinary area of research, drawing on the many environmental sub-disciplines that have emerged in the humanities over the past several decades, in particular environmental literature, environmental philosophy, environmental history, science and technology studies, environmental anthropology, conservation humanities, and environmental communication.

Environmental humanities employs humanistic questions about meaning, culture, values, ethics, and responsibilities to address pressing environmental problems. The environmental humanities aim to help bridge traditional divides between the sciences and the humanities, as well as between Western, Eastern, and Indigenous ways of relating to the natural world and the place of humans within it. The field also resists the traditional divide between "nature" and "culture," showing how many "environmental" issues have always been entangled in human questions of justice, labor, and politics. Environmental humanities is also a way of synthesizing methods from different fields to create new ways of thinking through environmental problems.

== Emergence of environmental humanities ==
Although the concepts and ideas underpinning environmental humanities date back centuries, the field consolidated under the name "environmental humanities" in the 2000s following steady developments of the 1970s, 1980s, and 1990s in humanities and social science fields such as literature, history, philosophy, gender studies, and anthropology. A group of Australian researchers used the name "ecological humanities" to describe their work in the 1990s; the field consolidated under the name "environmental humanities" around 2010. The journal Environmental Humanities was founded in 2012 and Resilience: A Journal of the Environmental Humanities in 2014, indicating the development of the field and the consolidation around this terminology.

There are dozens of environmental humanities centers, programs, and institutions around the world. Some of the more prominent ones are the fully funded Environmental Humanities Graduate Program at the University of Utah, the oldest environmental humanities graduate program in America, the Rachel Carson Center for Environment and Society (RCC) at LMU Munich, the Center for Culture, History, and Environment (CHE) at the University of Wisconsin–Madison, The Center for Energy and Environmental Research in the Human Sciences at Rice University, the Penn Program in Environmental Humanities at the University of Pennsylvania (2014-2024), the KTH Environmental Humanities Laboratory at KTH Royal Institute of Technology, The Greenhouse at the University of Stavanger, and the international Humanities for the Environment observatories.

Dozens of universities offer PhDs, Masters of Arts degrees, graduate certificates, and Bachelor of Arts degrees in environmental humanities. Courses in environmental humanities are taught on every continent.

The environmental humanities did not just emerge from Western academic thinkers: indigenous, postcolonial, and feminist thinkers have provided major contributions. These contributions include challenging the human-centered viewpoints that separate "nature" and "culture" and the white, male, European- and North American-centric viewpoints of what constitutes "nature"; revising the literary genre of "nature writing"; and creating new concepts and fields that bridge the academic and the political, such as "environmental justice," "environmental racism," "the environmentalism of the poor," "naturecultures," and "the posthuman."

== Connectivity ontology ==
The environmental humanities are characterised by a connectivity ontology and a commitment to two fundamental axioms relating to the need to submit to ecological laws and to see humanity as part of a larger living system.

One of the fundamental ontological presuppositions of environmental humanities is that the organic world and its inorganic parts are seen as a single system whereby each part is linked to each other part. This world view in turn shares an intimate connection with Lotka's physiological philosophy and the associated concept of the "World Engine". When we see everything as connected, then the traditional questions of the humanities concerning economic and political justice become enlarged, into a consideration of how justice is connected with our transformation of our environment and ecosystems.

The consequence of such connectivity ontology is, as proponents of the environmental humanities argue, that we begin to seek out a more inclusive concept of justice that includes non-humans within the domain of those to whom rights are owing. This broadened conception of justice involves "enlarged" or "ecological thinking", which presupposes the enhancement of knowledge sharing within fields of plural and diverse ‘knowledges’. This kind of knowledge sharing is called transdisciplinarity. It has links with the political philosophy of Ibn Khaldun, Hannah Arendt and the works of Italo Calvino. As Calvino put it, "enlarge[s] the sphere of what we can imagine". It also has connections with Leibniz's Enlightenment project where the sciences are simultaneously abridged while also being enlarged.

The situation is complicated, however, by the recognition of the fact that connections are both non-linear and linear. The environmental humanities, therefore, require both linear and non-linear modes of language through which reasoning about justice can be done. Thus there is a motivation to find linguistic modes which can adequately express both linear and non-linear connectivities.

== Axioms ==
According to some thinkers, there are three axioms of environmental humanities:

1. The axiom of submission to ecosystem laws;
2. The axiom of ecological kinship, which situates humanity as a participant in a larger living system; and
3. The axiom of the social construction of ecosystems and ecological unity, which states that ecosystems and nature may be merely convenient conceptual entities.

Putting the first and second axioms another way, the connections between and among living things are the basis for how ecosystems are understood to work, and thus constitute laws of existence and guidelines for behaviour.

The first of these axioms has a tradition in social sciences. From the second axiom the notions of "ecological embodiment/ embeddedness" and "habitat" have emerged from Political Theory with a fundamental connectivity to rights, democracy, and ecologism.

The third axiom comes from the strong 'self-reflective' tradition of all 'humanities' scholarship and it encourages the environmental humanities to investigate its own theoretical basis (and without which, the environmental humanities is just 'ecology').

== Contemporary ideas ==
=== Political economic ecology ===
Some theorists have suggested that the inclusion of non-humans in the consideration of justice links ecocentric philosophy with political economics. This is because the theorising of justice is a central activity of political economic philosophy. If in accordance with the axioms of environmental humanities, theories of justice are enlarged to include ecological values, then the necessary result is the synthesis of the concerns of ecology with that of political economy: i.e. political economic ecology.

=== Energy systems language ===
The question of what language can best depict the linear and non-linear causal connections of ecological systems appears to have been taken up by the school of ecology known as systems ecology. To depict the linear and non-linear internal relatedness of ecosystems where the laws of thermodynamics hold significant consequences, Systems ecologist H.T. Odum (1994) predicated the Energy Systems Language on the principles of ecological energetics. In ecological energetics, just as in environmental humanities, the causal bond between connections is considered an ontic category. Moreover, as a result of simulating ecological systems with the energy systems language, H.T. Odum made the controversial suggestion that embodied energy could be understood as value, which in itself is a step into the field of Political Economic Ecology noted above.

== See also ==
- Animal studies
- Anthropocene
- Bioprospecting
- Bioregionalism
- Biosemiotics
- Climate justice
- Cultural geography
- Deep ecology
- Ecocentrism
- Ecocriticism
- Ecofeminism
- Ecomusicology
- Ecosemiotics
- Environmental history
- Environmental justice
- Environmental philosophy
- Green politics
- Political ecology
- Posthumanism
- Sexecology
- Social ecology
- Systems ecology
- Value theory
