= Terminal investment hypothesis =

The terminal investment hypothesis is the idea in life history theory that as an organism's residual reproductive value (or the total reproductive value minus the reproductive value of the current breeding attempt) decreases, its reproductive effort will increase. Thus, as an organism's prospects for survival decreases (through age or an immune challenge, for example), it will invest more in reproduction. This hypothesis is generally supported in animals, although results contrary to it do exist.

== Definition ==
The terminal investment hypothesis posits that as residual reproductive value (measured as the total reproductive value minus the reproductive value of the current breeding attempt) decreases, reproductive effort increases. This is based on the cost of reproduction hypothesis, which says that an increase in resources dedicated to current reproduction decreases the potential for future reproduction. But, as the residual reproductive value decreases, the importance of this trade-off decreases, leading to increased investment in the current reproductive attempt. This terminal investment hypothesis can be illustrated by the equation

$\hat{c}=\frac{(a+b)\phi}{(\Phi-\phi)}$,

where $\Phi$ is the total reproductive value, $\phi$ the reproductive value of the current breeding attempt, $a$ the proportionate increase in $\phi$ resulting from a positive decision (where a yes-no decision must be made regarding whether or not to increase reproductive effort), $\hat{c}$ the cost of a positive decision where there is no selective pressure for either a positive decision or negative decision (this variable is also known as the "barely-justified cost"). The variable $b$ is the proportionate loss in $\phi$ from a negative decision. The barely-justified cost is thus inversely proportional to the residual reproductive value. When the level of reproductive investment has not reached the point where the equation above is true, more positive decisions about reproductive effort will be made. Thus, as the residual reproductive value decreases, more positive decisions need to be made so the equation is equal.

== In animals ==
In animals, most tests of the terminal investment hypothesis are correlations of age and reproductive effort, immune challenges on all age stages, and immune challenges on older ages versus younger ages. The last type of test is considered to be a more reliable measure of senescence's effect on reproductive effort, as younger individuals should reduce reproductive effort to reduce their chance of death because of their high future reproductive prospects, while older animals should increase effort because of their low future prospects. Overall, the terminal investment hypothesis is generally supported in a variety of animals.

=== In birds ===
A study on blue tits published in 2000 found that individuals injected with a human diphtheria–tetanus vaccine fed their nestlings less than those injected with a control solution. In a study published in 2004, house sparrows that were injected with a Newcastle disease vaccine were more likely to lay a replacement clutch after their first clutch had been artificially removed than those that were injected with a control solution. In a study published in 2006, old blue-footed boobies injected with lipopolysaccharides (to challenge the immune system) before laying fledged more young than normal, whereas young individuals fledged less than normal. An increase in maternal effort in immune challenged birds may be mediated by the hormone corticosterone; a study published in 2015 found that house wrens injected with lipopolysaccharides increased foraging, and that measurements of corticosterone from eggs laid after injection found a positive correlation of this hormone with maternal foraging rates.

=== In insects ===
A study published in 2009 supported the cost of reproduction and terminal investment hypotheses in the burying beetle. It found that beetles manipulated to overproduce young (by replacing a 30 grams (1.1 oz) mouse carcass with a 20 grams (0.71 oz) carcass) had shorter lifespans than those that bred on just 30 grams (1.1 oz) carcasses, followed by those that had a 20 grams (0.71 oz) carcass. In turn, non-breeding beetles had a significantly longer lifespan than those that bred. This supports the cost of reproduction hypothesis. Another experiment from the same study found beetles that first bred at 65 days had a larger brood size before dispersal (before the larvae start to pupate in the soil) than those that initially bred at 28 days. This supports the terminal investment hypothesis, and prevents the effect of an increased average brood size in older animals due to differential survival of quality individuals.

=== In flatworms ===
A study published in 2004 on the flatworm Diplostomum spathaceum found that as its intermediate host, a snail, aged, production of cercariae (which are passed on to the final host, a fish) decreased. This is in line with the bet hedging hypothesis, which, in this case, says that the flatworm should attempt to keep its host alive longer so that more young can be produced; it does not support the terminal investment hypothesis.

=== In mammals ===
A study published in 2002 found results contrary to the terminal investment hypothesis in reindeer. Calf weight peaked at the mother's seventh year of age, and declined thereafter. However, this would only be opposed to the hypothesis if reproductive costs did not increase with age. An alternative hypothesis, the senescence hypothesis, positing that reproductive output declines with age-related loss of function, was supported by the study. These two hypotheses are not necessarily mutually exclusive; a study on rhesus macaques published in 2010 strongly supported the senescence hypothesis and weakly supported the terminal investment hypothesis. It found that older mothers were lighter, less active, and had lighter infants with reduced survival rates compared to younger mothers (supporting the senescence hypothesis), but that older individuals spent more time in contact with their young (supporting the terminal investment hypothesis). Additionally, a study published in 1982 on red deer on the island of Rhum found that while older mothers produced less offspring (and lighter offspring, when they did) than expected for a given body weight, they had longer suckling bouts (which had previously been correlated with milk yield, calf body condition in early winter, and calf survival to spring) compared to younger mothers.

=== In reptiles ===
A study on spotted turtles published in 2008 found that individuals in very poor condition sometimes did not breed. This is consistent with the bet hedging hypothesis, and indicates decision making on a large temporal scale (as spotted turtles may live for 65 to 110 years). However, individuals in poor condition generally produced a relatively large amount of small eggs; consistent with the terminal investment hypothesis.

== In plants ==
Although the terminal investment hypothesis has been relatively widely studied in animals, there have been few studies of the hypothesis' application to plants. One study on members of the long-lived oak genus Quercus found that trees declined in condition towards the end of their lifespan, and did not invest an increasing proportion of their decreasing resources in reproduction.
