= Karin Limburg =

Ecologist

Karin Limburg is a professor in the department of Environmental and Forest Biology at SUNY-ESF.

== Biography ==
She graduated with a double AB degree in Ecology and Conservation from Vassar College, and then studied Systems Ecology under Howard T. Odum at the University of Florida, Gainesville for her MS degree. She completed her Ph.D. under the supervision of Simon Levin at Cornell University in 1994. A broadly trained ecologist, she has spent most of her career inferring water chemistry and fish ecology from careful examination of fish otoliths. Otoliths are small calcified structures that help fish to hear and balance, and they make excellent subjects for sclerochronology. Most recently, her studies have focused on the looming problem of the deoxygenation of the oceans as a result of global climate change.

In addition to her studies of otoliths, early in her career, Limburg contributed to a now seminal study led by Robert Costanza that was one of the first to attempt to place a value on worldwide ecosystem services that still continues to be frequently invoked in discussions of conservation biology. In a later paper led by Limburg, she and her coauthors argued that economic decisions need to be made in light of an understanding of ecosystem dynamics, including the potential for nonlinearity. Building upon the conceptual foundation of their earlier publications, in 2010 Limburg, Costanza, and Ida Kubiszewski edited the inaugural edition of the Annals of the New York Academy of Sciences Ecological Economics Reviews.

As of December 2019, Limburg has published more than 120 peer-reviewed articles, and her work has been cited more than 32,000 times. In 2010, SUNY-ESF honored Limburg with the "Exemplary Researcher award." In 2018 she was one of the recipients of the Chancellor's Award for Excellence in Scholarship and Creative Activities.
