= Energy system (disambiguation) =

Energy system may refer to:

- Energy system, a system primarily designed to supply energy-services to end-users
- Electric power system, for the supply, transfer, and use of electric power
- Thermodynamic system, a physics concept for analysis of thermal energy exchange
- Bioenergetic systems, metabolic processes for converting energy in living organisms

== See also ==
- Energy modeling
- Energy Systems Language
