= Cécile Roudeau =

French professor

Cécile Roudeau (born 1970) is a professor of 19th-century American literature at Université Paris Cité.

Roudeau is one of the head editors of Transatlantica: American Studies Journal (since 2015) as well as the head of LARCA (since 2019), an interdisciplinary research unit of Université de Paris and CNRS dedicated to the study of the culture of English-speaking countries. As a researcher, she has studied the notion of place in the works of 19th century female writers from New England. She has also translated The Country of the Pointed Firs and other Dunner Landing Stories by Sarah Orne Jewett into French. As the head of LARCA, she has been contributing to the development of the field of environmental humanities in France.
