= Patrick Holt Leslie =

Patrick Holt Leslie (1900 – June 1972) nickname "George" was a Scottish physiologist best known for his contributions to population dynamics, including the development of the Leslie matrix, a mathematical tool widely used in ecological and demographic studies.

== Career ==
Leslie was born in 1900 near Edinburgh, Scotland. He pursued his education at Christ Church, Oxford, where he earned a bachelor's degree in physiology in 1921. However, due to a serious lung disease, he was unable to complete his medical studies. Following this, Leslie worked as an assistant in bacteriology in the Department of Pathology for several years.

In 1935, Leslie joined the Bureau of Animal Population, a research center established by Charles Elton at Oxford. He had no formal training in advanced mathematics and lived a fairly quiet and somewhat secluded life partly due to his past illness. During World War II, the bureau shifted its focus to controlling rat and mouse populations in grain silos. Leslie's pioneering work in population studies began with calculating the intrinsic rate of increase for voles, Microtus agrestis, using age-specific birth and death rates with methods originally developed by Alfred J. Lotka, a method previously applied only to humans. He later extended these calculations to other species like brown rats, Orkney voles, and flour beetles.

In 1945, Leslie published his seminal work in Biometrika, titled "On the Use of Matrices in Certain Population Mathematics". This paper introduced the Leslie matrix, a mathematical model for studying population dynamics. The method simplifies computations of population growth parameters, such as R_{0} (net reproductive rate) and R_{1} (intrinsic growth rate), particularly with modern computational tools capable of analyzing eigenvalues and eigenvectors.

After the war, Leslie expanded the application of his matrix method to study the growth rates of various animal species, including birds and beetles. He worked on the statistical methods for marking and recapturing live-trapped small rodents, utilizing field data from Dennis and Helen Chitty on voles, with applications beyond rodents. Second, he conducted groundbreaking studies on stochastic equations to better understand predator-prey and interspecies relationships, contrasting these with simpler deterministic models. This work was supported by J.C. Gower's programming expertise on Rothamsted Research's computer. From 1948, Leslie collaborated closely with Thomas Park of the University of Chicago, who studied competition between Tribolium flour beetles. Leslie developed equations that successfully modeled and explained the intricate outcomes of these experiments.

He earned the honorary Doctor of Science at Oxford based on the results of his extensive research. Leslie retired in 1967, the same year that the Bureau of Animal Population was integrated into Oxford's Department of Zoology following Charles Elton's retirement. Leslie died in 1972.

== Bibliography ==
- Leslie, P. H. (November 1945). "On the Use of Matrices in Certain Population Mathematics". Biometrika. 33 (3): 183–212. doi:10.2307/2332297. JSTOR 2332297.
- Leslie, P. H. (December 1948). "Some Further Notes on the Use of Matrices in Population Mathematics". Biometrika. 35 (3/4): 213–245. doi:10.2307/2332342. JSTOR 2332342.
- Leslie, P. H. (June 1958). "A Stochastic Model for Studying the Properties of Certain Biological Systems by Numerical Methods". Biometrika. 45 (1/2): 16–31. doi:10.2307/2333042. JSTOR 2333042.
- Leslie, P. H.; Gower, J. C. (December 1960). "The Properties of a Stochastic Model for the Predator-Prey Type of Interaction Between Two Species". Biometrika. 47 (3/4): 219. doi:10.2307/2333294. JSTOR 2333294.
