= Charles A. S. Hall =

American systems ecologist

- Born: Charles Addison Scott Hall; 1943 (age 82–83); Hingham, Massachusetts, U.S.
- Education: Colgate University; Pennsylvania State University; University of North Carolina
- Known for: work on Peak Oil
- Spouse: Myrna Hall
- Scientific career
- Fields: Ecology

Charles A. S. Hall (born 1943) is an American systems ecologist and ESF Foundation Distinguished Professor at State University of New York in the College of Environmental Science & Forestry.

== Biography ==
Hall was born near Boston, and received a B.A. in biology from Colgate University, and an M.A. from Penn State University. He trained as systems ecologist by Howard Odum at the University of North Carolina, where he received a PhD.

Since then he has had a diverse career at Brookhaven Laboratory, The Ecosystems Center at the Marine Biological Laboratory, Woods Hole, Cornell University, University of Montana and, for the last 20 years, at the State University of New York College of Environmental Science and Forestry (SUNY ESF).

Hall, professor of systems ecology at SUNY-ESF teaches a freshman course called The Global Environment and the Evolution of Human Culture and graduate-level courses in Systems Ecology, Ecosystems, Energy systems, Tropical Development and Biophysical Economics.

Hall retired from full-time teaching in June 2012, and he now works to consolidate his life's work into a format that will continue to be useful for future research.

== Work ==
Hall's research interests are in the field of Systems ecology with strong interests in biophysical economics, and the relation of energy to society. His work has involved streams, estuaries and tropical forests but focused increasingly on human-dominated ecosystems in the US and Latin America. His research reflects his interest in understanding and developing analyses and computer simulation models of the complex systems of nature and humans and their interactions. Halls focus has been on energy as it relates to economics and environment. His focus is studying material and energy flows referred to as Industrial ecology, and applying this perspective, to attempting to understand human economies from a biophysical rather than just social perspective.

=== Systems ecology ===
Hall, and other biophysical economic thinkers are trained in ecology and evolutionary biology, fields that break down the natural world as done also by physicists. These views hold the global economy in a different perspective that mainstream economists do not share. Central to Halls argument is an understanding that the survival of all living creatures is limited by the concept of energy return on investment (EROEI): that any living thing or living societies can survive only so long as they are capable of getting more net energy from any activity than they expend during the performance of that activity.

=== Biophysical economics ===
"Energy used by the economy is a proxy of the amount of real work done in our economy," according to Charles A. Hall. In the 1980s, Hall and others hypothesised, "Over time, the Dow Jones should snake about the real amount of work." Twenty years later, a century's market and energy data shows that whenever the Dow Jones Industrial Average spikes faster than US energy consumption, it crashes: 1929, 1970s, the dot.com bubble, and now with the mortgage collapse.

Nicholas Georgescu-Roegen (a Romanian-born economist whose work in the 1970s began to define this new approach) models the economy as a living system. Like all life, it draws from its environment valuable (or “low entropy”) matter and energy, for animate life, food; for an economy, energy, ores, the raw materials provided by plants and animals. And like all life, an economy emits a high-entropy wake, it spews degraded matter and energy, that is... waste heat, waste gases, toxic byproducts, the molecules of iron lost to rust and abrasion. Low entropy emissions include trash and pollution in all their forms. Matter taken up into the economy can be recycled, using energy; but energy, used once, is forever unavailable to us at that level again. The law of entropy commands a one-way flow downward from more to less useful forms. Thus, Georgescu-Roegen, paraphrasing the economist Alfred Marshall, said: “Biology, not mechanics, is our Mecca.”

== Books ==
- 1977 : Hall, C.A.S. and J.W. Day (eds.) Ecosystem modeling in theory and practice. An introduction with case histories. Wiley Interscience, NY.
- 1986: Hall, C.A.S., C.J. Cleveland and R. Kaufmann. Energy and Resource Quality: The ecology of the economic process. Wiley Interscience, NY. 577 pp. (Second Edition. University Press of Colorado).
- 1989 Day, J.W., C.A.S. Hall, M. Kemp and A. Yanez-Arenciba. 1989. Estuarine Ecology. Wiley Interscience. New York. 558 pp.
- 1989 Hall, C.A.S. Maximum power: the ideas and applications of H.T. Odum. University Press of Colorado.
- 2000 Hall, C.A.S. Quantifying sustainable development: The future of tropical Economies. Academic Press, San Diego.
- 2007 LeClerc, G. and C.A.S. Hall. (eds) Making World Development Work: Scientific alternatives to neoclassical economic theory. University of New Mexico Press, Albuquerque. 2007.
- 2012 : Spain’s Photovoltaic Revolution: The energy return on investment with Pedro Prieto (Springer)
- 2012 : The Chinese Oil Industry: History and Future with Lianyong Feng, Yan Hu and Jianliang Wang (Springer)
- 2012 : The First Half of the Age of Oil: An Exploration of the Work of Colin Campbell and Jean Laherrère with Carlos Ramírez-Pascualli (Springer)
- 2012 : Energy and the Wealth of Nations: Understanding the Biophysical Economy with Kent A. Klitgaard (Springer)
- 2013 : Hall, Charles and Hanson, Doug.New Studies on EROI. Consolidation of papers published in Sustainabilities in 2011 MDPI Basil.
- 2016 : America's Most Sustainable Cities and Regions: Surviving the 21st Century Megatrends with Day, John W. (Springer)
- 2017 : Energy Return on Investment: A unifying principle for biology, Economics and sustainability (Springer)
- 2018 : Energy and the Wealth of Nations: An introduction to BioPhysical Economics (2nd Edition) with Kent A. Klitgaard (Springer)

== See also ==
- Systems ecology
- Energy quality
- Energy accounting
- Ecological economics
- Energy economics
- Industrial ecology
- Natural capital
- Econophysics
- Sustainability
- Environmental science
- Thermoeconomics
