= Maximum power =

Maximum power can refer to:

- Maximum power transfer theorem in electronics
- Maximum power principle in systems theory
- Maximum power point tracking in energy extraction, most commonly photovoltaic solar systems

== See also ==
- Max Power (disambiguation)
