= Howard T. Odum =

American ecologist (1924–2002)

Howard Thomas Odum
- Born: September 1, 1924; Chapel Hill, North Carolina, United States
- Died: September 11, 2002 (aged 78); Gainesville, Florida, U.S.
- Education: University of North Carolina at Chapel Hill; Yale University
- Known for: Ecological economics, ecological engineering, emergy, maximum power principle, systems ecology
- Parents: Howard W. Odum (father); Anna Louise Odum (née Kranz) (mother)
- Relatives: Eugene Odum (brother)
- Awards: Crafoord Prize (1987)
- Scientific career
- Fields: Zoology, meteorology, ecology and systems ecology

Howard Thomas Odum (September 1, 1924 – September 11, 2002), usually cited as H. T. Odum, was an American ecologist. He is known for his pioneering work on ecosystem ecology, and for his provocative proposals for additional laws of thermodynamics, informed by his work on general systems theory.

== Biography ==
Odum was the third child of Howard W. Odum, an American sociologist, and his wife, Anna Louise (née Kranz) Odum (1888–1965). He was the younger brother of Eugene Odum. Their father "encouraged his sons to go into science and to develop new techniques to contribute to social progress". Howard learned his early scientific lessons about (a) birds from his brother, (b) fish and the philosophy of biology while working after school for marine zoologist Robert Coker, and (c) electrical circuits from The Boy Electrician (1929) by Alfred Powell Morgan.

Howard Thomas studied biology at the University of North Carolina at Chapel Hill, where he published his first paper while still an undergraduate. His education was interrupted for three years by his World War II service with the Army Air Force in Puerto Rico and the Panama Canal Zone, where he worked as a tropical meteorologist. After the war, he returned to the University of North Carolina and completed his B.S. in zoology (Phi Beta Kappa) in 1947.

In 1947, Odum married Virginia Wood, and they later had two children. After Wood's death in 1973, he married Elisabeth C. Odum (who had four children from her previous marriage) in 1974. Odum's advice on how to manage a blended family was to be sure to keep talking; Elisabeth's was to hold back on discipline and new rules.

In 1950, Odum earned his Ph.D. in zoology at Yale University, under the guidance of G. Evelyn Hutchinson. His dissertation was titled The Biogeochemistry of Strontium: With Discussion on the Ecological Integration of Elements, which brought him into the emerging field of systems ecology. He made a meteorological "analysis of the global circulation of strontium, [and] anticipated in the late 1940s the view of the earth as one great ecosystem".

While at Yale, Howard began his lifelong collaborations with his brother Eugene. In 1953, they published the first English-language textbook on systems ecology, Fundamentals of Ecology. Howard wrote the chapter on energetics, which introduced his energy circuit language. They continued to collaborate in research as well as writing for the rest of their lives. For Howard, his energy systems language (which he called "energese") was itself a collaborative tool.

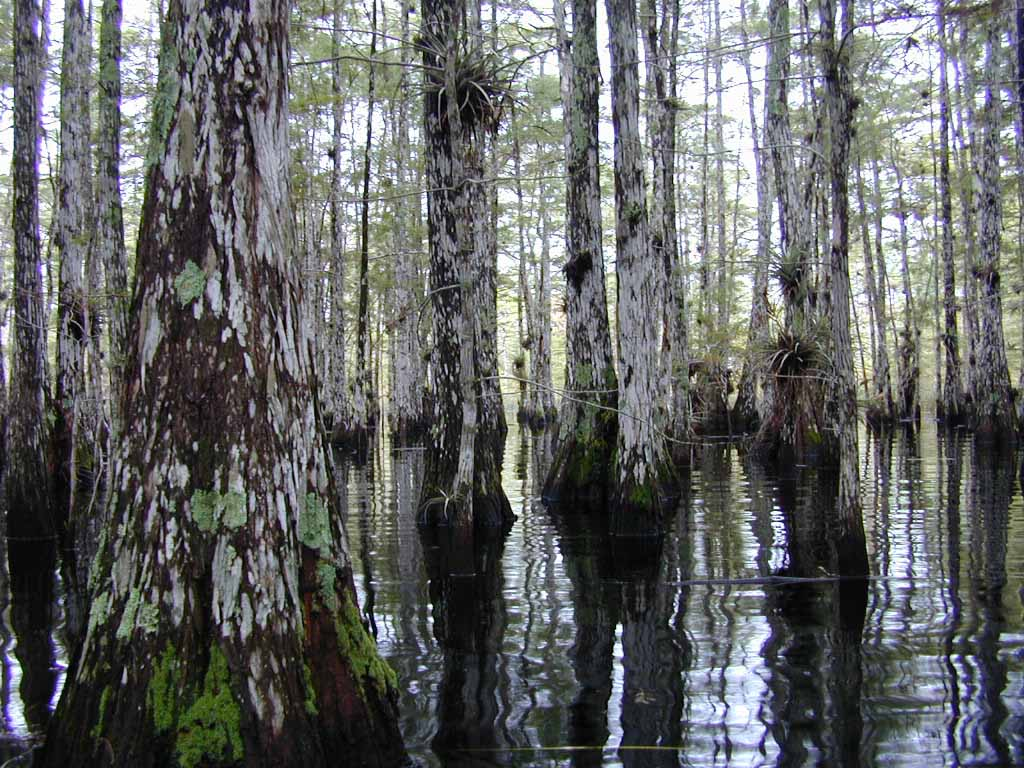
Florida Cypress Dome in the Big Cypress National Preserve

From 1956 to 1963, Odum worked as the director of the Marine Institute of the University of Texas. During this time, he became aware of the interplay of ecological-energetic and economic forces. He taught in the Department of Zoology at the University of North Carolina at Chapel Hill, and was one of the professors in the new curriculum of Marine Sciences until 1970.

That year he moved to the University of Florida, where he taught in the Environmental Engineering Sciences Department, founded and directed the Center for Environmental Policy, and founded the university's Center for Wetlands in 1973; it was the first center of its kind in the world that is still in operation today. Odum continued this work for 26 years until his retirement in 1996.

In the 1960s and 1970s, Odum was also chairman of the International Biological Program's Tropical Biome planning committee. He was supported by large contracts with the United States Atomic Energy Commission, resulting in participation by nearly 100 scientists, who conducted radiation studies of a tropical rainforest. His featured project at University of Florida in the 1970s was on recycling treated sewage into cypress swamps. This was one of the first projects to explore the now widespread approach of using wetlands as water quality improvement ecosystems. This is one of his most important contributions to the beginnings of the field of ecological engineering.

In his last years, Odum was Graduate Research Professor Emeritus and Director of the Center for Environmental Policy. He was an avid birdwatcher in both his professional and personal life.

The Ecological Society awarded Odum its Mercer Award to recognize his contributions to the study of the coral reef on Eniwetok Atoll. Odum also received the French Prix de Vie, and the Crafoord Prize of the Royal Swedish Academy of Science, considered the Nobel equivalent for bioscience. Charles A. S. Hall described Odum as one of the most innovative and important thinkers of the time. Hall noted that Odum, either alone or with his brother Eugene, received essentially all international prizes awarded to ecologists. The only higher education institute to award honorary degrees to both Odum brothers was Ohio State University, which honored Howard in 1995 and Euene in 1999.

Odum's contributions to ecosystems ecology have been recognized by the Mars Society, who named their experimental station the "H. T. Odum Greenhouse" at the suggestion of his former student Patrick Kangas. Kangas and his student, David Blersch, made significant contributions to the design of the waste water recycling system on the station.

Odum's students have furthered his work at institutions around the world, most notably Mark Brown at the University of Florida, David Tilley and Patrick Kangas at the University of Maryland, Daniel Campbell at the United States Environmental Protection Agency, Enrique Ortega at the UNICAMP in Brazil, and Sergio Ulgiati at the University of Siena. Work done at these institutions continues to evolve and propagate the Odum's concept of emergy. His former students Bill Mitsch, Robert Costanza, and Karin Limburg are some former students who have been recognized internationally for their contributions to ecological engineering, ecological economics, ecosystem science, wetland ecology, estuarine ecology, ecological modeling, and related fields.

== Work: an overview ==
Odum left a large legacy in many fields associated with ecology, systems, and energetics. He studied ecosystems all over the world, and pioneered the study of several areas, some of which are now distinct fields of research. According to Hall (1995, p.ix), Odum published one of the first significant papers in each of the following areas:

- Ecological modeling (Odum 1960a)
- Ecological engineering (Odum et al. 1963)
- Ecological economics (Odum 1971)
- Estuarine ecology (Odum and Hoskins 1958)
- Tropical ecosystems ecology (Odum and Pidgeon 1970)
- General systems theory

Odum's contributions to these and other areas are summarized below.

Odum also wrote on radiation ecology, systems ecology, unified science, and the microcosm. He was one of the first to discuss the use of ecosystems for life-support function in space travel. Some have suggested that Odum was technocratic in orientation, while others believe that he sided with those calling for "new values".

== Ecological modeling ==
=== A new integrative approach in ecology ===
In his 1950 Ph.D. thesis, Odum gave a novel definition of ecology as the study of large entities (ecosystems) at the "natural level of integration". In the traditional role of an ecologist, one of Odum's doctoral aims was to recognize and classify large cyclic entities (ecosystems). However, another one of his aims was to make predictive generalizations about ecosystems, such as the whole world for example. For Odum, as a large entity, the world constituted a revolving cycle with high stability. It was the presence of stability, which Odum believed enabled him to talk about the teleology (i.e., intrinsic end purpose) of such systems. While he was writing his thesis, Odum felt that the principle of natural selection was more than empirical, because it had a teleological, "stability over time" component. As an ecologist interested in the behavior and function of large entities over time, Odum sought to give a more general statement of natural selection so that it was equally applicable to large entities as it was to small entities traditionally studied in biology.

Odum also wanted to extend the scope and generality of natural selection to include large entities such as the world. This extension relied on the definition of an entity as a combination of properties that have some stability with time. Odum's approach was motivated by Lotka's idea's on the energetics of evolution.

=== Ecosystem simulation ===
Odum used an analog of electrical energy networks to model the energy flow pathways of ecosystems. His analog electrical models had a significant role in the development of his approach to systems and have been recognized as one of the earliest instances of systems ecology.

Electron flow in the electrical network represented the flow of material (e.g. carbon) in the ecosystem, charge in a capacitor was analogous to storage of a material, and the model was scaled to the ecosystem of interest by adjusting the size of electrical component.

=== Ecological analog of Ohm's Law ===
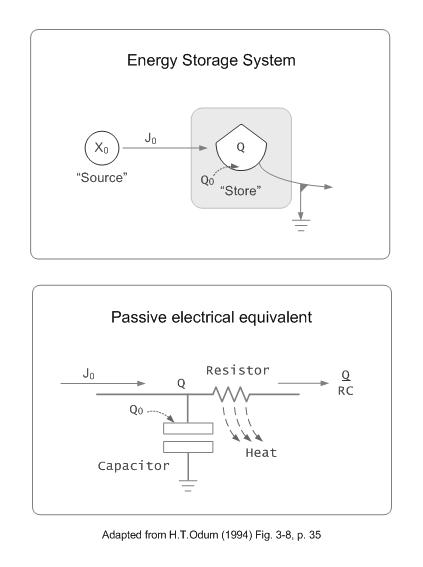
Passive electrical equivalent of Energy Systems Language storage icon

In the 1950s Odum introduced his electrical circuit diagrams of ecosystems to the Ecological Society of America. He claimed that energy was driven through ecological systems by an "ecoforce" analogous to the role of voltage in electrical circuits.

Odum developed an analogue of Ohm's Law which aimed to be a representation of energy flows through ecosystems. In terms of steady state thermodynamics, Ohm's Law can be considered a special case of a more general flux law, where the flux ($J$) "is proportional to the driving thermodynamic force ($X$) with conductivity ($C$)", or $J = CX$.

Kangas states that Odum concluded that as thermodynamic systems, ecosystems should also obey the force-flux law, and that Ohm's law and passive electrical analog circuits can be used to simulate ecosystems. In this simulation, Odum attempted to derive an ecological analog for electrical voltage. Voltage, or driving force, is related to the biomass in pounds per acre. The analogous concept required is the biomass activity, that is, the thermodynamic thrust, which may be linear. Exactly what this is in nature is still uncertain, as it is a new concept.

Such a consideration led Odum to ask two important methodological questions:

- What is the electrical significance of a function observed in nature?
- Given an electrical unit in a circuit, what is it in the ecological system?

For example, what is a diode in nature? One needs a diode to allow biomass to accumulate after the voltage of the sun has gone down, or else the circuit reverses. Higher organisms like fish are diodes.

=== The Silver Springs study ===
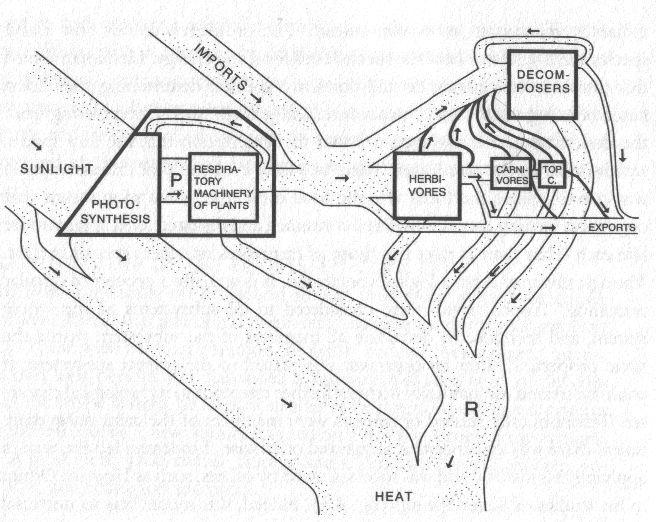
Energy Diagram: energy and matter flows through an ecosystem, adapted from the Silver Springs model. H are herbivores, C are carnivores, TC are top carnivores, and D are decomposers. Squares represent biotic pools and ovals are fluxes or energy or nutrients from the system.

Silver Springs is a common type of spring-fed stream in Florida with a constant temperature and chemical composition. The study Odum conducted here was the first complete analysis of a natural ecosystem.

Odum started with an overall model and in his early work used a diagramming methodology very similar to the Sankey diagrams used in chemical process engineering.

Starting from that overall model, Odum "mapped in detail all the flow routes to and from the stream. He measured the energy input of sun and rain, and of all organic matter - even those of the bread the tourists threw to the ducks and fish - and then measured the energy that gradually left the spring. In this way he was able to establish the stream's energy budget."

=== Ecological and biological energetics ===
Around 1955 Odum directed studies into radioecology, which included the effects of radiation on the tropical rainforest in El Verde, Puerto Rico (Odum and Pidgeon), and the coral reefs and ocean ecology at Eniwetok atoll. The Odum brothers were approached by the Atomic Energy Commission to undertake a detailed study of the atoll after nuclear testing; the atoll was sufficiently radioactive that upon their arrival the Odums were able to produce an autoradiographic image of a coral head by placing it on photographic paper. These studies were early applications of energy concepts to ecological systems, and explored the implications of the laws of thermodynamics when used in these new settings.

From this view, biogeochemical cycles are driven by radiant energy. Odum expressed the balance between energy input and output as the ratio of production (P) to respiration (R): P-R. He classified water bodies based on their P-R ratios, which separated autotrophic from heterotrophic ecosystems: "[Odum's] measurements of flowing water metabolism were measurements of whole systems. Odum was measuring the community as a system, not adding up the metabolism of the components as Lindeman and many others had done". This reasoning appears to have followed that of Odum's doctoral supervisor, G. E. Hutchinson, who thought that if a community were an organism then it must have a form of metabolism. However, Golley notes that Odum attempted to go beyond the reporting of mere ratios, a move which resulted in the first serious disagreement in systems energetics.

=== Maximum power theory and the proposal for additional laws of thermodynamics/energetics ===
In a controversial move, Odum and Richard Pinkerton (at the time physicist at the University of Florida) were motivated by Alfred J. Lotka's articles on the energetics of evolution, and subsequently proposed the theory that natural systems tend to operate at an efficiency that produces the maximum power output, not the maximum efficiency.

=== Energy Systems Language ===
By the end of the 1960s, Odum's electronic circuit ecological simulation models were replaced by a more general set of energy symbols. When combined to form systems diagrams, these symbols were considered by Odum and others to be the language of the macroscope which could portray generalized patterns of energy flow: "Describing such patterns and reducing ecosystem complexities to flows of energy, Odum believed, would permit discovery of general ecosystem principles." Some have attempted to link it with the universal scientific language projects which have appeared throughout the history of natural philosophy.

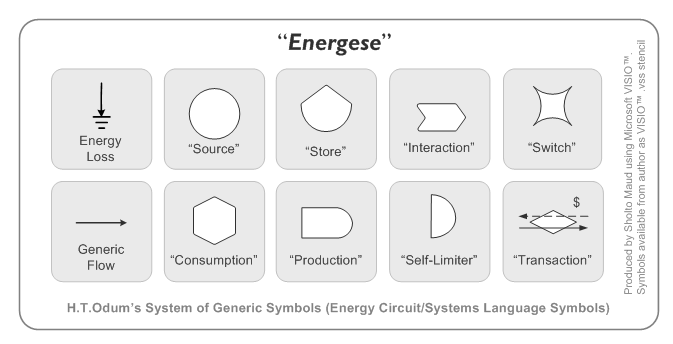
Energy Systems Language of systems ecology developed by Howard Odum and others, 1971.

Kitching claimed that the language was a direct result of working with analogue computers (i.e., an electrical circuit where the physical properties of the circuit elements simulate the physical properties of a dynamic system), and reflected an electrical engineer's approach to the problem of system representation: "Because of its electrical analogy, the Odum system is relatively easy to turn into mathematical equations ... If one is building a model of energy flow then certainly the Odum system should be given serious consideration... "

=== Emergy ===
In the 1990s in the latter part of his career, Odum and David M. Scienceman developed the idea of emergy as a specific use of the term embodied energy. Some consider the concept of "emergy", sometimes briefly defined as "energy memory", as one of Odum's more significant contributions, but the concept is neither free from controversy nor without its critics. Odum looked at natural systems as being formed by the use of various forms of energy in the past: "emergy is a measure of energy used in the past and thus is different from a measure of energy now. The unit of emergy (past available energy use) is the emjoule, as distinguished from joules used for available energy remaining now." This was conceived as a principle of maximum empower, which might explain the evolution of self-organising open systems. However, the principle has only been demonstrated in a few experiments and is not widely recognized in the scientific community.

== Ecosystem ecology and systems ecology ==
For J. B. Hagen, the maximum power principle, and the stability principle could be easily translated into the language of homeostasis and cybernetics systems. Hagen claims that the feedback loops in ecosystems were, for Odum, analogous to the kinds of feedback loops diagrammed in electronic circuits and cybernetic systems. This approach represented the migration of cybernetic ideas into ecology and led to the formulation of systems ecology. In Odum's work these concepts form part of what Hagen called an, "ambitious and idiosyncratic attempt to create a universal science of systems".

=== Macroscope ===
Hagen identified the systems, thinking of Odum as a form of holistic thinking, who contrasted the holistic thinking of systems science with reductionistic microscopic thinking, and used the term macroscope to refer to the holistic view, which was a kind of "detail eliminator" allowing a simple diagram to be created.

=== Microcosms ===
Odum was a pioneer in his use of small closed and open ecosystems in classroom teaching, which were often constructed from fish tanks or bottles and have been called microcosms. His microcosm studies influenced the design of Biosphere 2.

== Ecological economics ==
Ecological economics is an active field between economics and ecology with annual conferences, international societies, and an international journal. From 1956 to 1963, Odum worked as Director of the Marine Institute of the University of Texas. During this time Odum became aware of the interplay of ecological-energetic and economic forces. He therefore funded the research into the use of conventional economic approaches to quantify dollar values of ecological resources for recreational, treatment and other uses. This research calculated the potential value of primary production per bay surface area.

For Hall the importance of Odum's work came through his integration of systems, ecology, and energy with economics, together with Odum's view that economics can be evaluated on objective terms such as energy rather than on a subjective, willingness to pay basis.

== Ecological engineering ==
Ecological engineering is an emerging field of study between ecology and engineering concerned with the designing, monitoring and constructing of ecosystems. The term ecological engineering was first coined by Odum in 1962, before he worked at the University of Florida. Ecological engineering, he wrote, is "those cases where the energy supplied by man is small relative to the natural sources but sufficient to produce large effects in the resulting patterns and processes." Ecological engineering as a practical field was developed by his former graduate student Bill Mitsch, who started and continues to edit the standard journal in the field and helped to start both international and U.S. societies devoted to ecological engineering, and has written two textbooks on the subject One of Odum's last papers was his assessment of ecological engineering that was published in the journal Ecological Engineering in 2003, a year after Odum died.

== General systems theory ==
In 1991, Odum was elected the 30th president of the International Society for the Systems Sciences, formerly named the International Society for General Systems Research. He presented many papers on the general systems theory at its annual conferences, and edited the last published General Systems Yearbook. The second, revised edition of his major lifework was retitled Ecological and General Systems: An Introduction to Systems Ecology (1994). Some of his energy models and simulations contained general systems components. Odum has been described as a "technocratic optimist", and his approach was significantly influenced by his father, who was also an advocate of viewing the social world through the various lenses of physical science. Within the processes on earth, Odum (1989) believed humans play a central role: he said that the "human is the biosphere's programmatic and pragmatic information processor for maximum performance".

== Publications ==
Odum wrote around 15 books and 300 papers, and a Festschrift volume (Maximum Power: The Ideas and Applications of H. T. Odum, 1995) was published in honor of his work.

Odum was also honored by the journal Ecological Engineering for his contributions to the field of ecological engineering and general ecology in recognition of his 70th birthday. The publication included over 25 letters from distinguished scientists from all over the world including Mitsch (lead editorial), John Allen, Robert Ulanowitcz, Robert Beyers, Ariel Lugo, Marth Gilliland, Sandra Brown, Ramon Margalef, Paul Risser, Eugene Odum, Kathy Ewel, Kenneth Watt, Pat Kangas, Sven Jørgensen, Bob Knight, Rusong Wang, John Teal, Frank Golley, AnnMari and Bengt-Owe Jansson, Joan Browder, Carl Folke, Richard Wiegert, Scott Nixon, Gene Turner, John Todd, and James Zuchetto.

=== Books ===
- 2007, Environment, Power and Society for the Twenty-First Century: The Hierarchy of Energy, with Mark T. Brown, Columbia University Press.
- 2001, A Prosperous Way Down: Principles and Policies, with Elisabeth C. Odum, University Press of Colorado.
- 2000, with E. C. Odum, Modeling for all Scales: An introduction to System Simulation, Academic Press.
- 1999, Heavy Metals in the Environment: Using Wetlands for Their Removal.
- 1999, Biosphere 2 : Research, Past and Present, with Bruno D. V. Marino.
- 1996, Environmental Accounting: EMERGY and environmental decision making.
- 1993, Ecological Microcosms, with Robert J. Beyers.
- 1984, Cypress Swamps with Katherine C. Ewel.
- 1983, Systems Ecology : an Introduction.
- 1976, Energy Basis for Man and Nature, with Elisabeth C. Odum.
- 1970, with Robert F. Pigeon (eds), A Tropical Rain Forest; a Study of Irradiation and Ecology at El Verde, Puerto Rico, United States Atomic Energy Commission, National Technical information service.
- 1971, Environment, Power and Society, 1971
- 1967, (ed.) Work Circuits and System Stress, in Young, Symposium on Primary Productivity and Mineral Cycling, University of Maine Press.
- 1953, Fundamentals of Ecology, with Eugene P. Odum, (first edition).

=== Articles (selection) ===
- 1998, eMergy Evaluation Archived 2021-05-18 at the Wayback Machine, paper presented at the International Workshop on Advances in Energy Studies: Energy flows in ecology and economy, Porto Venere, Italy, May 27.
- 1997, EMERGY Evaluation and Transformity, in Kreith ed. CRC Handbook of Mechanical Engineering.
- 1992, Environmental Generalist, in Acta Cientifica.
- 1991, Emergy and Biogeochemical Cycles, in Rossi & Tiezzi ed Physical Chemistry.
- 1989, Emergy and Evolution, In 33rd Annual Meeting of the International Society for the Systems Sciences, UK.
- 1989, Comments and thanks to Students and Associates, Handout on the Occasion of the Celebration in Chapel Hill, N.C, in: "Advances in Understanding Ecological Systems", August 31-September 2.
- 1984, Embodied Energy and the Welfare of Nations, Jansson ed, Integration of Economy and Ecology.
- 1977, The ecosystem, energy, and human values, in: Zygon, Volume 12 Issue 2 Page 109–133.
- 1975, Energy Quality and Carrying Capacity of the Earth, response at prize awarding ceremony of Institute La Vie, Paris.
- 1973, Energy, ecology and economics, Royal Swedish Academy of Science. in: AMBIO, 2 (6), 220–227.
- 1963, with W. L. Slier, R. J. Beyers & N. Armstrong, Experiments with engineering of marine ecosystems, in: Publ. Inst. Marine Sci. Univ. Tex. 9:374-403.
- 1963, Limits of remote ecosystems containing man, in: The American Biology Teacher. 25 (6): 429–443.
- 1960a, Ecological potential and analog circuits for the ecosystem, in: Amer. Sci. 48:1-8.
- 1960b, Ten classroom sessions in ecology in: The American Biology Teacher. 22 (2): 71–78.
- 1958, with C. M. Hoskin, Comparative studies of the metabolism of Texas bays, in: Publ. Inst. March Sci., Univ. tex., 5:16-46.
- 1955, with E. P. Odum, Trophic structure and productivity of a windward coral reef community on Eniwetok Atoll, in: Ecological Monographs. 35, 291–320. JSTOR 1943285
- 1950, The Biogeochemistry of Strontium: With Discussion on the Ecological Integration of Elements, A dissertation presented to the Faculty of the Graduate School of Yale University in candidacy for the Degree of Doctor of Philosophy.
