= Cost of reproduction hypothesis =

In life history theory, the cost of reproduction hypothesis is the idea that reproduction is costly in terms of future survival and reproduction. This is mediated by various mechanisms, with the two most prominent being hormonal regulation and differential allocation of internal resources.

== Definition and predictions ==
The cost of reproduction hypothesis posits that reproduction (and increased reproductive effort) is costly in terms of future survival and reproduction. These costs may be exacerbated in certain organisms, such as first—time breeders. Along with the idea that organisms are selected to maximize lifetime reproductive success, this hypothesis results in a trade-off between current reproduction and future fitness that is pivotal in life history theory. This trade-off can be analyzed on three levels: the genetic (which analyzes the genetic basis of covariation between traits), the phenotypic (which assess how traits directly connected to fitness covary), and the intermediate level (which involves the analysis of the mechanisms connecting the genetic and phenotypic levels, like physiological mechanisms).

A major prediction of the cost of reproduction hypothesis is that the importance of the cost declines as an organism ages, resulting in increased reproductive effort in older organisms (this prediction is the terminal investment hypothesis). The cost of reproduction hypothesis also predicts that the optimal reproductive effort in a season is less than the effort that would maximize the number of offspring produced that season. This is especially true in organisms with a long lifespan, as their residual reproductive value (measured as the total reproductive value minus the current reproductive investment) would be higher compared to those with a shorter life.

== Trade-offs and causes ==
Costs of reproduction arise from multiple factors, including physiological, ecological, and behavioural factors. The two most prominent physiological factors are hormones and differential allocation of internal resources. Hormones influence the trade-off between current reproductive and future fitness through their multiple effects. For example, in Drosophila melanogaster, females with a mutation in the insulin receptor gene (DInR) released less ecdysteroids and produced less juvenile hormone; the reduction of the latter results in reduced egg production and a longer lifespan. In another insect, Gryllus firmus, short-winged females are more fecund at an early age and have elevated levels of ecdysteroids and juvenile hormones in their hemolymph (a fluid in invertebrates similar to blood), but are less able to disperse than their long-winged counterparts. This shows how hormones can mediate the cost of reproduction: by linking increased reproduction with decreased somatic function (decreased function in the rest of the body). Additionally, the amount of time the juvenile hormone titer (concentration) is above a certain level likely affects the cost of reproduction, as evidenced by the juvenile hormone titer's circadian rhythm in long-winged morphs and constant level in short-winged morphs.

The traditional view of the cost of reproduction says that a cost is caused by differential allocation of limited internal resources. This view is seen in the Y model of the cost of reproduction, where resources may be allocated to either reproduction or soma. Evidence for this can be seen in G. firmus, where short-winged females have as much as a 400% increase in ovarian growth and a 30% to 40% reduction in somatic triglyceride reserves (used for movement) compared to long-winged females. Short-winged females also divert less resources (in the form of fatty acids and amino acids) to synthesizing triglycerides and more resources to the production of ovarian proteins. Differential allocation of resources may be hormonally mediated; a juvenile hormone analog given to long-winged females reduced triglyceride synthesis and increased egg production, indicating how hormones and differential allocation of resources may work in tandem. Reduced immune function and a decreased defense against environment stress are also important factors in the cost of reproduction. The former has been especially well studied in male birds. Reduced immune function may take the form of increased susceptibility to diseases and parasites or a decreased immune response. This reduced function may be regulated by hormones; in Tenebrio molitor, for example, immunosuppression was caused by increased juvenile hormone as a result of mating. A decreased defense against environmental stress could operate through either somatic damage as a result of reproduction or a rerouting of the resources needed to protect against such damage.

Ecological factors, such as predation, also impact the cost of reproduction. Predation disproportionately affects breeding organisms because of multiple factors. These include increased exposure to predators due to mate searching, predators being attracted to conspicuous mating displays, and decreased mobility during copulation and pregnancy. Predation risk during reproduction can induce many evolutionary responses. In guppies, males in locations with high predation pressure generally are less colourful and perform courtship displays less frequently. When they do display, it is more often during darker periods of the day. Males also tend to rely more on non-visual copulation. Females in similar locations generally prefer less colourful males. They also dedicate more resources to offspring development, and the resulting young are smaller and more numerous. Coevolution may occur between the predators and their prey. Fireflies of the genus Photuris, for example, lure other fireflies through various means, including mimicking the female of the prey species. Some species may respond to this by emitting a nonsense signal that only predators would respond to.

== See also ==
- Life history theory
- Terminal investment hypothesis
