= Exergy efficiency =

Measure of performance of heat engines

In thermal engineering, exergy efficiency (also known as the second-law efficiency or rational efficiency) computes the effectiveness of a system relative to its performance in reversible conditions. It is defined as the ratio of the thermal efficiency of an actual system compared to an idealized or reversible version of the system for heat engines. It can also be described as the ratio of the useful work output of the system to the reversible work output for work-consuming systems. For refrigerators and heat pumps, it is the ratio of the actual coefficient of performance (COP) and reversible COP.

== Motivation ==
The reason the second-law efficiency is needed is because the first-law efficiencies fail to take into account an idealized version of the system for comparison. Using first-law efficiencies alone, can lead one to believe a system is more efficient than it is in reality. So, the second-law efficiencies are needed to gain a more realistic picture of a system's effectiveness. From the second law of thermodynamics it can be demonstrated that no system can ever be 100% efficient.

== Definition ==
The exergy B balance of a process gives:

$B_\text{in} = B_\text{out} + B_\text{lost} + B_\text{destroyed}$	1

with exergy efficiency defined as:

$\eta_B = \frac{B_\text{out}}{B_\text{in}} = 1 - \frac{\left(B_\text{lost} + B_\text{destroyed}\right)}{B_\text{in}}$	2

For many engineering systems this can be rephrased as:

$\eta_{B} = \frac{\dot{W}_\text{net}}{\dot{m}_\text{fuel} \Delta G^{0}_{T}}$	3

Where $\Delta G^{0}_{T}$ is the standard Gibbs (free) energy of reaction at temperature $T$ and pressure $p_{0} = 1 \, \mathrm{bar}$ (also known as the standard Gibbs function change), $\dot{W}_\text{net}$ is the net work output and $\dot{m}_\text{fuel}$ is the mass flow rate of fuel.

In the same way the energy efficiency can be defined as:

$\eta_{E} = \frac{\dot{W}_\text{net}}{\dot{m}_\text{fuel} \Delta H^{0}_{T}}$	4

Where $\Delta H^{0}_{T}$ is the standard enthalpy of reaction at temperature $T$ and pressure $p_{0} = 1 \, \mathrm{bar}$.

== Application ==
The destruction of exergy is closely related to the creation of entropy and as such any system containing highly irreversible processes will have a low energy efficiency. As an example the combustion process inside a power stations gas turbine is highly irreversible and approximately 25% of the exergy input will be destroyed here.

For fossil fuels the free enthalpy of reaction is usually only slightly less than the enthalpy of reaction so from equations (3) and (4) we can see that the energy efficiency will be correspondingly larger than the energy law efficiency. For example, a typical combined cycle power plant burning methane may have an energy efficiency of 55%, while its exergy efficiency will be 57%. A 100% exergy efficient methane fired power station would correspond to an energy efficiency of 98%.

This means that for many of the fuels we use, the maximum efficiency that can be achieved is >90%, however we are restricted to the Carnot efficiency in many situations as a heat engine is being used.

== Regarding Carnot heat engine ==
For any heat engine, the exergy efficiency compares a given cycle to a Carnot heat engine with the cold side temperature in equilibrium with the environment. Note that a Carnot engine is the most efficient heat engine possible, but not the most efficient device for creating work. Fuel cells, for instance, can theoretically reach much higher efficiencies than a Carnot engine; their energy source is not thermal energy and so their exergy efficiency does not compare them to a Carnot engine.

== Second law efficiency under maximum power ==
Neither the first nor the second law of thermodynamics includes a measure of the rate of energy transformation. When a measure of the maximal rate of energy transformation is included in the measure of second law efficiency it is known as second law efficiency under maximum power, and directly related to the maximum power principle (Gilliland 1978, p. 101).

== Challenges in Calculation ==
Applications that seek changes in flow streams, like species concentration, require more careful definitions of control volumes and desired end states. For example, for HVAC systems seeking to cool and dehumidify, it is reasonable to define their second law efficiencies for cooling and dehumidification by calculating exergy changes of all incoming and outgoing air and water streams, while assuming a target supply air temperature and humidity. In contrast, in thermal desalination for instance, the temperature of streams in real systems isn't important, so calculations should include control volumes that allow for outgoing brine and pure water streams to reach thermal equilibrium with their environment.

== See also ==
- Entropy production
- Energy
- Energy conversion efficiency
- Maximum power principle
