= Max Power =

Max Power may refer to:

- Max Power (magazine), a UK motoring magazine
- Max Power (footballer) (born 1993), English professional footballer
- A pseudonym taken by Homer Simpson in The Simpsons episode "Homer to the Max"

== See also ==
- Maximum power (disambiguation)
