= Life history theory =

Analytical framework to study life history strategies used by organisms

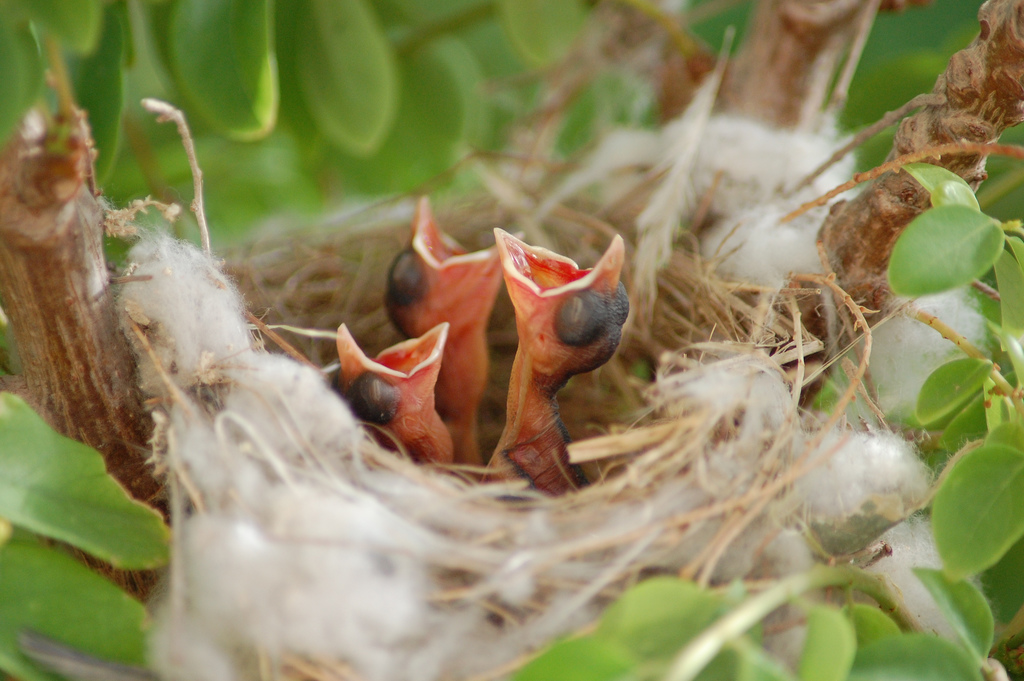
Newborn chicks starting their lives

Life history theory (LHT) is an analytical framework designed to study the diversity of life history strategies used by different organisms throughout the world, as well as the causes and results of the variation in their life cycles. It is a theory of biological evolution that seeks to explain aspects of organisms' anatomy and behavior by reference to the way that their life histories—including their reproductive development and behaviors, post-reproductive behaviors, and lifespan (length of time alive)—have been shaped by natural selection. A life history strategy is the "age- and stage-specific patterns" and timing of events that make up an organism's life, such as birth, weaning, maturation, death, etc. These events, notably juvenile development, age of sexual maturity, first reproduction, number of offspring and level of parental investment, senescence and death, depend on the physical and ecological environment of the organism.

The theory was developed in the 1950s and is used to answer questions about topics such as organism size, age of maturation, number of offspring, life span, and many others. In order to study these topics, life history strategies must be identified, and then models are constructed to study their effects. Finally, predictions about the importance and role of the strategies are made, and these predictions are used to understand how evolution affects the ordering and length of life history events in an organism's life, particularly the lifespan and period of reproduction. Life history theory draws on an evolutionary foundation, and studies the effects of natural selection on organisms, both throughout their lifetime and across generations. It also uses measures of evolutionary fitness to determine if organisms are able to maximize or optimize this fitness, by allocating resources to a range of different demands throughout the organism's life. It serves as a method to investigate further the "many layers of complexity of organisms and their worlds".

Organisms have evolved a great variety of life histories, from Pacific salmon, which produce thousands of eggs at one time and then die, to human beings, who produce a few offspring over the course of decades. The theory depends on principles of evolutionary biology and ecology and is widely used in other areas of science.

== Brief history of field ==
Life history theory is seen as a branch of evolutionary ecology and is used in a variety of different fields. Beginning in the 1950s, mathematical analysis became an important aspect of research regarding LHT. There are two main focuses that have developed over time: genetic and phenotypic, but there has been a recent movement towards combining these two approaches.

== Life cycle ==
All organisms follow a specific sequence in their development, beginning with gestation and ending with death, which is known as the life cycle. Events in between usually include birth, childhood, maturation, reproduction, and senescence, and together these comprise the life history strategy of that organism.

The major events in this life cycle are usually shaped by the demographic qualities of the organism. Some are more obvious shifts than others, and may be marked by physical changes—for example, teeth erupting in young children. Some events may have little variation between individuals in a species, such as length of gestation, but other events may show a lot of variation between individuals, such as age at first reproduction.

Life cycles can be divided into two major stages: growth and reproduction. These two cannot take place at the same time, so once reproduction has begun, growth usually ends. This shift is important because it can also affect other aspects of an organism's life, such as the organization of its group or its social interactions.

Each species has its own pattern and timing for these events, often known as its ontogeny, and the variety produced by this is what LHT studies. Evolution then works upon these stages to ensure that an organism adapts to its environment. For example, a human, between being born and reaching adulthood, will pass through an assortment of life stages, which include: birth, infancy, weaning, childhood and growth, adolescence, sexual maturation, and reproduction. All of these are defined in a specific biological way, which is not necessarily the same as the way that they are commonly used.

== Darwinian fitness ==
In the context of evolution, fitness is determined by how the organism is represented in the future. Genetically, a fit allele outcompetes its rivals over generations. Often, as a shorthand for natural selection, researchers only assess the number of descendants an organism produces over the course of its life. Then, the main elements are survivorship and reproductive rate. This means that the organism's traits and genes are carried on into the next generation, and are presumed to contribute to evolutionary "success". The process of adaptation contributes to this "success" by impacting rates of survival and reproduction, which in turn establishes an organism's level of Darwinian fitness. In life history theory, evolution works on the life stages of particular species (e.g., length of juvenile period) but is also discussed for a single organism's functional, lifetime adaptation. In both cases, researchers assume adaptation—processes that establish fitness.

== Traits ==
There are seven traits that are traditionally recognized as important in life history theory:

1. size at birth
2. growth pattern
3. age and size at maturity
4. number, size, and sex ratio of offspring
5. age- and size-specific reproductive investments
6. age- and size-specific mortality schedules
7. length of life

The trait that is seen as the most important for any given organism is the one where a change in that trait creates the most significant difference in that organism's level of fitness. In this sense, an organism's fitness is determined by its changing life history traits. The way in which evolutionary forces act on these life history traits serves to limit the genetic variability and heritability of the life history strategies, although there are still large varieties that exist in the world.

== Strategies ==
Combinations of these life history traits and life events create the life history strategies. As an example, Winemiller and Rose, as cited by Lartillot & Delsuc, propose three types of life history strategies in the fish they study: opportunistic, periodic, and equilibrium. These types of strategies are defined by the body size of the fish, age at maturation, high or low survivorship, and the type of environment they are found in. A fish with a large body size, a late age of maturation, and low survivorship, found in a seasonal environment, would be classified as having a periodic life strategy. The type of behaviors taking place during life events can also define life history strategies. For example, an exploitative life history strategy would be one where an organism benefits by using more resources than others, or by taking these resources from other organisms.

== Characteristics ==
Life history characteristics are traits that affect the life table of an organism, and can be imagined as various investments in growth, reproduction, and survivorship.

The goal of life history theory is to understand the variation in such life history strategies. This knowledge can be used to construct models to predict what kinds of traits will be favoured in different environments. Without constraints, the highest fitness would belong to a Darwinian demon, a hypothetical organism for whom such trade-offs do not exist. The key to life history theory is that there are limited resources available, and focusing on only a few life history characteristics is necessary.

Examples of some major life history characteristics include:

- Age at first reproductive event
- Reproductive lifespan and ageing
- Number and size of offspring

Variations in these characteristics reflect different allocations of an individual's resources (i.e., time, effort, and energy expenditure) to competing life functions. For any given individual, available resources in any particular environment are finite. Time, effort, and energy used for one purpose diminishes the time, effort, and energy available for another.

For example, birds with larger broods are unable to afford more prominent secondary sexual characteristics. Life history characteristics will, in some cases, change according to the population density, since genotypes with the highest fitness at high population densities will not have the highest fitness at low population densities. Other conditions, such as the stability of the environment, will lead to selection for certain life history traits. Experiments by Michael R. Rose and Brian Charlesworth showed that unstable environments select for flies with both shorter lifespans and higher fecundity—in unreliable conditions, it is better for an organism to breed early and abundantly than waste resources promoting its own survival.

Biological tradeoffs also appear to characterize the life histories of viruses, including bacteriophages.

=== Reproductive value and costs of reproduction ===
Reproductive value models the tradeoffs between reproduction, growth, and survivorship. An organism's reproductive value (RV) is defined as its expected contribution to the population through both current and future reproduction:

RV = Current Reproduction + Residual Reproductive Value (RRV)

The residual reproductive value represents an organism's future reproduction through its investment in growth and survivorship. The cost of reproduction hypothesis predicts that higher investment in current reproduction hinders growth and survivorship and reduces future reproduction, while investments in growth will pay off with higher fecundity (number of offspring produced) and reproductive episodes in the future. This cost-of-reproduction tradeoff influences major life history characteristics. For example, a 2009 study by J. Creighton, N. Heflin, and M. Belk on burying beetles provided "unconfounded support" for the costs of reproduction. The study found that beetles that had allocated too many resources to current reproduction also had the shortest lifespans. In their lifetimes, they also had the fewest reproductive events and offspring, reflecting how over-investment in current reproduction lowers residual reproductive value.

The related terminal investment hypothesis describes a shift to current reproduction with higher age. At early ages, RRV is typically high, and organisms should invest in growth to increase reproduction at a later age. As organisms age, this investment in growth gradually increases current reproduction. However, when an organism grows old and begins losing physiological function, mortality increases while fecundity decreases. This senescence shifts the reproduction tradeoff towards current reproduction: the effects of aging and higher risk of death make current reproduction more favorable. The burying beetle study also supported the terminal investment hypothesis: the authors found beetles that bred later in life also had increased brood sizes, reflecting greater investment in those reproductive events.

=== r/K selection theory ===
The selection pressures that determine the reproductive strategy, and therefore much of the life history, of an organism can be understood in terms of r/K selection theory. The central trade-off to life history theory is the number of offspring vs. the timing of reproduction. Organisms that are r-selected have a high growth rate (r) and tend to produce a high number of offspring with minimal parental care; their lifespans also tend to be shorter. r-selected organisms are suited to life in an unstable environment, because they reproduce early and abundantly and allow for a low survival rate of offspring. K-selected organisms subsist near the carrying capacity of their environment (K), produce a relatively low number of offspring over a longer span of time, and have high parental investment. They are more suited to life in a stable environment in which they can rely on a long lifespan and a low mortality rate that will allow them to reproduce multiple times with a high offspring survival rate.

Some organisms that are very r-selected are semelparous, only reproducing once before they die. Semelparous organisms may be short-lived, like annual crops. However, some semelparous organisms are relatively long-lived, such as the African flowering plant Lobelia telekii which spends up to several decades growing an inflorescence that blooms only once before the plant dies, or the periodical cicada which spends 17 years as a larva before emerging as an adult. Organisms with longer lifespans are usually iteroparous, reproducing more than once in a lifetime. However, iteroparous organisms can be more r-selected than K-selected, such as a sparrow, which gives birth to several chicks per year but lives only a few years, as compared to a wandering albatross, which first reproduces at ten years old and breeds every other year during its 40-year lifespan.

r-selected organisms usually:

- mature rapidly and have an early age of first reproduction
- have a relatively short lifespan
- have a large number of offspring at a time, and few reproductive events, or are semelparous
- have a high mortality rate and a low offspring survival rate
- have minimal parental care/investment

K-selected organisms usually:

- mature more slowly and have a later age of first reproduction
- have a longer lifespan
- have few offspring at a time and more reproductive events spread out over a longer span of time
- have a low mortality rate and a high offspring survival rate
- have high parental investment

=== Variation ===
Variation is a major part of what LHT studies, because every organism has its own life history strategy. Differences between strategies can be minimal or great. For example, one organism may have a single offspring while another may have hundreds. Some species may live for only a few hours, and some may live for decades. Some may reproduce dozens of times throughout their lifespan, and others may only reproduce one or twice.

=== Trade-offs ===
An essential component of studying life history strategies is identifying the trade-offs that take place for any given organism. Energy use in life history strategies is regulated by thermodynamics and the conservation of energy, and the "inherent scarcity of resources", so not all traits or tasks can be invested in at the same time. Thus, organisms must choose between tasks, such as growth, reproduction, and survival, prioritizing some and not others. For example, there is a trade-off between maximizing body size and maximizing lifespan, and between maximizing offspring size and maximizing offspring number. This is also sometimes seen as a choice between quantity and quality of offspring. These choices are the trade-offs that life history theory studies.

One significant trade off is between somatic effort (towards growth and maintenance of the body) and reproductive effort (towards producing offspring). Since an organism cannot put energy towards doing these simultaneously, many organisms have a period where energy is put just toward growth, followed by a period where energy is focused on reproduction, creating a separation of the two in the life cycle. Thus, the end of the period of growth marks the beginning of the period of reproduction. Another fundamental trade-off associated with reproduction is between mating effort and parenting effort. If an organism is focused on raising its offspring, it cannot devote that energy to pursuing a mate.

An important trade-off in the dedication of resources to breeding has to do with predation risk: organisms that have to deal with an increased risk of predation often invest less in breeding. This is because it is not worth as much to invest a lot in breeding when the benefit of such investment is uncertain.

These trade-offs, once identified, can then be put into models that estimate their effects on different life history strategies and answer questions about the selection pressures that exist on different life events. Over time, there has been a shift in how these models are constructed. Instead of focusing on one trait and looking at how it changed, scientists are looking at these trade-offs as part of a larger system, with complex inputs and outcomes.

=== Constraints ===
The idea of constraints is closely linked to the idea of trade-offs discussed above. Because organisms have a finite amount of energy, the process of trade-offs acts as a natural limit on the organism's adaptations and potential for fitness. This occurs in populations as well. These limits can be physical, developmental, or historical, and they are imposed by the existing traits of the organism. Different environments impose different constraints; for example, laying amniotic eggs is impossible in water, obligating fully aquatic amniotes to be viviparous or retain the ability to lay eggs on land.

=== Optimal life-history strategies ===
Populations can adapt and thereby achieve an "optimal" life history strategy that allows the highest level of fitness possible (fitness maximization). There are several methods from which to approach the study of optimality, including energetic and demographic. Achieving optimal fitness also encompasses multiple generations, because the optimal use of energy includes both the parents and the offspring. For example, "optimal investment in offspring is where the decrease in total number of offspring is equaled by the increase of the number who survive".

Optimality is important for the study of life history theory because it serves as the basis for many of the models used, which work from the assumption that natural selection, as it works on life history traits, is moving towards the most optimal group of traits and use of energy. This base assumption, that over the course of its life span an organism is aiming for optimal energy use, then allows scientists to test other predictions. However, actually gaining this optimal life history strategy cannot be guaranteed for any organism.

=== Allocation of resources ===
An organism's allocation of resources ties into several other important concepts, such as trade-offs and optimality. The best possible allocation of resources is what allows an organism to achieve an optimal life history strategy and obtain the maximum level of fitness, and making the best possible choices about how to allocate energy to various trade-offs contributes to this. Models of resource allocation have been developed and used to study problems such as parental involvement, the length of the learning period for children, and other developmental issues. The allocation of resources also plays a role in variation, because the different resource allocations by different species create the variety of life history strategies.

=== Capital and income breeding ===
The division of capital and income breeding focuses on how organisms use resources to finance breeding, and how they time it. In capital breeders, resources collected before breeding are used to pay for it, and they breed once they reach a body-condition threshold, which decreases as the season progresses. Income breeders, on the other hand, breed using resources that are generated concurrently with breeding, and time that using the rate of change in body-condition relative to multiple fixed thresholds. This distinction, though, is not necessarily a dichotomy; instead, it is a spectrum, with pure capital breeding lying on one end, and pure income breeding on the other.

Capital breeding is more often seen in organisms that deal with strong seasonality. This is because when offspring value is low, yet food is abundant, building stores to breed from allows these organisms to achieve higher rates of reproduction than they otherwise would have. In less seasonal environments, income breeding is likely to be favoured because waiting to breed would not have fitness benefits.

=== Phenotypic plasticity ===
Phenotypic plasticity focuses on the concept that the same genotype can produce different phenotypes in response to different environments. It affects the levels of genetic variability by serving as a source of variation and integration of fitness traits.

== Determinants ==
Many factors can determine the evolution of an organism's life history, especially the unpredictability of the environment. A very unpredictable environment—one in which resources, hazards, and competitors may fluctuate rapidly—selects for organisms that produce more offspring earlier in their lives, because it is never certain whether they will survive to reproduce again. Mortality rate may be the best indicator of a species' life history: organisms with high mortality rates—the usual result of an unpredictable environment—typically mature earlier than those species with low mortality rates, and give birth to more offspring at a time. A highly unpredictable environment can also lead to plasticity, in which individual organisms can shift along the spectrum of r-selected vs. K-selected life histories to suit the environment.

== Human life history ==
In studying humans, life history theory is used in many ways, including in biology, psychology, economics, anthropology, and other fields. For humans, life history strategies include all the usual factors—trade-offs, constraints, reproductive effort, etc.—but also includes a culture factor that allows them to solve problems through cultural means in addition to through adaptation. Humans also have unique traits that make them stand out from other organisms, such as a large brain, later maturity and age of first reproduction, and a relatively long lifespan, often supported by fathers and older (post-menopausal) relatives. There are a variety of possible explanations for these unique traits. For example, a long juvenile period may have been adapted to support a period of learning the skills needed for successful hunting and foraging. This period of learning may also explain the longer lifespan, as a longer amount of time over which to use those skills makes the period needed to acquire them worth it. Cooperative breeding and the grandmothering hypothesis have been proposed as the reasons that humans continue to live for many years after they are no longer capable of reproducing. The large brain allows for a greater learning capacity, and the ability to engage in new behaviors and create new things. The change in brain size may have been the result of a dietary shift—towards higher quality and difficult to obtain food sources—or may have been driven by the social requirements of group living, which promoted sharing and provisioning. Recent authors, such as Kaplan, argue that both aspects are probably important. Research has also indicated that humans may pursue different reproductive strategies. In investigating life history frameworks for explaining reproductive strategy development, empirical studies have identified issues with a psychometric approach, but tentatively supported predicted links between early stress, accelerated puberty, insecure attachment, unrestricted sociosexuality and relationship dissatisfaction.

== Tools used ==
- mathematical modeling
- quantitative genetics
- artificial selection
- demography
- optimality modeling
- mechanistic approach
- Malthusian parameter

== Perspectives ==
Life history theory has provided new perspectives in understanding many aspects of human reproductive behavior, such as the relationship between poverty and fertility. A number of statistical predictions have been confirmed by social data and there is a large body of scientific literature from studies in experimental animal models, and naturalistic studies among many organisms.

== Criticism ==
The claim that long periods of helplessness in young would select for more parenting effort in protecting the young at the same time as high levels of predation would select for less parenting effort is criticized for assuming that absolute chronology would determine direction of selection. This criticism argues that the total amount of predation threat faced by the young has the same effective protection need effect no matter if it comes in the form of a long childhood and far between the natural enemies or a short childhood and closely spaced natural enemies, as different life speeds are subjectively the same thing for the animals and only outwardly looks different. One cited example is that small animals that have more natural enemies would face approximately the same number of threats and need approximately the same amount of protection (at the relative timescale of the animals) as large animals with fewer natural enemies that grow more slowly (e.g. that many small carnivores that could not eat even a very young human child could easily eat multiple very young blind meerkats). This criticism also argues that when a carnivore eats a batch stored together, there is no significant difference in the chance of one surviving depending on the number of young stored together, concluding that humans do not stand out from many small animals such as mice in selection for protecting helpless young.

There is criticism of the claim that menopause and somewhat earlier age-related declines in female fertility could co-evolve with a long term dependency on monogamous male providers who preferred fertile females. This criticism argues that the longer the time the child needed parental investment relative to the lifespans of the species, the higher the percentage of children born would still need parental care when the female was no longer fertile or dramatically reduced in her fertility. These critics argue that unless male preference for fertile females and ability to switch to a new female was annulled, any need for a male provider would have selected against menopause to use her fertility to keep the provider male attracted to her, and that the theory of monogamous fathers providing for their families therefore cannot explain why menopause evolved in humans.

One criticism of the notion of a trade-off between mating effort and parenting effort is that in a species in which it is common to spend much effort on something other than mating, including but not exclusive to parenting, there is less energy and time available for such for the competitors as well, meaning that species-wide reductions in the effort spent at mating does not reduce the ability of an individual to attract other mates. These critics also criticize the dichotomy between parenting effort and mating effort for missing the existence of other efforts that take time from mating, such as survival effort which would have the same species-wide effects.

There are also criticisms of size and organ trade-offs, including criticism of the claim of a trade-off between body size and longevity that cites the observation of longer lifespans in larger species, as well as criticism of the claim that big brains promoted sociality citing primate studies in which monkeys with large portions of their brains surgically removed remained socially functioning though their technical problem solving deteriorated in flexibility, computer simulations of chimpanzee social interaction showing that it requires no complex cognition, and cases of socially functioning humans with microcephalic brain sizes.

== See also ==
- Age determination in herbaceous plants
- Age determination in woody plants
- Behavioral ecology
- Biological life cycle
- Evolutionarily Stable Strategy
- Dynamic energy budget theory for metabolic organisation
- Evolutionary developmental psychology
- Evolutionary history of life
- Evolutionary physiology
- Human behavioral ecology
- Paternal care
- Plant strategies
- Generation time
