= Maximum power principle =

Tendency of self-developing systems to maximize energy intake and efficiency

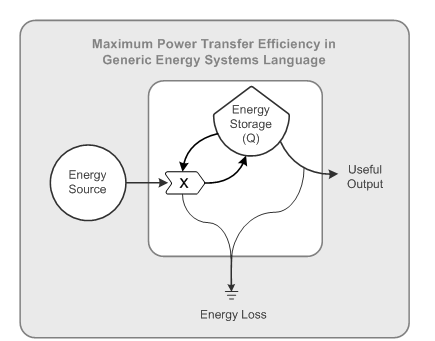
Maximum Power Principle in Energy Systems Language adapted from Odum and Odum 2000, p. 38

The maximum power principle or Lotka's principle has been proposed as the fourth principle of energetics in open system thermodynamics, where an example of an open system is a biological cell. According to Howard T. Odum, "The maximum power principle can be stated: During self-organization, system designs develop and prevail that maximize power intake, energy transformation, and those uses that reinforce production and efficiency."

== History ==
Chen (2006) has located the origin of the statement of maximum power as a formal principle in a tentative proposal by Alfred J. Lotka (1922a, b). Lotka's statement sought to explain the Darwinian notion of evolution with reference to a physical principle. Lotka's work was subsequently developed by the systems ecologist Howard T. Odum in collaboration with the chemical engineer Richard C. Pinkerton, and later advanced by the engineer Myron Tribus.

While Lotka's work may have been a first attempt to formalise evolutionary thought in mathematical terms, it followed similar observations made by Leibniz and Volterra and Ludwig Boltzmann, for example, throughout the sometimes controversial history of natural philosophy. In contemporary literature it is most commonly associated with the work of Howard T. Odum.

The significance of Odum's approach was given greater support during the 1970s, amid times of oil crisis, where, as Gilliland (1978, pp. 100) observed, there was an emerging need for a new method of analysing the importance and value of energy resources to economic and environmental production. A field known as energy analysis, itself associated with net energy and EROEI, arose to fulfill this analytic need. However, in energy analysis intractable theoretical and practical difficulties arose when using the energy unit to understand, a) the conversion among concentrated fuel types (or energy types), b) the contribution of labour, and c) the contribution of the environment.

== Philosophy and theory ==
Lotka said (1922b: 151):

The principle of natural selection reveals itself as capable of yielding information which the first and second laws of thermodynamics are not competent to furnish. The two fundamental laws of thermodynamics are, of course, insufficient to determine the course of events in a physical system. They tell us that certain things cannot happen, but they do not tell us what does happen.

Gilliland noted that these difficulties in analysis in turn required some new theory to adequately explain the interactions and transactions of these different energies (different concentrations of fuels, labour and environmental forces). Gilliland (Gilliland 1978, p. 101) suggested that Odum's statement of the maximum power principle (H.T.Odum 1978, pp. 54–87) was, perhaps, an adequate expression of the requisite theory:

That theory, as it is expressed by the maximum power principle, addresses the empirical question of why systems of any type or size organize themselves into the patterns observed. Such a question assumes that physical laws govern system function. It does not assume, for example, that the system comprising economic production is driven by consumers; rather that the whole cycle of production-consumption is structured and driven by physical laws.

This theory Odum called maximum power theory. In order to formulate maximum power theory Gilliland observed that Odum had added another law (the maximum power principle) to the already well established laws of thermodynamics. In 1978 Gilliland wrote that Odum's new law had not yet been validated (Gilliland 1978, p. 101). Gilliland stated that in maximum power theory the second law efficiency of thermodynamics required an additional physical concept: "the concept of second law efficiency under maximum power" (Gilliland 1978, p. 101):

Neither the first or second law of thermodynamics include a measure of the rate at which energy transformations or processes occur. The concept of maximum power incorporates time into measures of energy transformations. It provides information about the rate at which one kind of energy is transformed into another as well as the efficiency of that transformation.

In this way the concept of maximum power was being used as a principle to quantitatively describe the selective law of biological evolution. Perhaps H.T.Odum's most concise statement of this view was (1970, p. 62):

Lotka provided the theory of natural selection as a maximum power organizer; under competitive conditions systems are selected which use their energies in various structural-developing actions so as to maximize their use of available energies. By this theory systems of cycles which drain less energy lose out in comparative development. However Leopold and Langbein have shown that streams in developing erosion profiles, meander systems, and tributary networks disperse their potential energies more slowly than if their channels were more direct. These two statements might be harmonized by an optimum efficiency maximum power principle (Odum and Pinkerton 1955), which indicates that energies which are converted too rapidly into heat are not made available to the systems own use because they are not fed back through storages into useful pumping, but instead do random stirring of the environment.

The Odum–Pinkerton approach to Lotka's proposal was to apply Ohm's law – and the associated maximum power theorem (a result in electrical power systems) – to ecological systems. Odum and Pinkerton defined "power" in electronic terms as the rate of work, where Work is understood as a "useful energy transformation". The concept of maximum power can therefore be defined as the maximum rate of useful energy transformation. Hence the underlying philosophy aims to unify the theories and associated laws of electronic and thermodynamic systems with biological systems. This approach presupposed an analogical view which sees the world as an ecological-electronic-economic engine.

== Proposals for maximum power principle as 4th thermodynamic law ==
It has been pointed out by Boltzmann that the fundamental object of contention in the life-struggle, in the evolution of the organic world, is available energy. In accord with this observation is the principle that, in the struggle for existence, the advantage must go to those organisms whose energy-capturing devices are most efficient in directing available energy into channels favorable to the preservation of the species.

— A.J. Lotka 1922a, p. 147

...it seems to this author appropriate to unite the biological and physical traditions by giving the Darwinian principle of natural selection the citation as the fourth law of thermodynamics, since it is the controlling principle in rate of heat generation and efficiency settings in irreversible biological processes.

— H.T. Odum 1963, p. 437

...it may be time to recognize the maximum power principle as the fourth thermodynamic law as suggested by Lotka.

— H.T. Odum 1994

== Definition in words ==
The maximum power principle can be stated: During self-organization, system designs develop and prevail that maximize power intake, energy transformation, and those uses that reinforce production and efficiency. (H.T. Odum 1995, p. 311)

...the maximum power principle ... states that systems which maximize their flow of energy survive in competition. In other words, rather than merely accepting the fact that more energy per unit of time is transformed in a process which operates at maximum power, this principle says that systems organize and structure themselves naturally to maximize power. Systems regulate themselves according to the maximum power principle. Over time, the systems which maximize power are selected for whereas those that do not are selected against and eventually eliminated. ... Odum argues ... that the free market mechanisms of the economy effectively do the same thing for human systems and that our economic evolution to date is a product of that selection process. (Gilliland 1978, pp. 101–102)

Odum et al. viewed the maximum power theorem as a principle of power-efficiency reciprocity selection with wider application than just electronics. For example, Odum saw it in open systems operating on solar energy, like both photovoltaics and photosynthesis (1963, p. 438). Like the maximum power theorem, Odum's statement of the maximum power principle relies on the notion of 'matching', such that high-quality energy maximizes power by matching and amplifying energy (1994, pp. 262, 541): "in surviving designs a matching of high-quality energy with larger amounts of low-quality energy is likely to occur" (1994, p. 260). As with electronic circuits, the resultant rate of energy transformation will be at a maximum at an intermediate power efficiency. In 2006, T.T. Cai, C.L. Montague and J.S. Davis said that, "The maximum power principle is a potential guide to understanding the patterns and processes of ecosystem development and sustainability. The principle predicts the selective persistence of ecosystem designs that capture a previously untapped energy source." (2006, p. 317). In several texts H.T. Odum gave the Atwood machine as a practical example of the 'principle' of maximum power.

=== Mathematical definition ===
The mathematical definition given by H.T. Odum is formally analogous to the definition provided on the maximum power theorem article. (For a brief explanation of Odum's approach to the relationship between ecology and electronics see Ecological Analog of Ohm's Law)

== Contemporary ideas ==
Whether or not the principle of maximum power efficiency can be considered the fourth law of thermodynamics and the fourth principle of energetics is moot. Nevertheless, H.T. Odum also proposed a corollary of maximum power as the organisational principle of evolution, describing the evolution of microbiological systems, economic systems, planetary systems, and astrophysical systems. He called this corollary the maximum empower principle. This was suggested because, as S.E. Jorgensen, M.T. Brown, H.T. Odum (2004) note,

Maximum power might be misunderstood to mean giving priority to low level processes. ... However, the higher level transformation processes are just as important as the low level processes. ... Therefore, Lotka's principle is clarified by stating it as the principle of self organization for maximum empower.

— p. 18

C. Giannantoni may have confused matters when he wrote "The "Maximum Em-Power Principle" (Lotka–Odum) is generally considered the "Fourth Thermodynamic Principle" (mainly) because of its practical validity for a very wide class of physical and biological systems" (C. Giannantoni 2002, § 13, p. 155). Nevertheless, Giannantoni has proposed the Maximum Em-Power Principle as the fourth principle of thermodynamics (Giannantoni 2006).

The preceding discussion is incomplete. The "maximum power" was discovered several times independently, in physics and engineering, see: Novikov (1957), El-Wakil (1962), and Curzon and Ahlborn (1975). The incorrectness of this analysis and design evolution conclusions was demonstrated by Gyftopoulos (2002).

== See also ==
- Maximum power theorem
- Maximum entropy thermodynamics
- Entropy production
- Exergy efficiency
- Energy conversion efficiency
- Energy rate density
- Exergy
- Jeremy England
- Free energy
- Emergy
- Systems ecology
- Ecological economics
