= Microcosm (experimental ecosystem) =

Microcosms are artificial, simplified ecosystems that are used to simulate and predict the behaviour of natural ecosystems under controlled conditions. Open or closed microcosms provide an experimental area for ecologists to study natural ecological processes. Microcosm studies can be very useful to study the effects of disturbance or to determine the ecological role of key species. A Winogradsky column is an example of a microbial microcosm.

== See also ==
- Closed ecological system
- Ecologist Howard T. Odum was a pioneer in his use of small closed and open ecosystems in classroom teaching.
- Biosphere 2 - Controversial project with a 1.27 ha artificial closed ecological system in Oracle, Arizona (USA).
