= Reproductive value (population genetics) =

Concept in demography and population genetics

Reproductive value is a concept in demography and population genetics that represents the discounted number of future female children that will be born to a female of a specific age. Ronald Fisher first defined reproductive value in his 1930 book The Genetical Theory of Natural Selection where he proposed that future offspring be discounted at the rate of growth of the population; this implies that sexually reproductive value measures the contribution of an individual of a given age to the future growth of the population.

== Definition ==
Consider a species with a life history table with survival and reproductive parameters given by $\ell_x$ and $m_x$, where

$\ell_x$ = probability of surviving from age 0 to age $x$

and

$m_x$ = average number of offspring produced by an individual of age $x.$

In a population with a discrete set of age classes, Fisher's reproductive value is calculated as

$$v_x = \sum_{y=x}^{\infty} \lambda^{-(y-x+1)} \frac{\ell_{y}}{\ell_{x}} m_{y}$$

where $\lambda$ is the stable population growth rate. When age classes are continuous,

$$v(x) = \int_{x}^{\infty} e^{-r(y-x)} \frac{\ell(y)}{\ell(x)} m(y) dy$$

where $r$ is the intrinsic rate of increase or Malthusian growth rate.

== See also ==
- Population dynamics
- Euler–Lotka equation
- Leslie matrix
- Senescence

== Notes ==
- Fisher, R. A. 1930. The Genetical Theory of Natural Selection. Oxford University Press, Oxford.
- Keyfitz, N. and Caswell, H. 2005. Applied Mathematical Demography. Springer, New York. 3rd edition. doi:10.1007/b139042
