= Leslie matrix =

Age-structured model of population growth

The Leslie matrix is a discrete, age-structured model of population growth named after Patrick H. Leslie and used in population ecology. The Leslie matrix (also called the Leslie model) is one of the most well-known ways to describe the growth of populations (and their projected age distribution), in which a population is closed to migration, growing in an unlimited environment, and where only one sex, usually the female, is considered.

The Leslie matrix is used in ecology to model the changes in a population of organisms over a period of time. In a Leslie model, the population is divided into groups based on age classes. A similar model which replaces age classes with ontogenetic stages is called a Lefkovitch matrix, whereby individuals can both remain in the same stage class or move on to the next one. At each time step, the population is represented by a vector with an element for each age class where each element indicates the number of individuals currently in that class.

The Leslie matrix is a square matrix with the same number of rows and columns as the population vector has elements. The (i,j)th cell in the matrix indicates how many individuals will be in the age class i at the next time step for each individual in stage j. At each time step, the population vector is multiplied by the Leslie matrix to generate the population vector for the subsequent time step.

To build a matrix, the following information must be known from the population:

- $n_x$, the count of individuals (n) of each age class x
- $s_x$, the fraction of individuals that survives from age class x to age class x+1,
- $f_x$, fecundity, the per capita average number of female offspring reaching $n_0$ born from mother of the age class x. More precisely, it can be viewed as the number of offspring produced at the next age class $b_{x+ 1}$ weighted by the probability of reaching the next age class. Therefore, $f_x = s_xb_{x+1}.$

From the observations that $n_0$ at time t+1 is simply the sum of all offspring born from the previous time step and that the organisms surviving to time t+1 are the organisms at time t surviving at probability $s_x$, one gets $n_{x+1} = s_xn_x$. This implies the following matrix representation:

$$\begin{bmatrix}
n_0 \\
n_1 \\
\vdots \\
n_{\omega - 1} \\
\end{bmatrix}_{t+1}
=
\begin{bmatrix}
f_0 & f_1 & f_2 & \ldots & f_{\omega  - 2} & f_{\omega  - 1} \\
s_0 & 0 & 0 & \ldots & 0 & 0\\
0 & s_1 & 0 & \ldots & 0 & 0\\
0 & 0 & s_2 & \ldots & 0 & 0\\
\vdots & \vdots & \vdots & \ddots & \vdots & \vdots\\
0 & 0 & 0 & \ldots & s_{\omega - 2}  & 0
\end{bmatrix}
\begin{bmatrix}
n_0 \\ n_1 \\ \vdots\\ n_{\omega - 1}
\end{bmatrix}_{t}$$

where $\omega$ is the maximum age attainable in the population.

This can be written as:

$$\mathbf{n}_{t+1} = \mathbf{L}\mathbf{n}_t$$

or:

$$\mathbf{n}_{t} = \mathbf{L}^t\mathbf{n}_0$$

where $\mathbf{n}_t$ is the population vector at time t and $\mathbf{L}$ is the Leslie matrix. The dominant eigenvalue of $\mathbf{L}$, denoted $\lambda$, gives the population's asymptotic growth rate (growth rate at the stable age distribution). The corresponding eigenvector provides the stable age distribution, the proportion of individuals of each age within the population, which remains constant at this point of asymptotic growth barring changes to vital rates. Once the stable age distribution has been reached, a population undergoes exponential growth at rate $\lambda$.

The characteristic polynomial of the matrix is given by the Euler–Lotka equation.

The Leslie model is very similar to a discrete-time Markov chain. The main difference is that in a Markov model, one would have $f_x+s_x=1$ for each $x$, while the Leslie model may have these sums greater or less than 1.

== Stable age structure ==
This age-structured growth model suggests a steady-state, or stable, age-structure and growth rate. Regardless of the initial population size, $N_0$, or age distribution, the population tends asymptotically to this age-structure and growth rate. It also returns to this state following perturbation. The Euler–Lotka equation provides a means of identifying the intrinsic growth rate. The stable age-structure is determined both by the growth rate and the survival function (i.e. the Leslie matrix). For example, a population with a large intrinsic growth rate will have a disproportionately “young” age-structure. A population with high mortality rates at all ages (i.e. low survival) will have a similar age-structure.

== Random Leslie model ==
There is a generalization of the population growth rate to when a Leslie matrix has random elements which may be correlated. When characterizing the disorder, or uncertainties, in vital parameters; a perturbative formalism has to be used to deal with linear non-negative random matrix difference equations. Then the non-trivial, effective eigenvalue which defines the long-term asymptotic dynamics of the mean-value population state vector can be presented as the effective growth rate. This eigenvalue and the associated mean-value invariant state vector can be calculated from the smallest positive root of a secular polynomial and the residue of the mean-valued Green function. Exact and perturbative results can thusly be analyzed for several models of disorder.
