= Euler–Lotka equation =

Equation used in demography

In the study of age-structured population growth, probably one of the most important equations is the Euler–Lotka equation. Based on the age demographic of females in the population and female births (since in many cases it is the females that are more limited in the ability to reproduce), this equation allows for an estimation of how a population is growing.

The field of mathematical demography was largely developed by Alfred J. Lotka in the early 20th century, building on the earlier work of Leonhard Euler. The Euler–Lotka equation, derived and discussed below, is often attributed to either of its origins: Euler, who derived a special form in 1760, or Lotka, who derived a more general continuous version. The equation in discrete time is given by

$$1 = \sum_{a = 1}^\omega \lambda^{-a}\ell(a)b(a)$$

where $\lambda$ is the discrete growth rate, ℓ(a) is the fraction of individuals surviving to age a and b(a) is the number of offspring born to an individual of age a during the time step. The sum is taken over the entire life span of the organism.

== Derivations ==
=== Lotka's continuous model ===
A.J. Lotka in 1911 developed a continuous model of population dynamics as follows. This model tracks only the females in the population.

Let B(t)dt be the number of births during the time interval from t to t+dt. Also define the survival function ℓ(a), the fraction of individuals surviving to age a. Finally define b(a) to be the birth rate for mothers of age a. The product B(t-a)ℓ(a) therefore denotes the number density of individuals born at t-a and still alive at t, while B(t-a)ℓ(a)b(a) denotes the number of births in this cohort, which suggest the following Volterra integral equation for B:

$$B(t) = \int_0^t B(t - a )\ell(a)b(a) \, da.$$

We integrate over all possible ages to find the total rate of births at time t. We are in effect finding the contributions of all individuals of age up to t. We need not consider individuals born before the start of this analysis since we can just set the base point low enough to incorporate all of them.

Let us then guess an exponential solution of the form B(t) = Qe^{rt}. Plugging this into the integral equation gives:

$$Qe^{rt} = \int_0^t Q e^{r(t - a)}\ell(a)b(a) \, da$$

or

$$1 = \int_0^t e^{-ra}\ell(a)b(a) \, da.$$

This can be rewritten in the discrete case by turning the integral into a sum producing

$$1 = \sum_{a = \alpha}^\beta e^{-ra}\ell(a)b(a)$$

letting $\alpha$ and $\beta$ be the boundary ages for reproduction or defining the discrete growth rate λ = e^{r} we obtain the discrete time equation derived above:

$$1 = \sum_{a = 1}^\omega \lambda^{-a}\ell(a)b(a)$$

where $\omega$ is the maximum age, we can extend these ages since b(a) vanishes beyond the boundaries.

=== From the Leslie matrix ===
Let us write the Leslie matrix as:

$$\begin{bmatrix}
f_0 & f_1 & f_2 & f_3 & \ldots &f_{\omega  - 1} \\
s_0 & 0 & 0 & 0 & \ldots & 0\\
0 & s_1 & 0 & 0 & \ldots & 0\\
0 & 0 & s_2 & 0 & \ldots & 0\\
0 & 0 & 0 & \ddots & \ldots & 0\\
0 & 0 & 0 & \ldots & s_{\omega - 2}  & 0
\end{bmatrix}$$

where $s_i$ and $f_i$ are survival to the next age class and per capita fecundity respectively. Note that $s_i = \ell_{i + 1}/\ell_i$ where ℓ_{i} is the probability of surviving to age $i$, and $f_i = s_ib_{i + 1}$, the number of births at age $i + 1$ weighted by the probability of surviving to age $i+1$.

Now if we have stable growth the growth of the system is an eigenvalue of the matrix since $\mathbf{n_{i+ 1}} = \mathbf{Ln_i} = \lambda \mathbf{n_i}$. Therefore, we can use this relationship row by row to derive expressions for $n_i$ in terms of the values in the matrix and $\lambda$.

Introducing notation $n_{i, t}$ the population in age class $i$ at time $t$, we have $n_{1, t+1} = \lambda n_{1, t}$. However also $n_{1, t+1} = s_0n_{0, t}$. This implies that

$$n_{1, t} = \frac{s_0}{\lambda}n_{0, t}. \,$$

By the same argument we find that

$$n_{2, t} = \frac{s_1}{\lambda}n_{1, t} = \frac{s_0s_1}{\lambda^2}n_{0, t}.$$

Continuing inductively we conclude that generally

$$n_{i, t} = \frac{s_0\cdots s_{i - 1}}{\lambda^i}n_{0, t}.$$

Considering the top row, we get

$$n_{0, t+ 1} = f_0n_{0, t} + \cdots + f_{\omega- 1}n_{\omega - 1, t} = \lambda n_{0, t}.$$

Now we may substitute our previous work for the $n_{i, t}$ terms and obtain:

$$\lambda n_{0, t} = \left(f_0 + f_1\frac{s_0}{\lambda} + \cdots + f_{\omega - 1}\frac{s_0\cdots s_{\omega - 2}}{\lambda^{\omega - 1}}\right)n_{(0, t)}.$$

First substitute the definition of the per-capita fertility and divide through by the left hand side:

$$1 =  \frac{s_0b_1}{\lambda} + \frac{s_0s_1b_2}{\lambda^2} + \cdots + \frac{s_0\cdots s_{\omega - 1}b_{\omega}}{\lambda^{\omega}}.$$

Now we note the following simplification. Since $s_i = \ell_{i + 1}/\ell_i$ we note that

$$s_0\ldots s_i = \frac{\ell_1}{\ell_0}\frac{\ell_2}{\ell_1}\cdots\frac{\ell_{i + 1}}{\ell_i} = \ell_{i + 1}.$$

This sum collapses to:

$$\sum_{i = 1}^\omega \frac{\ell_ib_i}{\lambda^i} = 1,$$

which is the desired result.

== Analysis of expression ==
From the above analysis we see that the Euler–Lotka equation is in fact the characteristic polynomial of the Leslie matrix. We can analyze its solutions to find information about the eigenvalues of the Leslie matrix (which has implications for the stability of populations).

Considering the continuous expression f as a function of r, we can examine its roots. We notice that at negative infinity the function grows to positive infinity and at positive infinity the function approaches 0.

The first derivative is clearly −af and the second derivative is a^{2}f. This function is then decreasing, concave up and takes on all positive values. It is also continuous by construction so by the intermediate value theorem, it crosses r = 1 exactly once. Therefore, there is exactly one real solution, which is therefore the dominant eigenvalue of the matrix the equilibrium growth rate.

This same derivation applies to the discrete case.

== Relationship to replacement rate of populations ==
If we let λ = 1 the discrete formula becomes the replacement rate of the population.

== Relationship to reproduction numbers in epidemiology ==
In infectious disease epidemiology, the growth rate r in the exponential solution can be related to the reproduction number using the generation time distribution.

== See also ==
- List of topics named after Leonhard Euler
