= Alfred J. Lotka =

American mathematician (1880–1949)

- Born: 2 March 1880; Lwów, Austria-Hungary (now Lviv, Ukraine)
- Died: 5 December 1949 (aged 69); Red Bank, New Jersey, U.S.
- Known for: Lotka–Volterra equations, Maximum power principle
- Scientific career
- Fields: Mathematics

Alfred James Lotka (March 2, 1880 – December 5, 1949) was a Polish-American mathematician, physical chemist, and statistician, famous for his work in population dynamics and energetics. A biophysicist, Lotka is best known for his proposal of the predator–prey model, developed simultaneously but independently of Vito Volterra. The Lotka–Volterra model is still the basis of many models used in the analysis of population dynamics in ecology.

== Life ==
Lotka was born in Lwów, Austria-Hungary (now Lviv, Ukraine) to Polish-American parents. His parents, Jacques and Marie (Doebely) Lotka, were US nationals. He gained his B.Sc. in 1901 at the University of Birmingham, England, he did graduate work in 1901–02 at Leipzig University, received an M.A. in 1909 at Cornell University and a D.Sc. at Birmingham University in 1912.

Occupations

- Assistant chemist for General Chemical Company (1902–1908, 1914–1919)
- Patent examiner for US Patent Office (1909)
- Assistant physicist for National Bureau of Standards (1909–1911)
- Editor of the Scientific American Supplement (1911–1914)
- Staff member at Johns Hopkins University (1922–1924)
- Statistician for the Metropolitan Life Insurance Company, New York City (1924 until his retirement in 1948)

In 1935, he married Romola Beattie. They had no children.

He died in Red Bank, New Jersey.

== Work ==
The Lotka–Volterra equations predict linked oscillations in populations of predator and prey.

Although he is today known mainly for the Lotka–Volterra equations used in ecology, Lotka was a bio-mathematician and a bio-statistician, who sought to apply the principles of the physical sciences to biological sciences as well. His main interest was demography, which possibly influenced his professional choice as a statistician at Metropolitan Life Insurance.

One of Lotka's earliest publications, in 1912, proposed a solution to Ronald Ross's second malaria model. In 1923, he published a thorough five-part analysis and extension of both Ross's malaria models. The fourth part in the series, co-authored by F. R. Sharpe, modeled the time lag for pathogen incubation. Lotka published Elements of Physical Biology in 1925, one of the first books on mathematical biology after D'Arcy Thompson's On Growth and Form. He is also known for his energetics perspective on evolution. Lotka proposed that natural selection was, at its root, a struggle among organisms for available energy; Lotka's principle states that organisms that survive and prosper are those that capture and use energy more efficiently than their competitors. Lotka extended his energetics framework to human society. In particular, he suggested that the shift in reliance from solar energy to nonrenewable energy would pose unique and fundamental challenges to society. These theories made Lotka an important forerunner to the development of biophysical economics and ecological economics, advanced by Frederick Soddy, Howard Odum and others.

=== Elements of physical biology ===
While at Johns Hopkins, Lotka completed his book Elements of Physical Biology (1925), in which he extended the work of Pierre François Verhulst. His first book summarizes his previous work and organizes his ideas of unity and universality of physical laws, making his works accessible to other scientists. Although the book covered a large number of topics, from energetics of evolution (see below) to the physical nature of consciousness, the author is primarily known today for the Lotka–Volterra equation of population dynamics.

=== Energetics of evolution ===
His earlier work was centered on energetics and applications of thermodynamics in life sciences.

Lotka proposed the theory that the Darwinian concept of natural selection could be quantified as a physical law. The law that he proposed was that the selective principle of evolution was one which favoured the maximum useful energy flow transformation. The general systems ecologist Howard T. Odum later applied Lotka's proposal as a central guiding feature of his work in ecosystem ecology. Odum called Lotka's law the maximum power principle.

=== Demography and public health ===
Lotka's work in mathematical demography began in 1907 with the publication of articles in the journal Science and American Journal of Science. He published several dozen articles on the subject over more than two decades, culminating with Théorie Analytique des Associations Biologiques (Analytical Theory of Biological Associations). The 45-page Part 1, titled Principes, was published in 1934; the 149-page Part 2, titled Analyse demographique avec application particuliere a l'espece humaine, was published in 1939; both by Hermann & Cie, Paris.

=== Bibliometrics ===
Within the field of bibliometrics, particularly that part devoted to studying scientific publications, Lotka is noted for contributing "Lotka's law". The law, which Lotka discovered, relates to the productivity of scientists. As noted by W. G. Poitier in 1981: "The Lotka distribution is based on an inverse square law where the number of authors writing n papers is 1/n^{2} of the number of authors writing one paper. Each subject area can have associated with it an exponent representing its specific rate of author productivity." Lotka's work sparked additional inquiries, eventually seminally contributing to the field of scientometrics—the scientific study of scientific publications.

He teamed up with Louis Israel Dublin, another statistician at Metropolitan Life, to write three books on demography and public health: The Money Value of a Man (1930), Length of Life (1936), and Twenty-five Years of Health Progress (1937).

== Honors ==
- President of the Population Association of America (1938–1939)
- President of the American Statistical Association (1942)
- Vice president of the Union for the Scientific Investigation of Population Problems
- Chairman of the United States National Committee of the Union
- Fellow of American Public Health Association
- Fellow of Institute of Mathematical Statistics

== See also ==
- Lotka–Volterra equations (for predation)
- Lotka–Volterra inter-specific competition equations
- Lotka's law (a special case of Zipf's law)
- Lotka's principle
- Euler–Lotka equation
- Sharpe–Lotka–McKendrick's equation
- Energy accounting
- Biophysical economics
- Bioeconomics
- Energy economics
- Howard T. Odum

== Publications ==
- Lotka, A. J. (1925) "Elements of Physical Biology" reprinted by Dover in 1956 as Elements of Mathematical Biology.
- Lotka, A. J. (1939) Théorie Analytique des Associations Biologiques translated in 1998 as Analytical Theory of Biological Populations. New York: Plenum Press.
- Lotka, A. J. (1989). Lotka on population study, ecology, and evolution. Population and Development Review, 15(3), 539–550.
- Lotka, A. J. (1998). Analytical theory of biological populations. New York: Plenum Press

Articles, a selection

- Lotka, A. J. (1907). Relation between birth rates and death rates. Science, 26: 121–130.
- Sharpe, F. R. & Lotka, A. J. (1911). A problem in age distribution. Philosophical Magazine, 21: 435–438.
- Lotka, A. J. (1912) Quantitative studies in epidemiology. Nature, 88: 497–498.
- Lotka, A. J. (1919). A contribution to quantitive epidemiology. Journal of the Washington Academy of Sciences, 9: p. 73.
- Lotka, A. J. (1922a) "Contribution to the energetics of evolution". Proc Natl Acad Sci USA, 8: pp. 147–51.
- Lotka, A. J. (1922b) "Natural selection as a physical principle". Proc Natl Acad Sci USA, 8, pp. 151–54.
- Lotka, A. J. (1923) "Contribution to the analysis of malaria epidemiology". The American Journal of Hygiene, 3: 1–121.
- Lotka, A. J. (1926) "The Frequency Distribution of Scientific Productivity". Journal of the Washington Academy of Sciences 16(1926):317–323.

About Lotka

- Haaga, J. (2000). "Alfred Lotka, mathematical demographer ". Population Today, 28(2), 3.
- Kingsland, S. E. (1985). Modeling nature: episodes in the history of population ecology. Chicago: University of Chicago.
