= Systems ecology =

Holistic approach to the study of ecological systems

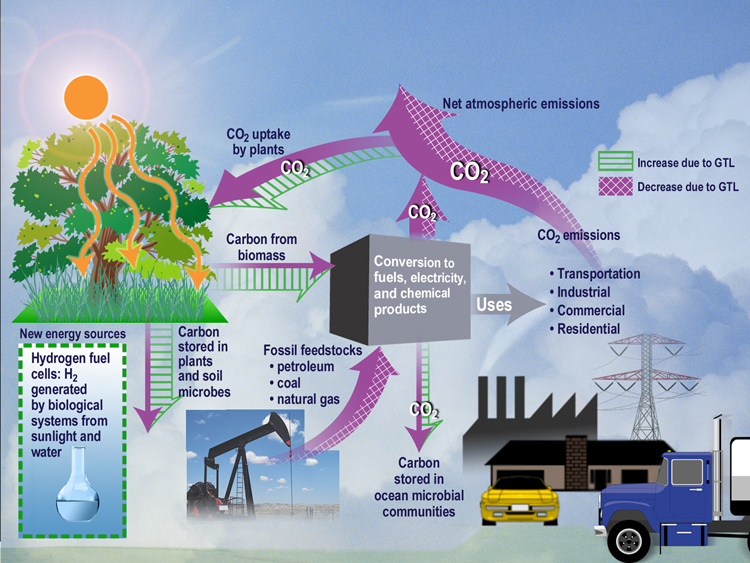
Ecological analysis of CO_{2} in an ecosystem

Systems ecology is an interdisciplinary field of ecology, a subset of Earth system science, that takes a holistic approach to the study of ecological systems, especially ecosystems. Systems ecology can be seen as an application of general systems theory to ecology. Central to the systems ecology approach is the idea that an ecosystem is a complex system exhibiting emergent properties. Systems ecology focuses on interactions and transactions within and between biological and ecological systems, and is especially concerned with the way the functioning of ecosystems can be influenced by human interventions. It uses and extends concepts from thermodynamics and develops other macroscopic descriptions of complex systems.

== Overview ==
Systems ecology seeks a holistic view of the interactions and transactions within and between biological and ecological systems. Systems ecologists realise that the function of any ecosystem can be influenced by human economics in fundamental ways. They have therefore taken an additional transdisciplinary step by including economics in the consideration of ecological-economic systems. In the words of R.L. Kitching:

- Systems ecology can be defined as the approach to the study of ecology of organisms using the techniques and philosophy of systems analysis: that is, the methods and tools developed, largely in engineering, for studying, characterizing and making predictions about complex entities, that is, systems.
- In any study of an ecological system, an essential early procedure is to draw a diagram of the system of interest ... diagrams indicate the system's boundaries by a solid line. Within these boundaries, series of components are isolated which have been chosen to represent that portion of the world in which the systems analyst is interested ... If there are no connections across the systems' boundaries with the surrounding systems environments, the systems are described as closed. Ecological work, however, deals almost exclusively with open systems.

As a mode of scientific enquiry, a central feature of Systems Ecology is the general application of the principles of energetics to all systems at any scale. Perhaps the most notable proponent of this view was Howard T. Odum - sometimes considered the father of ecosystems ecology. In this approach the principles of energetics constitute ecosystem principles. Reasoning by formal analogy from one system to another enables the Systems Ecologist to see principles functioning in an analogous manner across system-scale boundaries. H.T. Odum commonly used the Energy Systems Language as a tool for making systems diagrams and flow charts.

The fourth of these principles, the principle of maximum power efficiency, takes central place in the analysis and synthesis of ecological systems. The fourth principle suggests that the most evolutionarily advantageous system function occurs when the environmental load matches the internal resistance of the system. The further the environmental load is from matching the internal resistance, the further the system is away from its sustainable steady state. Therefore, the systems ecologist engages in a task of resistance and impedance matching in ecological engineering, just as the electronic engineer would do.

== Closely related fields ==
=== Earth systems engineering and management ===
Earth systems engineering and management (ESEM) is a discipline used to analyze, design, engineer and manage complex environmental systems. It entails a wide range of subject areas including anthropology, engineering, environmental science, ethics and philosophy. At its core, ESEM looks to "rationally design and manage coupled human-natural systems in a highly integrated and ethical fashion."

=== Ecological economics ===
Ecological economics is a transdisciplinary field of academic research that addresses the dynamic and spatial interdependence between human economies and natural ecosystems. Ecological economics brings together and connects different disciplines, within the natural and social sciences but especially between these broad areas. As the name suggests, the field is made up of researchers with a background in economics and ecology. An important motivation for the emergence of ecological economics has been criticism on the assumptions and approaches of traditional (mainstream) environmental and resource economics.

=== Ecological energetics ===
Ecological energetics is the quantitative study of the flow of energy through ecological systems. It aims to uncover the principles which describe the propensity of such energy flows through the trophic, or 'energy availing' levels of ecological networks. In systems ecology the principles of ecosystem energy flows or "ecosystem laws" (i.e. principles of ecological energetics) are considered formally analogous to the principles of energetics.

=== Ecological humanities ===
Ecological humanities aims to bridge the divides between the sciences and the humanities, and between Western, Eastern and Indigenous ways of knowing nature. Like ecocentric political theory, the ecological humanities are characterised by a connectivity ontology and a commitment to two fundamental axioms relating to the need to submit to ecological laws and to see humanity as part of a larger living system.

=== Ecosystem ecology ===
A riparian forest in the White Mountains, New Hampshire (USA)

Ecosystem ecology is the integrated study of biotic and abiotic components of ecosystems and their interactions within an ecosystem framework. This science examines how ecosystems work and relates this to their components such as chemicals, bedrock, soil, plants, and animals. Ecosystem ecology examines physical and biological structure and examines how these ecosystem characteristics interact.

The relationship between systems ecology and ecosystem ecology is complex. Much of systems ecology can be considered a subset of ecosystem ecology. Ecosystem ecology also utilizes methods that have little to do with the holistic approach of systems ecology. However, systems ecology more actively considers external influences such as economics that usually fall outside the bounds of ecosystem ecology. Whereas ecosystem ecology can be defined as the scientific study of ecosystems, systems ecology is more of a particular approach to the study of ecological systems and phenomena that interact with these systems.

=== Industrial ecology ===
Industrial ecology is the study of industrial processes as linear (open loop) systems, in which resource and capital investments move through the system to become waste, to a closed loop system where wastes become inputs for new processes.

== See also ==
- Agroecology
- Earth system science
- Ecosystem ecology
- Ecological literacy
- Emergy
- Energy flow (ecology)
- Energy Systems Language
- Holism in science
- Holon (philosophy)
- Holistic management
- Landscape ecology
- Antireductionism
- Biosemiotics
- Ecosemiotics
- MuSIASEM

== Bibliography ==
- Gregory Bateson, Steps to an Ecology of Mind, 2000.
- Kenneth Edmund Ferguson, Systems Analysis in Ecology, WATT, 1966, 276 pp.
- Efraim Halfon, Theoretical Systems Ecology: Advances and Case Studies, Academic Press, 1979.
- J. W. Haefner, Modeling Biological Systems: Principles and Applications, London., UK, Chapman and Hall 1996, 473 pp.
- Richard F Johnston, Peter W Frank, Charles Duncan Michener, Annual Review of Ecology and Systematics, 1976, 307 pp.
- Jorgensen, Sven E., "Introduction to Systems Ecology", CRC Press, 2012.
- R.L. Kitching, Systems ecology, University of Queensland Press, 1983.
- Howard T. Odum, Systems Ecology: An Introduction, Wiley-Interscience, 1983.
- Howard T. Odum, Ecological and General Systems: An Introduction to Systems Ecology. University Press of Colorado, Niwot, CO, 1994.
- Friedrich Recknagel, Applied Systems Ecology: Approach and Case Studies in Aquatic Ecology, 1989.
- James. Sanderson & Larry D. Harris, Landscape Ecology: A Top-down Approach, 2000, 246 pp.
- Sheldon Smith, Human Systems Ecology: Studies in the Integration of Political Economy, 1989.
- Shugart, H.H., O’Neil, R.V. (Eds.) Systems Ecology, Dowden, Hutchinson & Ross, Inc., 1979.
- Van Dyne, George M., Ecosystems, Systems Ecology, and Systems Ecologists, ORNL- 3975. Oak Ridge National Laboratory, Oak Ridge, TN, pp. 1–40, 1966.
- Patten, Bernard C. (editor), "Systems Analysis and Simulation in Ecology", Volume 1, Academic Press, 1971.
- Patten, Bernard C. (editor), "Systems Analysis and Simulation in Ecology", Volume 2, Academic Press, 1972.
- Patten, Bernard C. (editor), "Systems Analysis and Simulation in Ecology", Volume 3, Academic Press, 1975.
- Patten, Bernard C. (editor), "Systems Analysis and Simulation in Ecology", Volume 4, Academic Press, 1976.
