= Energy systems language =

Modeling language used in energy flow diagrams

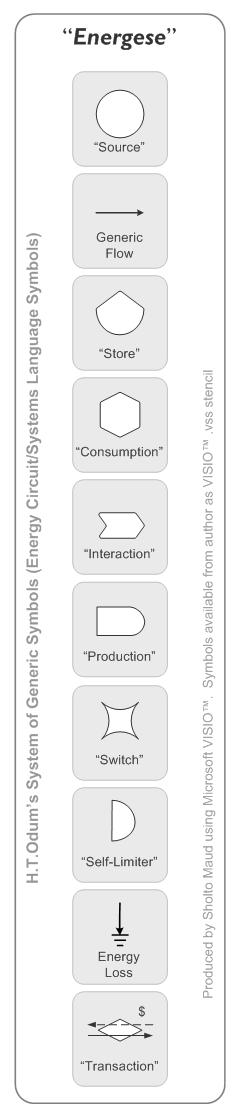
The energy systems language of systems ecology

The energy systems language, also referred to as energese, or energy circuit language, or generic systems symbols, is a modelling language used for composing energy flow diagrams in the field of systems ecology. It was developed by Howard T. Odum and colleagues in the 1950s during studies of the tropical forests funded by the United States Atomic Energy Commission.

== Design intent ==
The design intent of the energy systems language was to facilitate the generic depiction of energy flows through any scale system while encompassing the laws of physics, and in particular, the laws of thermodynamics (see energy transformation for an example).

In particular, H.T. Odum aimed to produce a language which could facilitate the intellectual analysis, engineering synthesis and management of global systems such as the geobiosphere and its many subsystems. Within this aim, H.T. Odum had a strong concern that many abstract mathematical models of such systems were not thermodynamically valid. Hence he used analog computers to make system models due to their intrinsic value; that is, the electronic circuits are of value for modelling natural systems which are assumed to obey the laws of energy flow, because, in themselves, the circuits, like natural systems, also obey the known laws of energy flow, where the energy form is electrical. However, Odum was interested not only in the electronic circuits themselves but also in how they might be used as formal analogies for modeling other systems which also had energy flowing through them. As a result, Odum did not restrict his inquiry to the analysis and synthesis of any one system in isolation. The discipline that is most often associated with this kind of approach, together with the use of the energy systems language is known as systems ecology.

== General characteristics ==
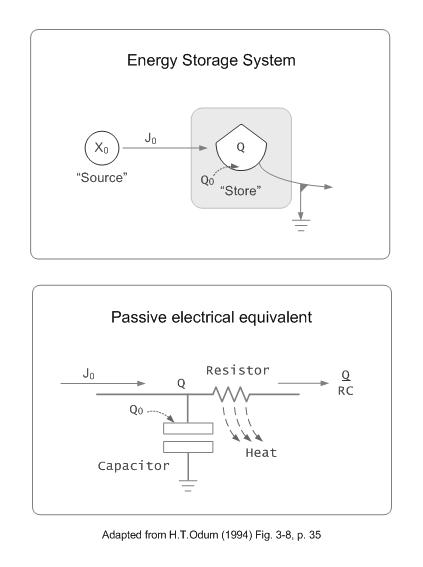
Passive electrical equivalent of Energy Systems Language storage icon

When applying the electronic circuits (and schematics) to modeling ecological and economic systems, Odum believed that generic categories, or characteristic modules, could be derived. Moreover, he felt that a general symbolic system, fully defined in electronic terms (including the mathematics thereof) would be useful for depicting real system characteristics, such as the general categories of production, storage, flow, transformation, and consumption. Central principles of electronics also therefore became central features of the energy systems language – Odum's generic symbolism.

Depicted to the left is the generic symbol for storage, which Odum named the Bertalanffy module, in honor of the general systems theorist Ludwig von Bertalanffy.

For Odum, in order to achieve a holistic understanding of how many apparently different systems actually affect each other, it was important to have a generic language with a massively scalable modeling capacity – to model global-to-local, ecological, physical and economic systems. The intention was, and for those who still apply it, is, to make biological, physical, ecological, economic and other system models thermodynamically, and so also energetically, valid and verifiable. As a consequence the designers of the language also aimed to include the energy metabolism of any system within the scope of inquiry.

== Pictographic icons ==
In order to aid learning, in Modeling for all Scales Odum and Odum (2000) suggested systems might first be introduced with pictographic icons, and then later defined in the generic symbolism. Pictograms have therefore been used in software programs like ExtendSim to depict the basic categories of the Energy Systems Language. Some have argued that such an approach shares similar motivations to Otto Neurath's isotype project, Leibniz's (Characteristica Universalis) Enlightenment Project and Buckminster Fuller's works.

== See also ==
- Characteristica universalis
- Embodied energy
- Emergy
- Energy flow (ecology)
- SysML
- Unified modeling language
- Universal language
