= Energy flow (ecology) =

Flow of energy through food chains in ecological energetics

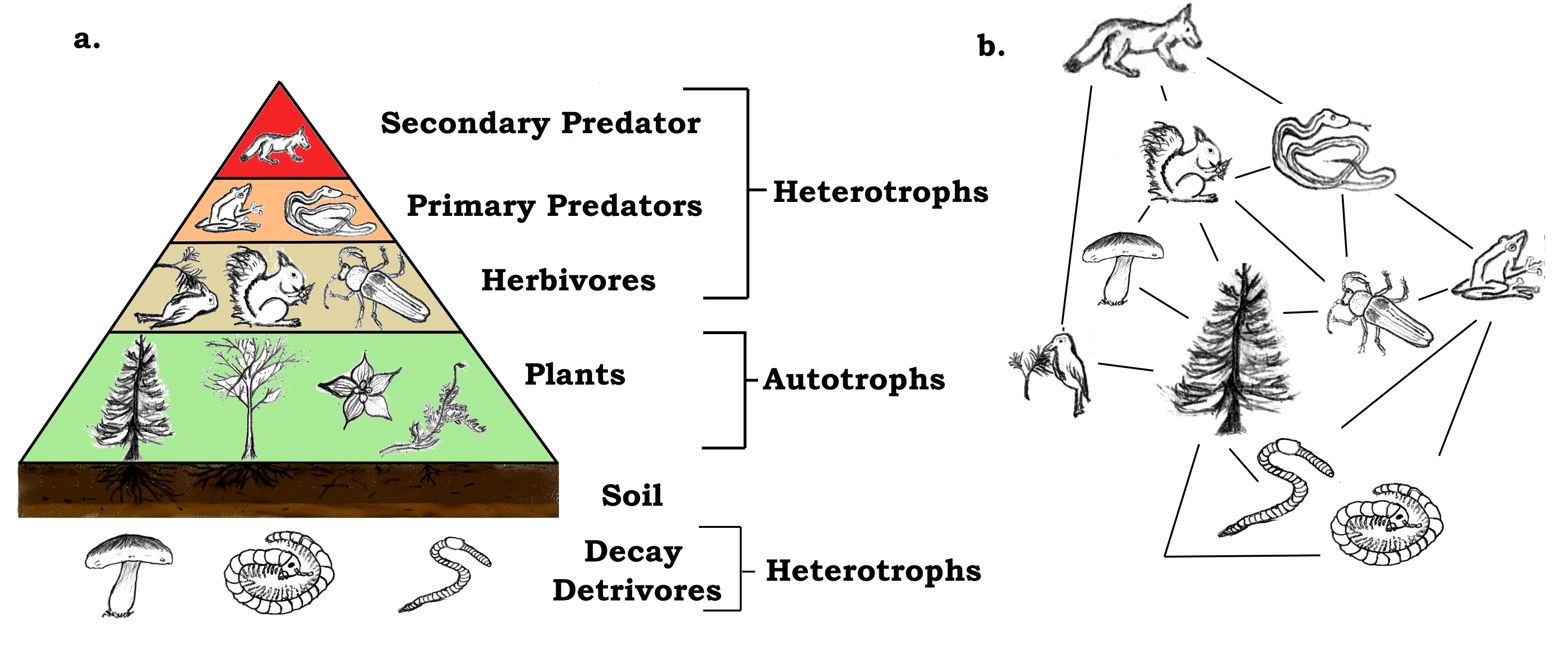
A food pyramid and a corresponding food web, demonstrating some of the simpler patterns in a food web

A graphic representation of energy transfer between trophic layers in an ecosystem

Energy flow is the flow of energy through living things within an ecosystem. All living organisms can be organized into producers and consumers, and those producers and consumers can further be organized into a food chain. Each of the levels within the food chain is a trophic level. In order to more efficiently show the quantity of organisms at each trophic level, these food chains are then organized into trophic pyramids. The arrows in the food chain show that the energy flow is unidirectional, with the head of an arrow indicating the direction of energy flow; energy is lost as heat at each step along the way.

The unidirectional flow of energy and the successive loss of energy as it travels up the food web are patterns in energy flow that are governed by thermodynamics, which is the theory of energy exchange between systems. Trophic dynamics relates to thermodynamics because it deals with the transfer and transformation of energy (originating externally from the sun via solar radiation) to and among organisms.

== Energetics and the carbon cycle ==
The carbon cycle of a terrestrial ecosystem. Beginning with photosynthesis, water (blue) and carbon dioxide (white) from the air are taken in with solar energy (yellow), and are converted into plant energy (green). "100×10^{15} grams of carbon/year fixed by photosynthetic organisms, which is equivalent to 4×10^{18} kJ/yr = 4×10^{21} J/yr of free energy." Cellular respiration is the reverse reaction, wherein energy of plants is taken in and carbon dioxide and water are given off. The carbon dioxide and water produced can be recycled back into plants.

The first step in energetics is photosynthesis, where in water and carbon dioxide from the air are taken in with energy from the sun, and are converted into oxygen and glucose. Cellular respiration is the reverse reaction, wherein oxygen and sugar are taken in and release energy as they are converted back into carbon dioxide and water. The carbon dioxide and water produced by respiration can be recycled back into plants.

Energy loss can be measured either by efficiency (how much energy makes it to the next level), or by biomass (how much living material exists at those levels at one point in time, measured by standing crop). Of all the net primary productivity at the producer trophic level, in general only 10% goes to the next level, the primary consumers, then only 10% of that 10% goes on to the next trophic level, and so on up the food pyramid. Ecological efficiency may be anywhere from 5% to 20% depending on how efficient or inefficient that ecosystem is. This decrease in efficiency occurs because organisms need to perform cellular respiration to survive, and energy is lost as heat when cellular respiration is performed. That is also why there are fewer tertiary consumers than there are producers.

== Primary production ==
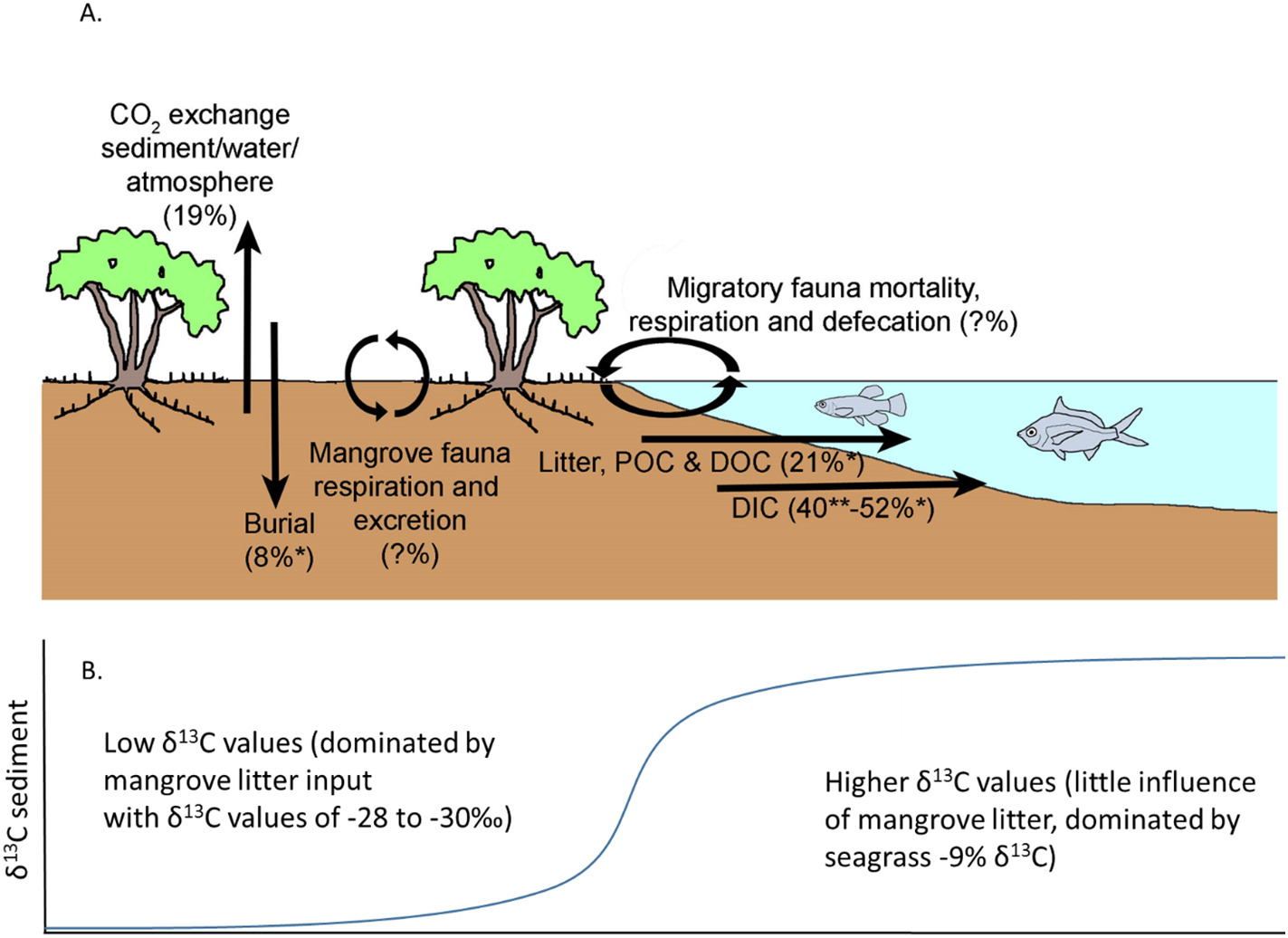
Fate of mangrove primary production

A producer is any organism that performs photosynthesis. Producers are important because they convert energy from the sun into a storable and usable chemical form of energy, glucose, as well as oxygen. The producers themselves can use the energy stored in glucose to perform cellular respiration. Or, if the producer is consumed by herbivores in the next trophic level, some of the energy is passed on up the pyramid. The glucose stored within producers serves as food for consumers, and so it is only through producers that consumers are able to access the sun's energy. Some examples of primary producers are algae, mosses, and other plants such as grasses, trees, and shrubs.

Chemosynthetic bacteria perform a process similar to photosynthesis, but instead of energy from the sun they use energy stored in chemicals like hydrogen sulfide. This process, referred to as chemosynthesis, usually occurs deep in the ocean at hydrothermal vents that produce heat and chemicals such as hydrogen, hydrogen sulfide and methane. Chemosynthetic bacteria can use the energy in the bonds of the hydrogen sulfide and oxygen to convert carbon dioxide to glucose, releasing water and sulfur in the process. Organisms that consume the chemosynthetic bacteria can take in the glucose and use oxygen to perform cellular respiration, similar to herbivores consuming producers.

One of the factors that controls primary production is the amount of energy that enters the producer(s), which can be measured using productivity. Only one percent of solar energy enters the producer, the rest bounces off or moves through. Gross primary productivity is the amount of energy the producer actually gets. Generally, 60% of the energy that enters the producer goes to the producer's own respiration. The net primary productivity is the amount that the plant retains after the amount that it used for cellular respiration is subtracted. Another factor controlling primary production is organic/inorganic nutrient levels in the water or soil that the producer is living in. An example of the nutrients that can impact the efficiency of primary plant production are nitrogen (N) and phosphorus (P).

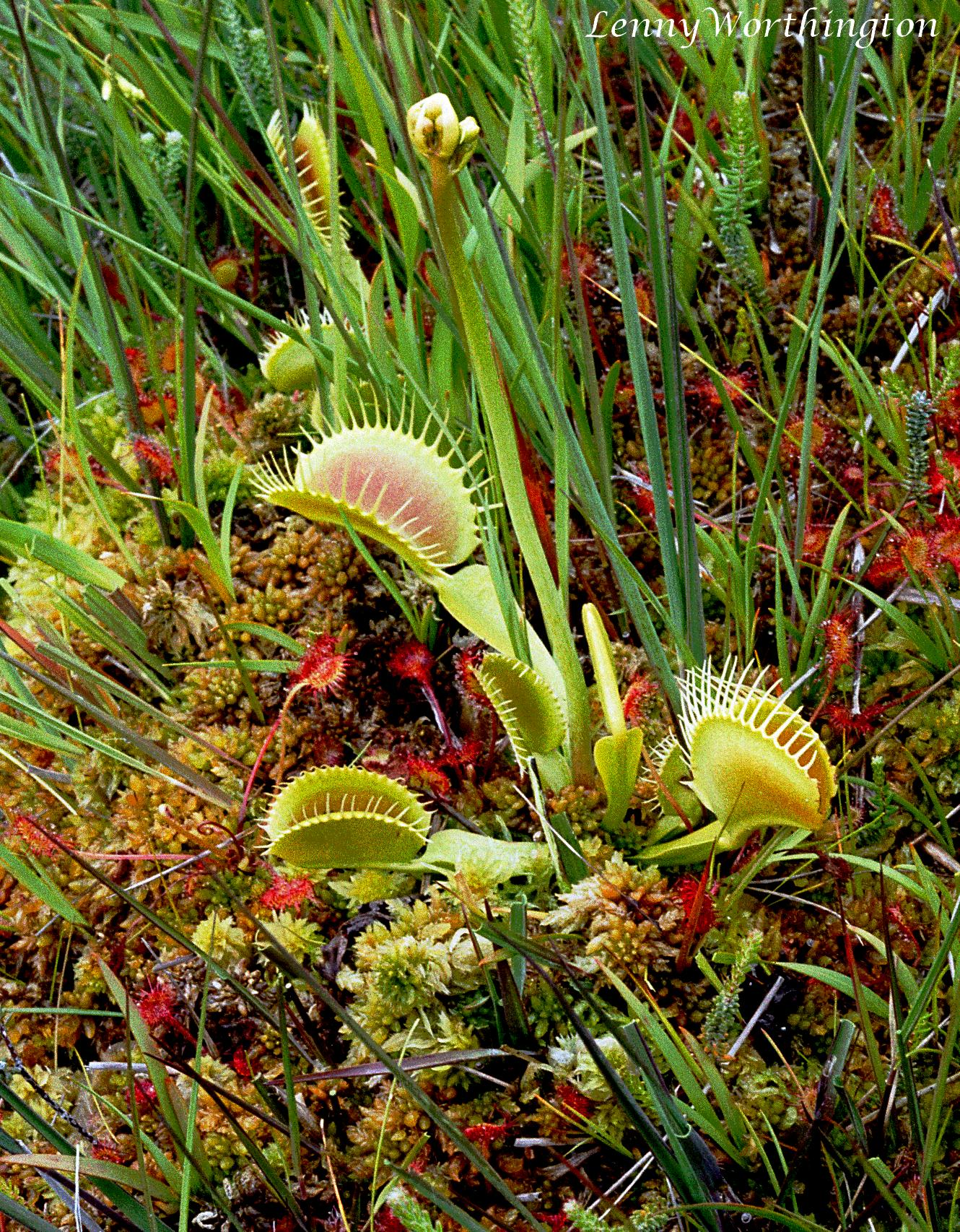
Venus Flytrap

=== Carnivorous plants ===
When it comes to dealing with environments that have low nutrient availability, some plants have developed unique ways to adapt to be able to perform photosynthesis. In order to do so, these plants have evolved to be able to obtain important nutrients such as nitrogen from other organisms, just as heterotrophs would giving them the unique title of carnivorous plants. With methods such as the pitfall trap (pitcher plant), the flypaper trap (Drosera capensis), or the snap trap (venus flytrap) these plants have learned to lure insects in and digest them.

Pitcher plants lure insects in using a variety of attractive cues such as scent and color. Once an insect or small organism falls into the bulb shaped body of the plant, a variety of enzymes are secreted beginning the digestion process of the organism and preventing it from escaping. Flypaper trap plants, the most common of carnivorous plants, secret a special liquid that allow an insect to land on its leaves but then prevents the insect from escaping. The snap trap plant, use similar methods to the pitcher plant in order to attract various insects. However, these carnivorous plants are able to detect when an insect is touching its leaves thus triggering the "mouth" of the plant to close and encase the insect. In developing this method of nutrient acquisition, carnivorous plants are able to survive in almost any environment around the world, excluding Antarctica and the Arctic Circle.

== Secondary production ==
Secondary production is the use of energy stored in plants converted by consumers to their own biomass. Different ecosystems have different levels of consumers, all end with one top consumer. Most energy is stored in organic matter of plants, and as the consumers eat these plants they take up this energy. This energy in the herbivores and omnivores is then consumed by carnivores. There is also a large amount of energy that is in primary production and ends up being waste or litter, referred to as detritus. The detrital food chain includes a large amount of microbes, macroinvertebrates, meiofauna, fungi, and bacteria. These organisms are consumed by omnivores and carnivores and account for a large amount of secondary production. Secondary consumers can vary widely in how efficient they are in consuming. The efficiency of energy being passed on to consumers is estimated to be around 10%. Energy flow through consumers differs in aquatic and terrestrial environments.

=== In aquatic environments ===
Heterotrophs contribute to secondary production and it is dependent on primary productivity and the net primary products. Secondary production is the energy that herbivores and decomposers use and thus depends on primary productivity. Primarily herbivores and decomposers consume all the carbon from two main organic sources in aquatic ecosystems, autochthonous and allochthonous. Autochthonous carbon comes from within the ecosystem and includes aquatic plants, algae and phytoplankton. Allochthonous carbon from outside the ecosystem is mostly dead organic matter from the terrestrial ecosystem entering the water. In stream ecosystems, approximately 66% of annual energy input can be washed downstream. The remaining amount is consumed and lost as heat.

=== In terrestrial environments ===
Secondary production is often described in terms of trophic levels, and while this can be useful in explaining relationships it overemphasizes the rarer interactions. Consumers often feed at multiple trophic levels. Energy transferred above the third trophic level is relatively unimportant. The assimilation efficiency can be expressed by the amount of food the consumer has eaten, how much the consumer assimilates and what is expelled as feces or urine. While a portion of the energy is used for respiration, another portion of the energy goes towards biomass in the consumer. There are two major food chains: the primary food chain is the energy coming from autotrophs and passed on to the consumers; and the second major food chain is when carnivores eat the herbivores or decomposers that consume the autotrophic energy. Consumers are broken down into primary consumers, secondary consumers and tertiary consumers. Carnivores have a much higher assimilation of energy, about 80% and herbivores have a much lower efficiency of approximately 20 to 50%. Energy in a system can be affected by animal emigration/immigration. The movements of organisms are significant in terrestrial ecosystems. Energetic consumption by herbivores in terrestrial ecosystems has a low range of ~3-7%. The flow of energy is similar in many terrestrial environments. The fluctuation in the amount of net primary product consumed by herbivores is generally low. This is in large contrast to aquatic environments of lakes and ponds where grazers have a much higher consumption of around ~33%. Ectotherms and endotherms have very different assimilation efficiencies.

== Detritivores ==
Detritivores consume organic material that is decomposing and are in turn consumed by carnivores. Predator productivity is correlated with prey productivity. This confirms that the primary productivity in ecosystems affects all productivity following.

Detritus is a large portion of organic material in ecosystems. Organic material in temperate forests is mostly made up of dead plants, approximately 62%.

In an aquatic ecosystem, leaf matter that falls into streams gets wet and begins to leech organic material. This happens rather quickly and will attract microbes and invertebrates. The leaves can be broken down into large pieces called coarse particulate organic matter (CPOM). The CPOM is rapidly colonized by microbes. Meiofauna is extremely important to secondary production in stream ecosystems. Microbes breaking down and colonizing this leaf matter are very important to the detritovores. The detritovores make the leaf matter more edible by releasing compounds from the tissues; it ultimately helps soften them. As leaves decay nitrogen will decrease since cellulose and lignin in the leaves is difficult to break down. Thus the colonizing microbes bring in nitrogen in order to aid in the decomposition. Leaf breakdown can depend on initial nitrogen content, season, and species of trees. The species of trees can have variation when their leaves fall. Thus the breakdown of leaves is happening at different times, which is called a mosaic of microbial populations.

Species effect and diversity in an ecosystem can be analyzed through their performance and efficiency. In addition, secondary production in streams can be influenced heavily by detritus that falls into the streams; production of benthic fauna biomass and abundance decreased an additional 47–50% during a study of litter removal and exclusion.

== Energy flow across ecosystems ==
Research has demonstrated that primary producers fix carbon at similar rates across ecosystems. Once carbon has been introduced into a system as a viable source of energy, the mechanisms that govern the flow of energy to higher trophic levels vary across ecosystems. Among aquatic and terrestrial ecosystems, patterns have been identified that can account for this variation and have been divided into two main pathways of control: top-down and bottom-up. The acting mechanisms within each pathway ultimately regulate community and trophic level structure within an ecosystem to varying degrees. Bottom-up controls involve mechanisms that are based on resource quality and availability, which control primary productivity and the subsequent flow of energy and biomass to higher trophic levels. Top-down controls involve mechanisms that are based on consumption by consumers. These mechanisms control the rate of energy transfer from one trophic level to another as herbivores or predators feed on lower trophic levels.

=== Aquatic vs terrestrial ecosystems ===
Much variation in the flow of energy is found within each type of ecosystem, creating a challenge in identifying variation between ecosystem types. In a general sense, the flow of energy is a function of primary productivity with temperature, water availability, and light availability. For example, among aquatic ecosystems, higher rates of production are usually found in large rivers and shallow lakes than in deep lakes and clear headwater streams. Among terrestrial ecosystems, marshes, swamps, and tropical rainforests have the highest primary production rates, whereas tundra and alpine ecosystems have the lowest. The relationships between primary production and environmental conditions have helped account for variation within ecosystem types, allowing ecologists to demonstrate that energy flows more efficiently through aquatic ecosystems than terrestrial ecosystems due to the various bottom-up and top-down controls in play.

==== Bottom-up ====
The strength of bottom-up controls on energy flow are determined by the nutritional quality, size, and growth rates of primary producers in an ecosystem. Photosynthetic material is typically rich in nitrogen (N) and phosphorus (P) and supplements the high herbivore demand for N and P across all ecosystems. Aquatic primary production is dominated by small, single-celled phytoplankton that are mostly composed of photosynthetic material, providing an efficient source of these nutrients for herbivores. In contrast, multi-cellular terrestrial plants contain many large supporting cellulose structures of high carbon but low nutrient value. Because of this structural difference, aquatic primary producers have less biomass per photosynthetic tissue stored within the aquatic ecosystem than in the forests and grasslands of terrestrial ecosystems. This low biomass relative to photosynthetic material in aquatic ecosystems allows for a more efficient turnover rate compared to terrestrial ecosystems. As phytoplankton are consumed by herbivores, their enhanced growth and reproduction rates sufficiently replace lost biomass and, in conjunction with their nutrient dense quality, support greater secondary production.

Additional factors impacting primary production includes inputs of N and P, which occurs at a greater magnitude in aquatic ecosystems. These nutrients are important in stimulating plant growth and, when passed to higher trophic levels, stimulate consumer biomass and growth rate. If either of these nutrients are in short supply, they can limit overall primary production. Within lakes, P tends to be the greater limiting nutrient while both N and P limit primary production in rivers. Due to these limiting effects, nutrient inputs can potentially alleviate the limitations on net primary production of an aquatic ecosystem. Allochthonous material washed into an aquatic ecosystem introduces N and P as well as energy in the form of carbon molecules that are readily taken up by primary producers. Greater inputs and increased nutrient concentrations support greater net primary production rates, which in turn supports greater secondary production.

==== Top-down ====
Top-down mechanisms exert greater control on aquatic primary producers due to the roll of consumers within an aquatic food web. Among consumers, herbivores can mediate the impacts of trophic cascades by bridging the flow of energy from primary producers to predators in higher trophic levels. Across ecosystems, there is a consistent association between herbivore growth and producer nutritional quality. However, in aquatic ecosystems, primary producers are consumed by herbivores at a rate four times greater than in terrestrial ecosystems. Although this topic is highly debated, researchers have attributed the distinction in herbivore control to several theories, including producer to consumer size ratios and herbivore selectivity.

A freshwater food web demonstrating the size differences between each trophic level. Primary producers tend to be small algal cells. Herbivores tend to be small macro-invertebrates. Predators tend to be larger fish.

Modeling of top-down controls on primary producers suggests that the greatest control on the flow of energy occurs when the size ratio of consumer to primary producer is the highest. The size distribution of organisms found within a single trophic level in aquatic systems is much narrower than that of terrestrial systems. On land, the consumer size ranges from smaller than the plant it consumes, such as an insect, to significantly larger, such as an ungulate, while in aquatic systems, consumer body size within a trophic level varies much less and is strongly correlated with trophic position. As a result, the size difference between producers and consumers is consistently larger in aquatic environments than on land, resulting in stronger herbivore control over aquatic primary producers.

Herbivores can potentially control the fate of organic matter as it is cycled through the food web. Herbivores tend to select nutritious plants while avoiding plants with structural defense mechanisms. Like support structures, defense structures are composed of nutrient poor, high carbon cellulose. Access to nutritious food sources enhances herbivore metabolism and energy demands, leading to greater removal of primary producers. In aquatic ecosystems, phytoplankton are highly nutritious and generally lack defense mechanisms. This results in greater top-down control because consumed plant matter is quickly released back into the system as labile organic waste. In terrestrial ecosystems, primary producers are less nutritionally dense and are more likely to contain defense structures. Because herbivores prefer nutritionally dense plants and avoid plants or plant parts with defense structures, a greater amount of plant matter is left unconsumed within the ecosystem. Herbivore avoidance of low-quality plant matter may be why terrestrial systems exhibit weaker top-down control on the flow of energy.

== See also ==
- Food web – Natural interconnection of food chains
- Ecological stoichiometry – Field of study
- Energy – Physical quantity
