= Index of energy articles =

This is an index of energy articles.

== A ==
Activation energy - Alternative energy - Anisotropy energy - Atomic energy

== B ==
Binding energy - Bioenergy - Black hole - Breeder reactor - Brown energy

== C ==
Characteristic energy - Chemical energy - Conservation of energy - Consol Energy

== D ==
Dark energy - Decay energy - Direct Energy - Dirichlet's energy - Dyson's sphere

== E ==
Ecological energetics - Electric potential energy - Electrochemical energy conversion - Embodied energy - Encircled energy - Energy - Energy accidents - Energy accounting - Energy amplifier - Energy applications of nanotechnology - Energy balance (biology) - Energy barrier - Energy being - Energy carrier - Energy Catalyzer - Energy cell - Energy charge - Energy conservation - Energy conversion efficiency - Energy crop - Energy current - Energy density - Energy development - Energy-dispersive X-ray spectroscopy - Energy distance - Energy drift - Energy efficiency gap - Energy-efficient landscaping - Energy elasticity - Energy engineering - Energy (esotericism) - Energy expenditure - Energy factor - Energy field disturbance - Energy filtered transmission electron microscopy - Energy transfer - Energy flow (ecology) - Energy flux - Energy forestry - Energy functional - Energy harvesting - Energy independence - Energy input labeling - Energy landscape - Energy level - Energy level splitting - Energy management software - Energy management system - Energy–maneuverability theory - Energy medicine - Energy–momentum relation - Energy monitoring and targeting - Energy Probe - Energy profile (chemistry) - Energy quality - Energy recovery ventilation - Energy security - Energy (signal processing) - Energy Slave - Energy Star - Energy statistics - Energy storage - Energy system - Energy technology - Energy tower (downdraft) - Energy transfer - Energy transfer upconversion - Energy transformation - Energy value of coal - Enthalpy - Entropy - Equipartition theorem - E-statistic - Exertion

== F ==
Fermi energy - Forms of energy - Fuel - Fusion power

== G ==
Geothermal energy - Gravitational energy - Gravitational potential

== H ==
History of energy - Hydroelectricity

== I ==
Interaction energy - Intermittent energy source - Internal energy - Invariant mass - Ionization energy

== J ==
Josephson energy

== K ==
Kinetic energy

== L ==
Latent heat

== M ==
Magnetic confinement fusion - Marine energy - Mass–energy equivalence - Mechanical energy - Möbius energy - Muzzle energy

== N ==
Negative energy - Nuclear fusion - Nuclear power - Nuclear reactor

== O ==
Orders of magnitude (energy) - Osmotic power

== P ==
Photosynthesis - Potential energy - Power (physics) - Primary energy

== Q ==
Qi - Quasar

== R ==
Renewable energy - Rotational energy

== S ==
Seismic scale - Solar energy - Solar thermal energy - Sound energy - Specific energy - Specific kinetic energy - Specific orbital energy - Surface energy

== T ==
Thermal energy - Thermodynamic free energy - Threshold energy - Tidal power - Turbulence kinetic energy

== U ==
Units of energy

== V ==
Vacuum energy

== W ==
Watt meter - Work (physics) - World energy resources and consumption

== Z ==
Zero-energy building - Zero-energy universe - Zero-point energy

== See also ==
- Category:Energy-related lists
- Category:Energy organizations
