= Environmental impact of the energy industry =

World consumption of primary energy by energy type.

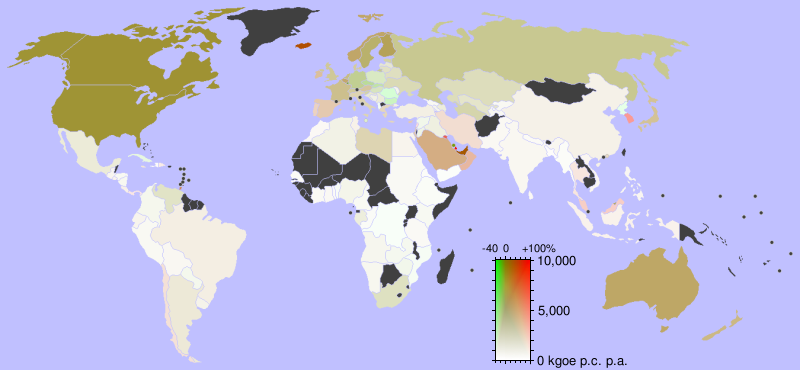
Energy consumption per capita per country (2001). Red hues indicate increase, green hues decrease of consumption during the 1990s.

The environmental impact of the energy industry is significant, as energy and natural resource consumption are closely related. Producing, transporting, or consuming energy all have an environmental impact. Energy has been harnessed by human beings for millennia. Initially it was with the use of fire for light, heat, cooking and for safety, and its use can be traced back at least 1.9 million years. In recent years there has been a trend towards the increased commercialization of various renewable energy sources. Scientific consensus on some of the main human activities that contribute to global warming are considered to be increasing concentrations of greenhouse gases, causing a warming effect, global changes to land surface, such as deforestation, for a warming effect, increasing concentrations of aerosols, mainly for a cooling effect.

Rapidly advancing technologies can potentially achieve a transition of energy generation, water and waste management, and food production towards better environmental and energy usage practices using methods of systems ecology and industrial ecology.

== Issues ==
=== Climate change ===
Global average surface temperature datasets from various scientific organizations show the progress and extent of global warming.

The warming influence (called radiative forcing) of long-lived greenhouse gases has nearly doubled in 40 years, with carbon dioxide and methane being the dominant drivers of global warming.

The scientific consensus on global warming and climate change is that it is caused by anthropogenic greenhouse gas emissions, the majority of which comes from burning fossil fuels with deforestation and some agricultural practices being also major contributors. A 2013 study showed that two thirds of the industrial greenhouse gas emissions are due to the fossil-fuel (and cement) production of just ninety companies around the world (between 1751 and 2010, with half emitted since 1986).

Although there is a highly publicized denial of climate change, the vast majority of scientists working in climatology accept that it is due to human activity. The IPCC report Climate Change 2007: Climate Change Impacts, Adaptation and Vulnerability predicts that climate change will cause shortages of food and water and increased risk of flooding that will affect billions of people, particularly those living in poverty.

One measurement of greenhouse gas related and other externality comparisons between energy sources can be found in the ExternE project by the Paul Scherrer Institut and the University of Stuttgart which was funded by the European Commission. According to that study, hydroelectric electricity produces the lowest CO_{2} emissions, wind produces the second-lowest, nuclear energy produces the third-lowest and solar photovoltaic produces the fourth-lowest.

Similarly, the same research study (ExternE, Externalities of Energy), undertaken from 1995 to 2005 found that the cost of producing electricity from coal or oil would double over its present value, and the cost of electricity production from gas would increase by 30% if external costs such as damage to the environment and to human health, from the airborne particulate matter, nitrogen oxides, chromium VI and arsenic emissions produced by these sources, were taken into account. It was estimated in the study that these external, downstream, fossil fuel costs amount up to 1–2% of the EU's entire Gross Domestic Product (GDP), and this was before the external cost of global warming from these sources was even included. The study also found that the environmental and health costs of nuclear power, per unit of energy delivered, was €0.0019/kWh, which was found to be lower than that of many renewable sources including that caused by biomass and photovoltaic solar panels, and was thirty times lower than coal at €0.06/kWh, or 6 cents/kWh, with the energy sources of the lowest external environmental and health costs associated with it being wind power at €0.0009/kWh.

=== Biofuel use ===
Biofuel is defined as solid, liquid or gaseous fuel obtained from relatively recently lifeless or living biological material and is different from fossil fuels, which are derived from long-dead biological material. Various plants and plant-derived materials are used for biofuel manufacturing.

==== Bio-diesel ====
High use of bio-diesel leads to land use changes including deforestation.

==== Firewood ====
Unsustainable firewood harvesting can lead to loss of biodiversity and erosion due to loss of forest cover. An example of this is a 40-year study done by the University of Leeds of African forests, which account for a third of the world's total tropical forest which demonstrates that Africa is a significant carbon sink. A climate change expert, Lee White states that "To get an idea of the value of the sink, the removal of nearly 5 billion tonnes of carbon dioxide from the atmosphere by intact tropical forests is at issue.

According to the U.N. the African continent is losing forest twice as fast as the rest of the world. "Once upon a time, Africa boasted seven million square kilometers of forest but a third of that has been lost, most of it to charcoal."

=== Fossil fuel use ===
Global fossil carbon emission by fuel type, 1800–2007 AD

The three fossil fuel types are coal, petroleum and natural gas. It was estimated by the Energy Information Administration that in 2006 primary sources of energy consisted of petroleum 36.8%, coal 26.6%, natural gas 22.9%, amounting to an 86% share for fossil fuels in primary energy production in the world.

In 2013 the burning of fossil fuels produced around 32 billion tonnes (32 gigatonnes) of carbon dioxide and additional air pollution. This caused negative externalities of $4.9 trillion due to global warming and health problems (> 150 $/ton carbon dioxide). Carbon dioxide is one of the greenhouse gases that enhances radiative forcing and contributes to global warming, causing the average surface temperature of the Earth to rise in response, which climate scientists agree will cause major adverse effects.

==== Coal ====
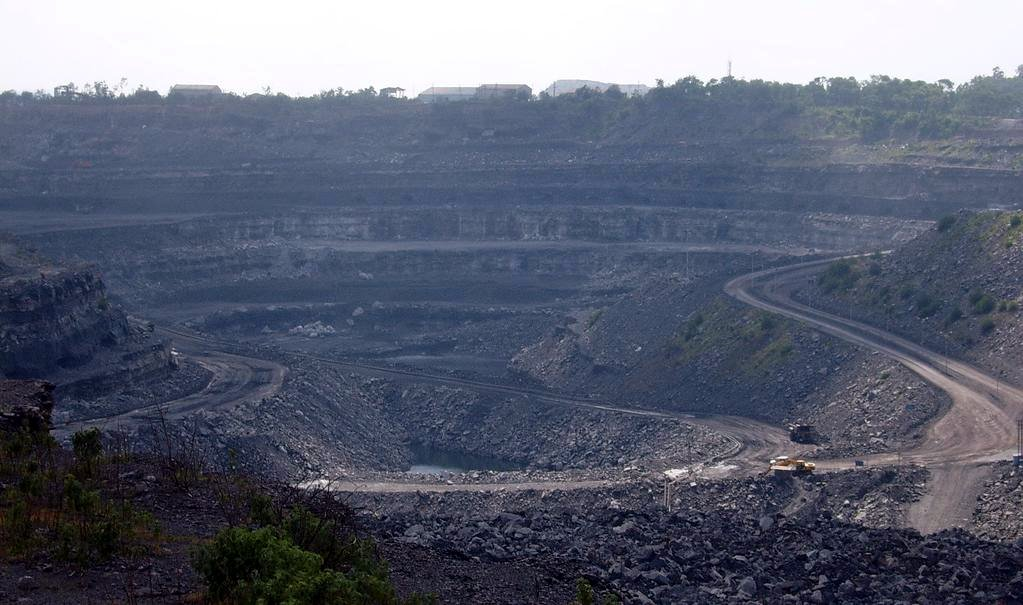
A coal surface mining site at Dhanbad, in Bihar, India

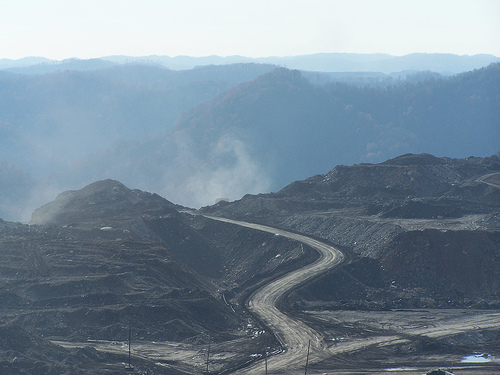
A mountaintop removal mining operation in the United States

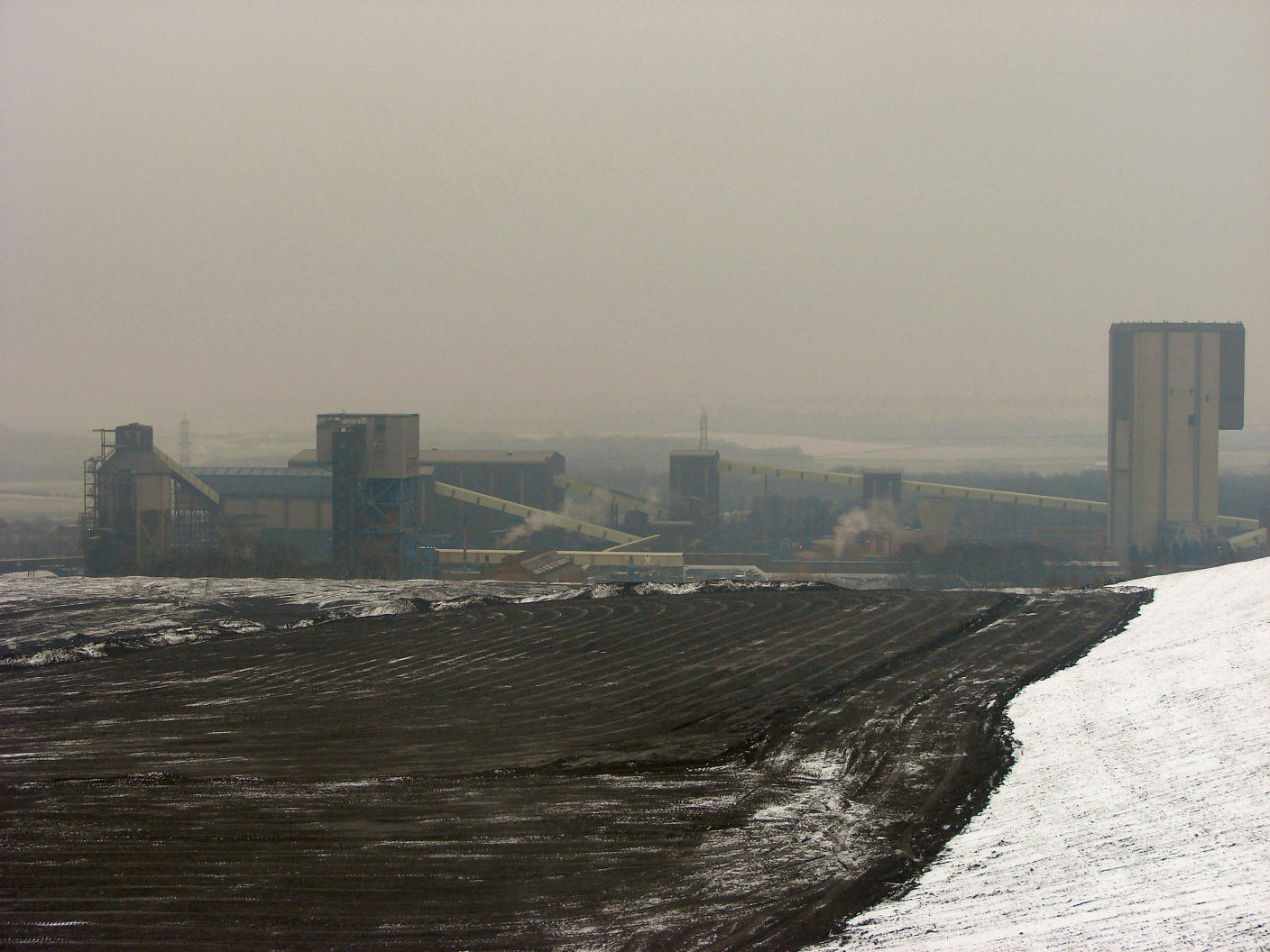
Maltby Main Colliery near Rotherham in South Yorkshire, England in 2007

The health and environmental impact of the coal industry includes issues such as land use, waste management, water and air pollution, caused by the coal mining, processing and the use of its products. In addition to atmospheric pollution, burning coal produces hundreds of millions of tons of solid waste products annually, including fly ash, bottom ash, and flue-gas desulfurization sludge, that contain mercury, uranium, thorium, arsenic, and other heavy metals. Coal is the largest contributor to the human-made increase of carbon dioxide in Earth's atmosphere.

There are severe health effects caused by burning coal. Worldwide 25 people die early for each terawatt hour of electricity generated by coal, around a thousand times more than nuclear or solar.

In addition, there have been many coal mining disasters, although work related coal deaths has declined substantially as safety measures have been enacted and underground mining has given up market share to surface mining. Underground mining hazards include suffocation, gas poisoning, roof collapse and gas explosions. Open cut hazards are principally mine wall failures and vehicle collisions. Hundreds of people died in coal mine accidents in 2022.

==== Petroleum ====
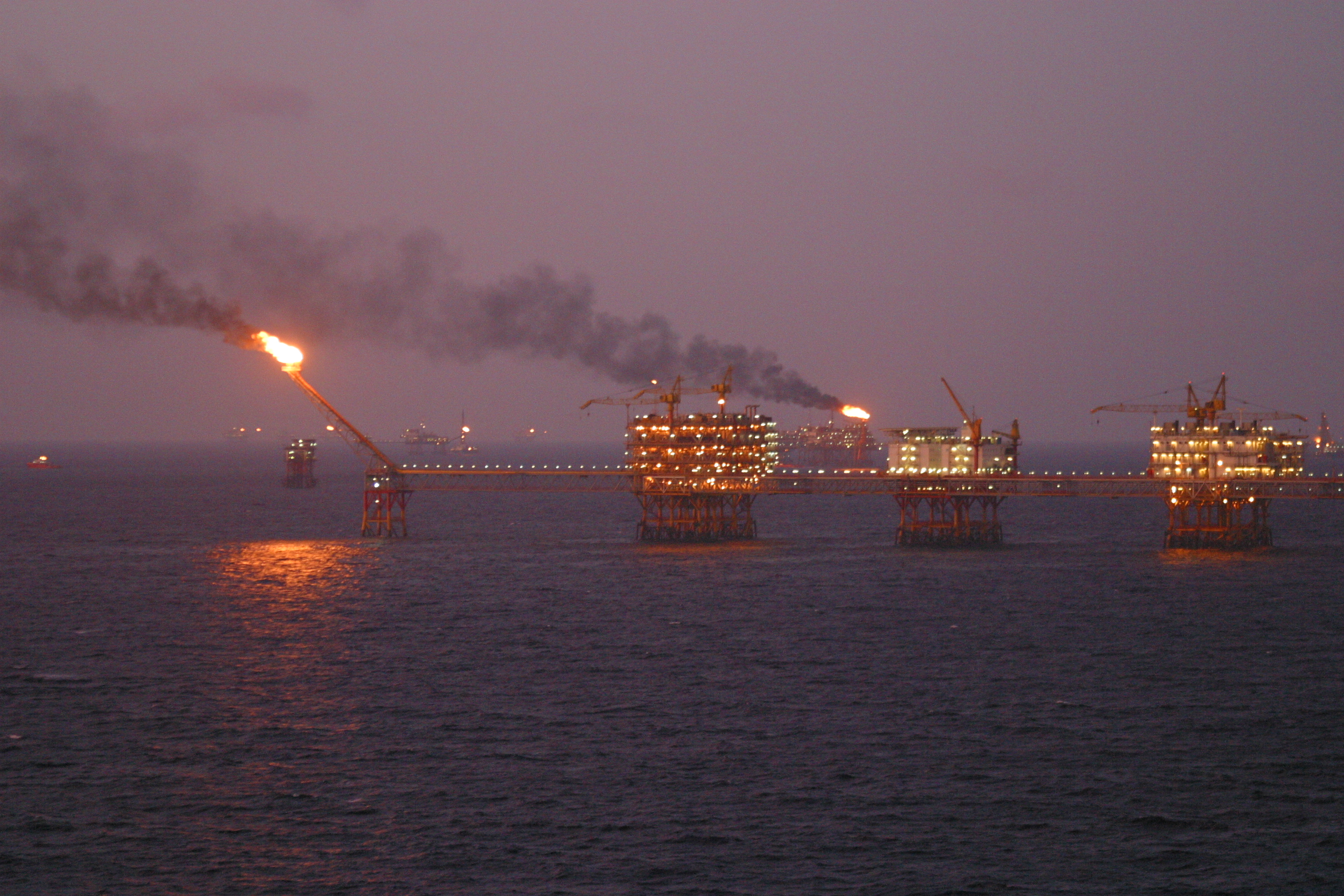
Flaring of gas from offshore oil extraction platforms

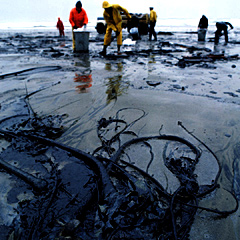
A beach after an oil spill

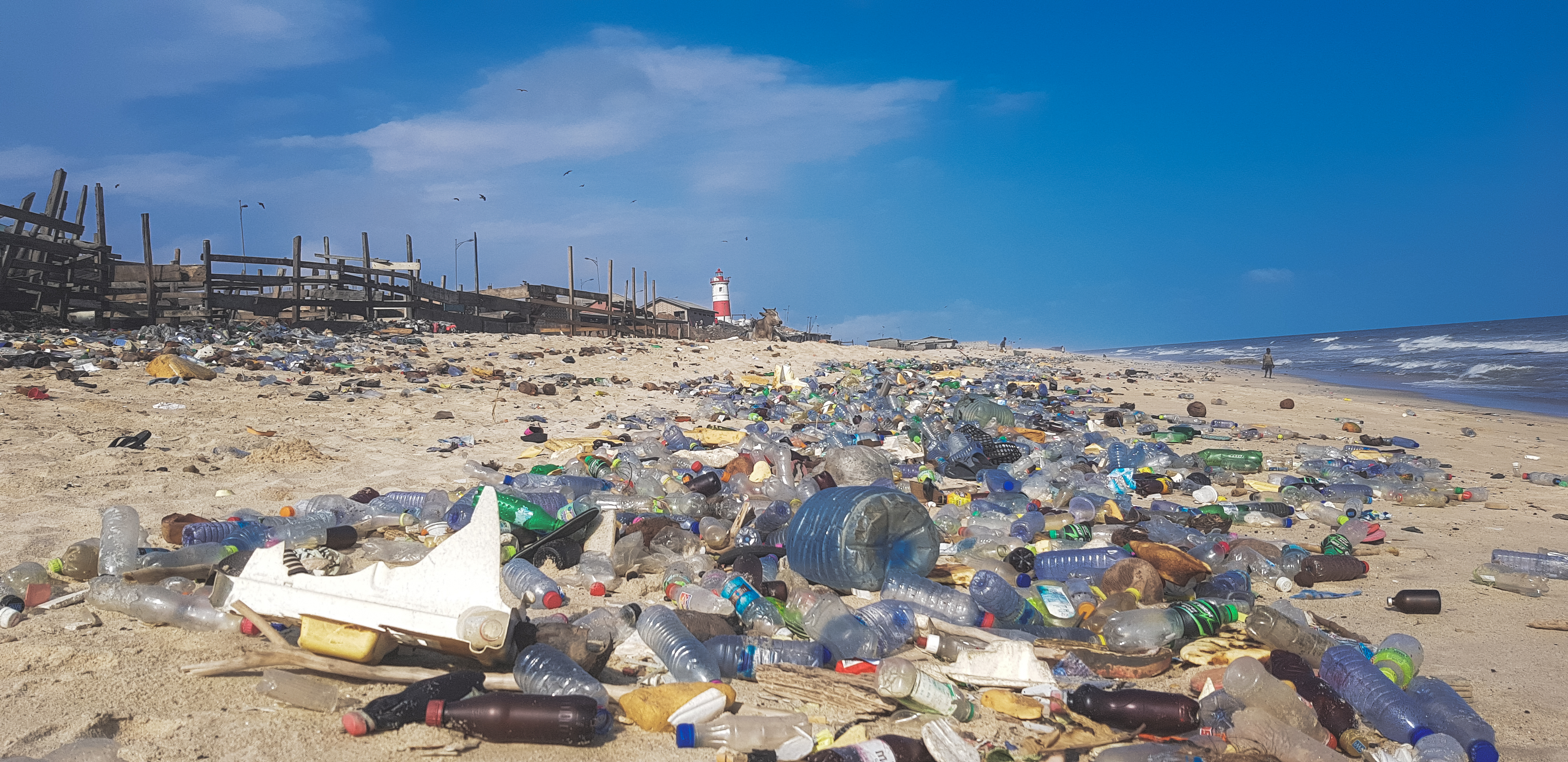
Accumulation of plastic waste on a beach

The environmental impact of the petroleum industry is extensive and expansive due to petroleum having many uses. Crude oil and natural gas are primary energy and raw material sources that enable numerous aspects of modern daily life and the world economy. Their supply has grown quickly over the last 150 years to meet the demands of the rapidly increasing human population, creativity, knowledge, and consumerism.

Substantial quantities of toxic and non-toxic waste are generated during the extraction, refinement, and transportation stages of oil and gas. Some industry by-products, such as volatile organic compounds, nitrogen & sulfur compounds, and spilled oil can pollute the air, water and soil at levels that are harmful to life, when improperly managed. Climate warming, ocean acidification, and sea level rise are global changes enhanced by the industry's emissions of greenhouse gases like carbon dioxide (CO_{2}) and methane, and micro-particulate aerosols like black carbon. Vehicle tailpipe emissions kill many people.

Among all human activities, fossil fuel combustion is the largest contributor to the ongoing buildup of carbon in the Earth's biosphere. The International Energy Agency and others report that oil & gas use comprises over 55% (18 billion tons) of the recorded 32.8 billion tons (BT) of CO_{2} released into the atmosphere from all energy sources in year 2017. Coal use comprised most of the remaining 45%. Total emissions continue to rise nearly every year: from 1.7% to 33.1 BT in 2018.

Through its operations, the petroleum industry directly contributed about 8% (2.7 BT) of the 32.8 BT in 2017. Also, due to its intentional and other releases of natural gas, the industry directly contributed at least 79 million tons of methane (2.4 BT CO_{2}-equivalent) that same year; an amount equal to about 14% of all known anthropogenic and natural emissions of the potent warming gas.

Along with fuels like gasoline and liquefied natural gas, petroleum enables many consumer chemicals and products, such as fertilizers and plastics. Most alternative technologies for energy generation, transportation, and storage can only be realized at this time because of its diverse usefulness. Conservation, efficiency, and minimizing waste impacts of petroleum products are effective industry and consumer actions toward achieving better environmental sustainability.

On November 12, 2025, 2 billion people live within 5 km of more than 18,000 operating fossil fuel infrastructure sites distributed across 170 countries around the world, while 463 million are living within 1 km of the sites exposing them to much higher environmental and health risks. In total, 2.463 billion people live within 1 km-5 km of 18,000 fossil fuel sites in 170 countries. Adding 3,500 fossil fuel sites built globally to 21,500 global fossil fuel sites, would increase by 135 million people to 2.6 billion people.

==== Gas ====
Natural gas is often described as the cleanest fossil fuel, producing less carbon dioxide per joule delivered than either coal or oil, and far fewer pollutants than other fossil fuels. However, in absolute terms, it does contribute substantially to global carbon emissions, and this contribution is projected to grow. According to the IPCC Fourth Assessment Report, in 2004 natural gas produced about 5,300 Mt/yr of CO_{2} emissions, while coal and oil produced 10,600 and 10,200 respectively (Figure 4.4); but by 2030, according to an updated version of the SRES B2 emissions scenario, natural gas would be the source of 11,000 Mt/yr, with coal and oil now 8,400 and 17,200 respectively. (Total global emissions for 2004 were estimated at over 27,200 Mt.)

In addition, natural gas itself is a greenhouse gas far more potent than carbon dioxide when released into the atmosphere but is released in smaller amounts. The environmental impacts of Natural gas also vary substantially on their extraction processes, much natural gas is a byproduct of heavily polluting petroleum extraction and newer techniques for hydraulic fracturing have made natural gas reserves that were previously unaccusable available, but with many more negative environmental and health impacts that traditional natural gas extraction.

=== Electricity generation ===
The environmental impact of electricity generation is significant because modern society uses large amounts of electrical power. This power is normally generated at power plants that convert some other kind of energy into electrical power. Each such system has advantages and disadvantages, but many of them pose environmental concerns.

==== Reservoirs ====
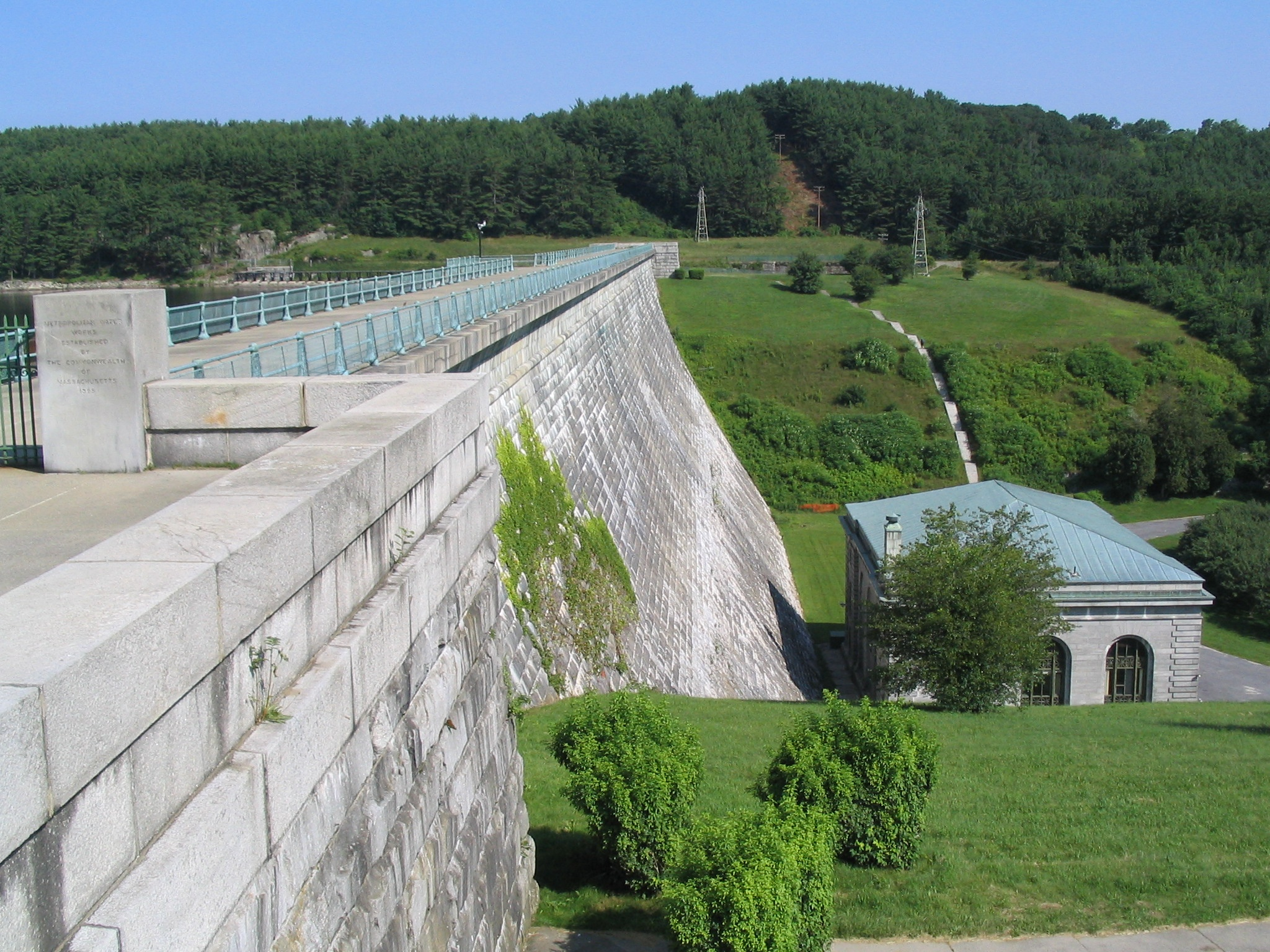
The Wachusett Dam in Clinton, Massachusetts

The environmental impact of reservoirs comes under ever-increasing scrutiny as the global demand for water and energy increases and the number and size of reservoirs increases.

Dams and reservoirs can be used to supply drinking water, generate hydroelectric power, increase the water supply for irrigation, provide recreational opportunities, and flood control. In 1960 the construction of Llyn Celyn and the flooding of Capel Celyn provoked political uproar which continues to this day. More recently, the construction of Three Gorges Dam and other similar projects throughout Asia, Africa and Latin America have generated considerable environmental and political debate. Currently, 48 percent of rivers and their hydro-ecological systems are affected by reservoirs and dams.

==== Nuclear power ====
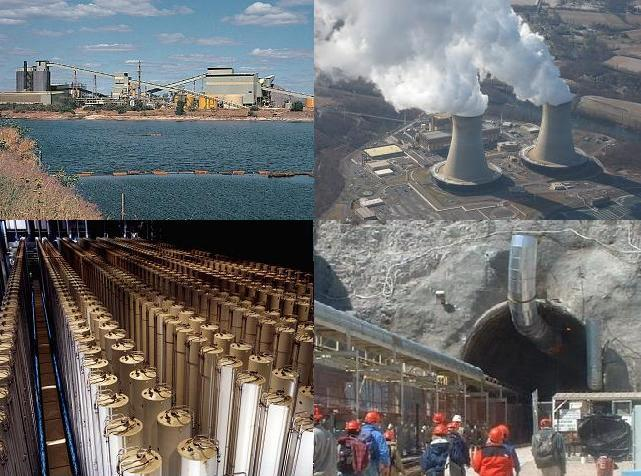
Nuclear power activities involving the environment; mining, enrichment, generation and geological disposal.

The environmental impact of nuclear power results from the nuclear fuel cycle, operation, and the effects of nuclear accidents.

The routine health risks and greenhouse gas emissions from nuclear fission power are significantly smaller than those associated with coal, oil and gas. However, there is a "catastrophic risk" potential if containment fails, which in nuclear reactors can be brought about by over-heated fuels melting and releasing large quantities of fission products into the environment. The most long-lived radioactive wastes, including spent nuclear fuel, must be contained and isolated from humans and the environment for hundreds of thousands of years. The public is sensitive to these risks and there has been considerable public opposition to nuclear power. Despite this potential for disaster, normal fossil fuel related pollution is still considerably more harmful than any previous nuclear disaster.

The 1979 Three Mile Island accident and 1986 Chernobyl disaster, along with high construction costs, ended the rapid growth of global nuclear power capacity. A further disastrous release of radioactive materials followed the 2011 Japanese tsunami which damaged the Fukushima I Nuclear Power Plant, resulting in hydrogen gas explosions and partial meltdowns classified as a Level 7 event. The large-scale release of radioactivity resulted in people being evacuated from a 20 km exclusion zone set up around the power plant, similar to the 30 km radius Chernobyl Exclusion Zone still in effect.

== Mitigation ==
=== Energy conservation ===
Energy conservation refers to efforts made to reduce energy consumption. Energy conservation can be achieved through increased efficient energy use, in conjunction with decreased energy consumption and/or reduced consumption from conventional energy sources.

Energy conservation can result in increased financial capital, environmental quality, national security, personal security, and human comfort. Individuals and organizations that are direct consumers of energy choose to conserve energy to reduce energy costs and promote economic security. Industrial and commercial users can increase energy use efficiency to maximize profit.

The increase of global energy use can also be slowed by tackling human population growth, by using non-coercive measures such as better provision of family planning services and by empowering (educating) women in developing countries.

An EU survey conducted on climate and energy consumption in 2022 found that 63% of people in the European Union want energy costs to be dependent on use, with the greatest consumers paying more. This is compared to 83% in China, 63% in the UK and 57% in the US.

=== Energy policy ===
Energy policy is the manner in which a given entity (often governmental) has decided to address issues of energy development including energy production, distribution and consumption. The attributes of energy policy may include legislation, international treaties, incentives to investment, guidelines for energy conservation, taxation and other public policy techniques.

== See also ==
- Energy accounting
- Energy & Environment
- Energy economics
- Energy flow (ecology)
- Energy industry
- Energy quality
- Energy transformation
- Environmental impact of aviation
- Environmental impact of electricity generation
- Environmental impact of hydraulic fracturing
- Index of energy articles
- Industrial ecology
- List of energy storage projects
- List of environmental issues
- Low-carbon power
- Systems ecology
- The Venus Project
- Thermoeconomics
