= Banseri =

- Location within Pakistan
- Coordinates: 34.09°N 73.08°E
- Country: Pakistan
- Province: Khyber Pakhtunkhwa
- Elevation: 1,168 m (3,832 ft)
- Time zone: UTC+5 (PST)

Banseri is a village of Abbottabad District in the Khyber Pakhtunkhwa province of Pakistan. It is located at 34°9'0N 73°8'0E with an altitude of 1168 metres (3835 feet). Neighbouring settlements include Mukhdabbi, Saliot, and Baghati.
