= Mukhdabbi =

- Location within Pakistan
- Coordinates: 34.09°N 73.07°E
- Country: Pakistan
- Province: Khyber Pakhtunkhwa
- Elevation: 1,137 m (3,730 ft)
- Time zone: UTC+5 (PST)

Mukhdabbi is a village in the Khyber Pakhtunkhwa province of Pakistan. It is located at 34°9'0N 73°7'0E with an altitude of 1137 metres (3733 feet). Neighbouring settlements include Jalalia, Gup and Bain Gojri.
