= Gup =

Gup or GUP may refer to:

== Places ==
- Gup, Pakistan
- Gallup Municipal Airport, in New Mexico, United States

== Positions ==
- Gup (village chief), in Bhutan
- Geup, a Korean term of rank

== Other uses ==
- Kunwinjku language
- Ted Gup (born 1950), American writer
- Girls und Panzer, an anime and manga franchise
- The name of vehicles in The Octonauts
- The name of an enemy from Risk of Rain
- Generalized uncertainty principle
