= Baghati =

Baghati may refer to:

- anything of or related to Baghat, a region in Himachal Pradesh, India
- Baghati dialect, a dialect of Mahasu Pahari language spoken in Himachal Pradesh, India
- Baghati, Chanditala-I, a village in West Bengal, India
- Baghati, Pakistan, a village in Pakistan
