= Jalalia =

Jalalia may refer to:

- Jalalia, Attock, a village in Attock district, Pakistan
- Jalalia, Abbottabad, a village in Abbottabd district, Pakistan
- Jalalia (leafhopper), a leafhopper genus in the tribe Erythroneurini
