= Chamhad Union Council =

Chamhad
- Union Council
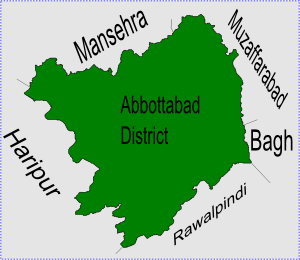
- Chamad is located in Abbottabad District
- Interactive map of Chamhad
- Coordinates: 34°07′00″N 73°05′00″E
- Country: Pakistan
- Province: Khyber Pakhtunkhwa
- District: Abbottabad
- Tehsil: Abbottabad

Government
  - Nazim: Falasfar Khan
  - Naib Nazim: Muhammad Shamraiz Khan

Population (2017)
  - Total: 9,451

Chamhad is one of the 51 Union Councils (subdivisions) of Abbottabad District in the Khyber Pakhtunkhwa province of Pakistan.

== Location ==
Chamad is located at 34°7'0N 73°4'60E, in the west of the district where it forms part of Abbottabad's border with Haripur District. It has an average elevation of 870 metres (2857 feet). Neighbouring settlements include Patian, Baghdara and Talhad and Sarbangala

== Subdivisions ==
- Bagh Darah
- Beram Gali
- Bisala
- Chamak Mera
- Chamhad
- Fateh Bandi
- Khani That Hiara
- Sar Bangala
- Shadial
