= Conjugate variables =

Variables that are Fourier transform duals

Conjugate variables are pairs of variables mathematically defined in such a way that they become Fourier transform duals, or more generally are related through Pontryagin duality. The duality relations lead naturally to an uncertainty relation—in physics called the Heisenberg uncertainty principle—between them. In mathematical terms, conjugate variables are part of a symplectic basis, and the uncertainty relation corresponds to the symplectic form. Also, conjugate variables are related by Noether's theorem, which states that if the laws of physics are invariant with respect to a change in one of the conjugate variables, then the other conjugate variable will not change with time (i.e. it will be conserved). Conjugate variables in thermodynamics are widely used.

== Examples ==
There are many types of conjugate variables, depending on the type of work a certain system is doing (or is being subjected to). Examples of canonically conjugate variables include the following:

- Time and frequency: the longer a musical note is sustained, the more precisely we know its frequency, but it spans a longer duration and is thus a more-distributed event or 'instant' in time. Conversely, a very short musical note becomes just a click, and so is more temporally-localized, but one can't determine its frequency very accurately.
- Doppler and range: the more we know about how far away a radar target is, the less we can know about the exact velocity of approach or retreat, and vice versa. In this case, the two dimensional function of doppler and range is known as a radar ambiguity function or radar ambiguity diagram.
- Surface energy: γ dA (γ = surface tension; A = surface area).
- Elastic stretching: F dL (F = elastic force; L length stretched).
- Energy and time: Units $\Delta E \times \Delta t$ being kg⋅m^{2}/s.

=== Derivatives of action ===
In classical physics, the derivatives of action are conjugate variables to the quantity with respect to which one is differentiating. In quantum mechanics, these same pairs of variables are related by the Heisenberg uncertainty principle.

- The energy of a particle at a certain event is the negative of the derivative of the action along a trajectory of that particle ending at that event with respect to the time of the event.
- The linear momentum of a particle is the derivative of its action with respect to its position.
- The angular momentum of a particle is the derivative of its action with respect to its orientation (angular position).
- The mass-moment ($\mathbf{N}=t\mathbf{p}-E\mathbf{r}$) of a particle is the negative of the derivative of its action with respect to its rapidity.
- The electric potential (φ, voltage) and electric charge in a quantum LC circuit.
- The magnetic potential (A) at an event is the derivative of the action of the electromagnetic field with respect to the density of (free) electric current at that event.
- The electric field (E) at an event is the derivative of the action of the electromagnetic field with respect to the electric polarization density at that event.
- The magnetic induction (B) at an event is the derivative of the action of the electromagnetic field with respect to the magnetization at that event.
- The Newtonian gravitational potential at an event is the negative of the derivative of the action of the Newtonian gravitation field with respect to the mass density at that event.

=== Quantum theory ===
In quantum mechanics, conjugate variables are realized as pairs of observables whose operators do not commute. In conventional terminology, they are said to be incompatible observables. Consider, as an example, the measurable quantities given by position $\left (x \right)$ and momentum $\left (p \right)$. In the quantum-mechanical formalism, the two observables $x$ and $p$ correspond to operators $\widehat{x}$ and $\widehat{p\,}$, which necessarily satisfy the canonical commutation relation:
$$[\widehat{x},\widehat{p\,}]=\widehat{x}\widehat{p\,}-\widehat{p\,}\widehat{x}=i \hbar$$

For every non-zero commutator of two operators, there exists an "uncertainty principle", which in our present example may be expressed in the form:
$$\Delta x \, \Delta p \geq \hbar/2$$

In this ill-defined notation, $\Delta x$ and $\Delta p$ denote "uncertainty" in the simultaneous specification of $x$ and $p$. A more precise, and statistically complete, statement involving the standard deviation $\sigma$ reads:
$$\sigma_x \sigma_p \geq \hbar/2$$

More generally, for any two observables $A$ and $B$ corresponding to operators $\widehat{A}$ and $\widehat{B}$, the generalized uncertainty principle is given by:
$${\sigma_A}^2 {\sigma_B}^2 \geq \left (\frac{1}{2i} \left \langle \left [ \widehat{A},\widehat{B} \right ] \right \rangle \right)^2$$

Now suppose we were to explicitly define two particular operators, assigning each a specific mathematical form, such that the pair satisfies the aforementioned commutation relation. It's important to remember that our particular "choice" of operators would merely reflect one of many equivalent, or isomorphic, representations of the general algebraic structure that fundamentally characterizes quantum mechanics. The generalization is provided formally by the Heisenberg Lie algebra $\mathfrak h_3$, with a corresponding group called the Heisenberg group $H_3$.

=== Fluid mechanics ===
In Hamiltonian fluid mechanics and quantum hydrodynamics, the action itself (or velocity potential) is the conjugate variable of the density (or probability density).

== See also ==
- Canonical coordinates
