= Baghdara =

Pakistani village

- Location within Pakistan
- Coordinates: 34.08°N 73.05°E
- Country: Pakistan
- Province: Khyber Pakhtunkhwa
- Elevation: 1,017 m (3,337 ft)
- Time zone: UTC+5 (PST)

Baghdara Malik Romail awan house

is a village of Abbottabad District in Khyber Pakhtunkhwa province of Pakistan. It is located at 34°8'0N 73°5'0E with an altitude of 1017 metres (3339 feet). Neighbouring settlements include Patian, Bagwal Bandi and Chamhad.
