= Energy transformation =

Process of changing energy

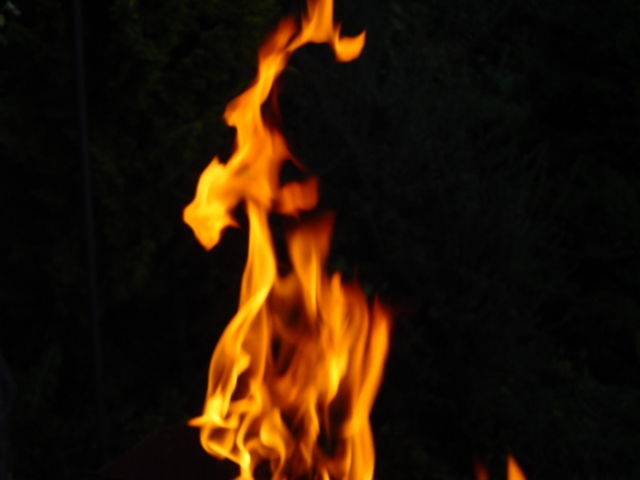
Fire is an example of energy transformation from chemical energy stored in the fuel into heat and light.

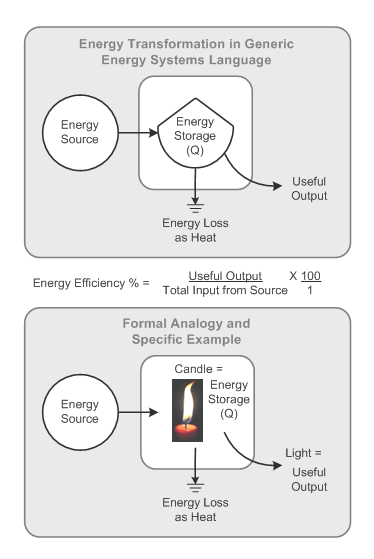
Energy transformation using Energy Systems Language

Energy transformation, also known as energy conversion, is the process of changing energy from one form to another. In physics, energy is a quantity that provides the capacity to perform work (e.g. lifting an object) or provides heat. Energy can be converted to different forms or transferred to a different location or object or living being, but it cannot be created or destroyed.

== History ==
The human study and use of different kinds of energy transformations may date back to prehistory with the first technological uses of fire. However, formalized and scientific studies of energy transformations are closely tied to the field of thermodynamics. Otto van Guericke invented the first vacuum pump in 1650, which set off a series of studies of pumps and pressurization systems. This line of inquiry eventually enabled the development of the first engines which could transform heat into mechanical work. The first engine was invented by Thomas Savery in 1697 and was shortly followed by Thomas Newcomen's engine in 1712.

These early engines had very low efficiencies, making them impractical for widespread use, but they inspired further study. In 1776, James Watt commercially introduced his improved steam engine, which achieved higher efficiency by using an external condenser. Sadi Carnot, often called "the father of thermodynamics", later published Reflections on the Motive Power of Fire (1824). In this book, he developed the idea of the Carnot cycle, one of several theoretical ideal heat engine cycles recognized today.

The study of energy transformations continues to play important practical and theoretical roles in science. For example, engineers of power plant systems work to minimize losses at different stages of converting energy sources (e.g. fossil fuels, sunlight, or wind) into usable electrical energy.

== Thermodynamics of energy transformation ==
According to the first law of thermodynamics, energy can never be created or destroyed in an isolated system, but it can move from one part of the system to another or be converted between different kinds of energy that can do work (free energy) and energy in the form of heat. However, the second law of thermodynamics states that the entropy of a system always stays the same or increases, and never decreases. Combining the first and second laws, it can be shown that 1) free energy must be spent to generate entropy and therefore 2) energy transfer always decreases (or preserves) total free energy and increases (or preserves) total energy stored as heat. As a result, any time energy is transformed or transferred, the amount of free energy available with which to do work either stays the same or decreases. The conversion efficiency of energy transfer refers to the ratio of total work done divided by total heat transferred, and per the above laws of thermodynamics it is always less than 100%.

=== Heat engines ===
Generally, thermodynamics studies energy transformations through the lens of cycles, or closed paths composed of process steps along a phase space of two thermodynamic variables. A cycle which uses heat transfer from hot to cold to generate work is called a heat engine or power cycle. Heat engines can be classified based on the type of cycle they implement. Some examples of cycles that can be used as heat engines include the Carnot cycle, the Rankine cycle, the Brayton cycle, and the Stirling cycle. Different cycles have different maximum efficiencies and may be more or less practical to implement for specific applications. Thermodynamic analysis of a heat engine typically seeks to compute quantities like the work performed at each process step, the heat input, and overall efficiency of the energy transformation. Energy generation for the electrical grid occurs in systems such as steam plants, coal-fired power stations, and gas turbine engines, which can all be described as various kinds of heat engines.

=== Efficiency and loss in energy transformation ===
As discussed above, the amount of free energy available is always stable or decreasing, since heat cannot be transformed into work with 100% efficiency. However, converting free energy to other kinds of free energy is constrained only by the conservation of energy, so it can theoretically occur with 100% efficiency. A process in which free energy is not lost is called a reversible transformation, while lossy processes are called irreversible transformations. Due to the close relationship between thermodynamics and information science, reversibility plays an important role in computation, especially in quantum computing where generation of heat is particularly undesirable. Most energy transformation processes are irreversible, and one hypothetical fate of the universe is that eventually all free energy will be converted to diffuse, equilibrated heat that can no longer do work. This fate is known as "heat death" or "the Big Freeze."

In practice, the conversion of free energy to heat can be observed as friction, drag, electrical resistance, direct creation of long-wavelength electromagnetic radiation, or similar processes. Friction and drag are minimal in a vacuum, where for example gravitational potential energy can be converted to and from kinetic energy with very low loss during orbits of celestial bodies in outer space. Kepler's laws essentially assume no free energy is lost. Similarly, superconductors have no resistance to direct current and low resistance to alternating currents, so electrical energy can be used to perform reversible computations in superconducting qubits.

In a heat engine, heat can be converted into work by leveraging a difference in temperature between two regions. One way of writing the second law of thermodynamics is in terms of entropy. This formulation states that the total change in entropy due to any given process has two components, $(dS)_f$ and $(dS)_g$, corresponding to entropy flow into a system from its environment and entropy generated inside the system, respectively. Because total entropy cannot decrease, $(dS)_g$ is always greater than or equal to 0. Entropy flow is closely related to heat flow $\delta Q$ and process temperature:

$(dS)_f = \frac{\delta Q}{T}$.

The heat flow that is used to generate entropy decreases the amount of heat available to do work with, hence decreasing the efficiency of the engine. This equation also implies that when a system is in thermal equilibrium, i.e. heat flow has stopped and energy remains constant, entropy is maximized.

In order to make energy transformation more efficient, it is desirable to minimize the number of steps which convert heat to work. For example, the efficiency of nuclear reactors, where the kinetic energy of the nuclei is first converted to thermal energy and then to electrical energy, lies at around 35%. Converting kinetic energy directly to electric energy, eliminating the intermediate thermal energy transformation, can significantly improve the efficiency of the energy transformation process.

== Energy transformation in cosmology ==
Energy transformations in the universe over time are usually characterized by various kinds of energy, which have been available since the Big Bang, later being "released" (that is, transformed to more active types of energy such as kinetic or radiant energy) by a triggering mechanism.

=== Transformation of gravitational potential energy into heat ===
A direct transformation of energy occurs when hydrogen produced in the Big Bang collects into structures such as planets, in a process during which part of the gravitational potential is converted directly into heat. In Jupiter, Saturn, and Neptune, for example, such heat from the continued collapse of the planets' large gas atmospheres continues to drive most of the planets' weather systems. These systems, consisting of atmospheric bands, winds, and powerful storms, are only partly powered by sunlight. However, on Uranus, little of this process occurs. This is likely because the planet emits very little internal heat compared to other gas giants, possibly due to a past giant impact that released much of its primordial heat or an interior structure that inhibits efficient heat transport.

On Earth, a significant portion of the heat output from the interior of the planet, estimated at a third to half of the total, is caused by the slow collapse of planetary materials to a smaller size, generating heat.

=== Transformation of radioactive potential energy into heat ===
Familiar examples of other such processes transforming energy from the Big Bang include nuclear decay, which releases energy that was originally "stored" in heavy isotopes, such as uranium and thorium. This energy was stored at the time of the nucleosynthesis of these elements. This process uses the gravitational potential energy released from the collapse of Type II supernovae to create these heavy elements before they are incorporated into star systems such as the Solar System and the Earth. The energy locked into uranium is released spontaneously during most types of radioactive decay, and can be suddenly released in nuclear fission bombs. In both cases, a portion of the energy binding the atomic nuclei together is released as heat.

=== Transformation of energy from nuclear fusion of hydrogen ===
In a similar chain of transformations beginning at the dawn of the universe, nuclear fusion of hydrogen in the Sun releases another store of potential energy which was created at the time of the Big Bang. At that time, according to the theory of Big Bang nucleosynthesis, space expanded and the universe cooled too rapidly for hydrogen to completely fuse into heavier elements. This resulted in hydrogen representing a store of potential energy which can be released by nuclear fusion. Such a fusion process is triggered by heat and pressure generated from the gravitational collapse of hydrogen clouds when they produce stars, and some of the fusion energy is then transformed into starlight. Within the Solar System, starlight, overwhelmingly from the Sun, may again be stored as gravitational potential energy after it strikes the Earth. This occurs in the case of avalanches, or when water evaporates from oceans and is deposited as precipitation high above sea level. After being released at a hydroelectric dam, such water can be used to drive turbines and generators to produce electricity.

Sunlight also drives many weather phenomena on Earth. One example is a hurricane, which occurs when large unstable areas of warm ocean, heated over months, give up some of their thermal energy suddenly to power a few days of violent air movement. Sunlight is also captured by plants as a chemical potential energy via photosynthesis, when carbon dioxide and water are converted into a combustible combination of carbohydrates, lipids, and oxygen. The release of this energy as heat and light may be triggered suddenly by a spark, in a forest fire; or it may be available more slowly for animal or human metabolism when these molecules are ingested, and catabolism is triggered by enzyme action.

Through all of these transformation chains, the potential energy stored at the time of the Big Bang is later released as more active energy by intermediate events, sometimes being stored in several different ways for long periods between releases. All of these events involve the conversion of one kind of energy into others, including heat.

== Examples ==
=== Examples of sets of energy conversions in machines ===
A coal-fired power plant involves these energy transformations:

1. Chemical energy in the coal is converted into thermal energy by burning coal in a boiler to produce exhaust gases.
2. Thermal energy of the exhaust gases in the boiler is converted into thermal energy and kinetic energy of high-pressured steam through heat exchange between the gases and the boiler water.
3. Kinetic energy of steam is converted to mechanical energy as the steam flows into a turbine.
4. Mechanical energy of the turbine is converted to electrical energy by spinning the generator. This is the ultimate output.

In such a system, the first and fourth steps are highly efficient, but the second and third steps are less efficient. Other types of power plants can be more efficient. For example, natural gas plants in the US in 2019 overall converted 45% of the energy stored in the fuel into usable electrical energy. In comparison, coal plants converted only 33% of stored energy into electrical energy.

In a conventional automobile, the following energy transformations occur:

1. Chemical energy in the fuel is converted into kinetic energy of expanding gas via combustion
2. Kinetic energy of expanding gas converted to the linear piston movement
3. Linear piston movement converted to rotary crankshaft movement
4. Rotary crankshaft movement passed into transmission assembly
5. Rotary movement passed out of transmission assembly
6. Rotary movement passed through a differential
7. Rotary movement passed out of differential to drive wheels
8. Rotary movement of drive wheels converted to linear motion of the vehicle

=== Other energy conversions ===
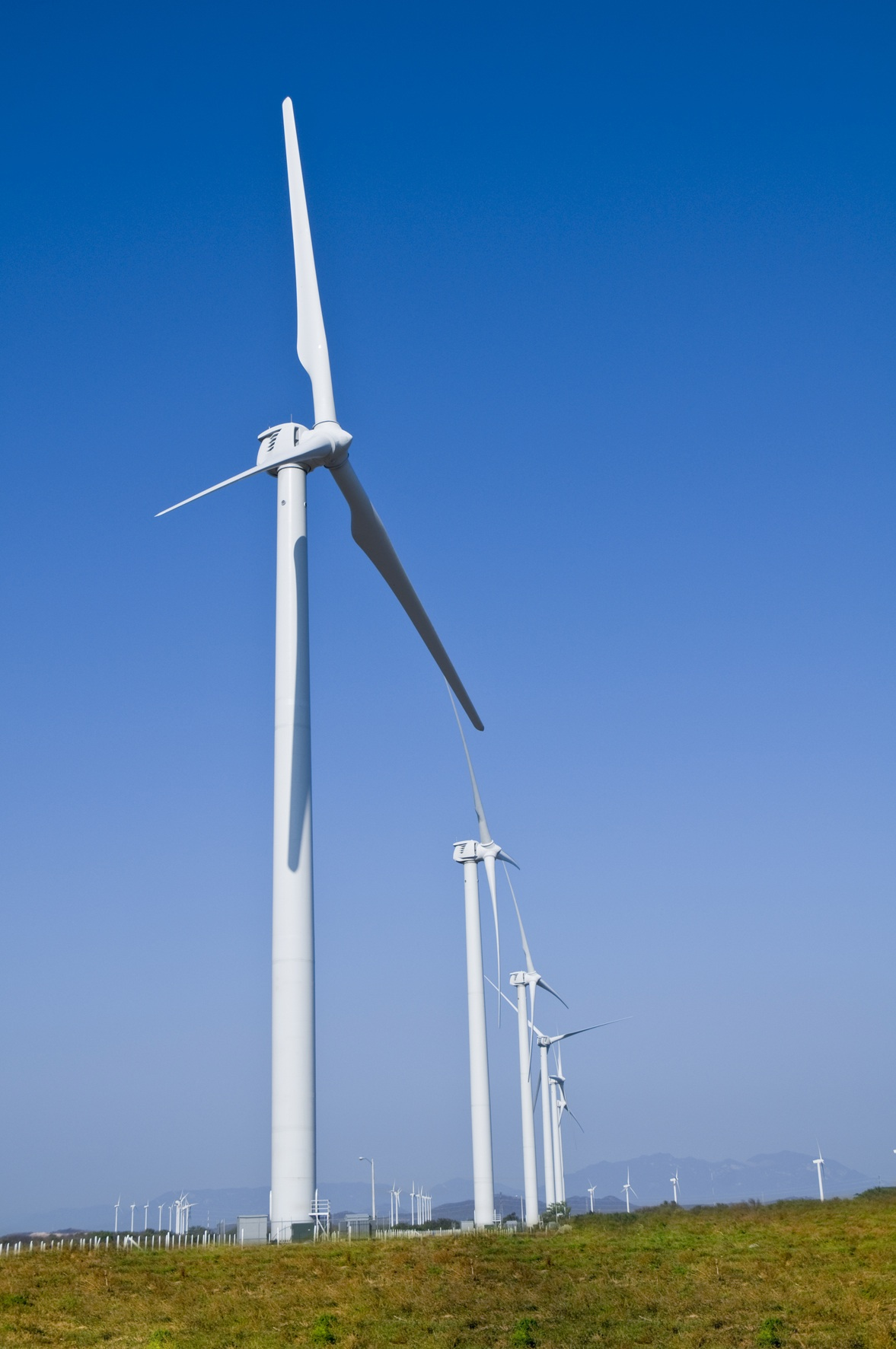
Lamatalaventosa Wind Farm

There are many different systems, both natural and engineered, which act as transducers that convert one energy form into another. A short list of examples follows:

- ATP hydrolysis (chemical energy in adenosine triphosphate → mechanical energy)
- Battery (electricity) (chemical energy → electrical energy)
- Electric generator (kinetic energy or mechanical work → electrical energy)
- Electric heater (electric energy → heat)
- Fire (chemical energy → heat and light)
- Friction (kinetic energy → heat)
- Fuel cell (chemical energy → electrical energy)
- Geothermal power (heat→ electrical energy)
- Heat engines, such as the internal combustion engine used in cars, or the steam engine (heat → mechanical energy)
- Hydroelectric dam (gravitational potential energy → electrical energy)
- Electric lamp (electrical energy → heat and light)
- Microphone (sound → electrical energy)
- Ocean thermal power (heat → electrical energy)
- Photosynthesis (electromagnetic radiation → chemical energy)
- Piezoelectrics (strain → electrical energy)
- Radio transmitters (electrical energy → electromagnetic wave energy)
- Thermoelectric (heat → electrical energy)
- Wave power (mechanical energy → electrical energy)
- Windmill (wind energy → electrical energy or mechanical energy)

== See also ==
- Chaos theory
- Conservation law
- Conservation of energy
- Conservation of mass
- Energy accounting
- Energy quality
- Groundwater energy balance
- Laws of thermodynamics
- Noether's theorem
- Ocean thermal energy conversion
- Thermodynamic equilibrium
- Thermoeconomics
- Uncertainty principle
