= Gup, Pakistan =

Gup
- Location within Pakistan
- Coordinates: 34.09°N 73.07°E
- Country: Pakistan
- Province: Khyber Pakhtunkhwa
- Elevation: 1,226 m (4,022 ft)
- Time zone: UTC+5 (PST)

Gup is a village in the Khyber Pakhtunkhwa province of Pakistan. It is located at 34°9'15N 73°6'50E with an altitude of 1226 metres (4025 feet). Neighbouring settlements include Jalalia, Khaliala and Saliot.
