= Saliot =

Salyot
- Village
- Salyot
- Location within Pakistan
- Coordinates: 34.09°N 73.07°E
- Country: Pakistan
- Province: Khyber Pakhtunkhwa
- Elevation: 1,137 m (3,730 ft)

Population
  - Estimate (Dec. 2019): 3,000
  - Density: 50/km^{2} (130/sq mi)
- Time zone: UTC+5 (PST)

Salyot is a village in UC Kuthiala, District Abbottabad, Khyber Pakhtunkhwa, Pakistan. It is located at 34°9'0N 73°7'0E with an altitude of 1137 metres (3733 feet). Neighbouring settlements include Bagwal Bandi, Bain Gojri and Shadial.
