= Energy flux =

Rate of transfer of energy through a surface

Energy flux is the rate of transfer of energy through a surface. The quantity is defined in two different ways, depending on the context:

1. Total rate of energy transfer (not per unit area); SI units: W = J⋅s^{−1}.
2. Specific rate of energy transfer (total normalized per unit area); SI units: W⋅m^{−2} = J⋅m^{−2}⋅s^{−1}:
  - This is a vector quantity, its components being determined in terms of the normal (perpendicular) direction to the surface of measurement.
  - This is sometimes called energy flux density, to distinguish it from the first definition.
  - Radiative flux, heat flux, and sound energy flux density (also sound intensity) are specific cases of this meaning.

== See also ==
- Energy flow (ecology)
- Flux
- Irradiance
- Poynting vector
- Stress–energy tensor
- Energy current
