= Baghati, Pakistan =

Baghati
- Location within Pakistan
- Coordinates: 34.08°N 73.08°E
- Country: Pakistan
- Province: Khyber Pakhtunkhwa
- Elevation: 1,306 m (4,285 ft)
- Time zone: UTC+5 (PST)

Baghati is a village of Abbottabad District in Khyber Pakhtunkhwa province of Pakistan. It is located at 34°8'0N 73°8'0E with an altitude of 1306 metres (4288 feet). Neighbouring settlements include Bain Gojri, Banseri and Sohlan.It consists of only one tribe Tanoli. This village is divided into two sub villages. Upper Baghati and lower Baghati.
