= Bagwal Bandi =

- Location within Pakistan
- Coordinates: 34.08°N 73.06°E
- Country: Pakistan
- Province: Khyber Pakhtunkhwa
- Elevation: 954 m (3,130 ft)
- Time zone: UTC+5 (PST)

Bagwal Bandi is a village of Abbottabad District in Khyber Pakhtunkhwa province of Pakistan. It is located at 34°8'10N 73°6'25E with an altitude of 954 metres (3133 feet). Neighbouring settlements include Baghdara, Shadial and Patian.
