= Electrical energy =

Energy related to forces on, and movement of, charged particles

Electrical energy is the energy transferred as electric charges move between points with different electric potential, that is, as they move across a potential difference. As electric potential is lost or gained, work is done changing the energy of some system. The amount of work in joules is given by the product of the charge that has moved, in coulombs, and the potential difference that has been crossed, in volts.

Electrical energy is usually sold by the kilowatt-hour (1 kW·h = 3.6 MJ) which is the product of the power in kilowatts multiplied by running time in hours. Electric utilities measure energy using an electricity meter, which keeps a running total of the electrical energy delivered to a customer.

Electric heating is an example of converting electrical energy into thermal energy. The simplest and most common type of electric heater uses electrical resistance to convert the energy. There are other ways to use electrical energy. Electric charges moves as a current the heater element which has a potential difference between the ends: energy is transferred from the charges to the element, increasing the element's temperature and thermal energy as the charges lose potential energy.

== Electricity generation ==
Electricity generation is the process of generating electrical energy from other forms of energy.

The fundamental principle of electricity generation was discovered during the 1820s and early 1830s by the British scientist Michael Faraday. His basic method is still used today: electric current is generated by the movement of a loop of wire, or disc of copper between the poles of a magnet.

For electrical utilities, it is the first step in the delivery of electricity to consumers. The other processes, electricity transmission, distribution, and electrical energy storage and recovery using pumped-storage methods are normally carried out by the electric power industry.

Electricity is most often generated at a power station by electromechanical generators, primarily driven by heat engines fueled by chemical combustion or nuclear fission but also by other means such as the kinetic energy of flowing water and wind. There are many other technologies that can be and are used to generate electricity such as solar photovoltaics and geothermal power.
