= Energy current =

Energy current is a flow of energy defined by the Poynting vector (E × H), as opposed to normal current (flow of charge). It was originally postulated by Oliver Heaviside. It is also an informal name for Energy flux.

== Explanation ==
"Energy current" is a somewhat informal term that is used, on occasion, to describe the process of energy transfer in situations where the transfer can usefully be viewed in terms of a flow. It is particularly used when the transfer of energy is more significant to the discussion than the process by which the energy is transferred. For instance, the flow of fuel oil in a pipeline could be considered as an energy current, although this would not be a convenient way of visualising the fullness of the storage tanks.

The units of energy current are those of power (W). This is closely related to energy flux, which is the energy transferred per unit area per unit time (measured in W/m^{2}).

== Energy current in electromagnetism ==
A specific use of the concept of energy current was promulgated by Oliver Heaviside in the last quarter of the 19th century. Against heavy resistance from the engineering community, Heaviside worked out the physics of signal velocity/impedance/distortion on telegraph, telephone, and undersea cables. He invented the inductor-loaded "distortionless line" later patented by Michael Pupin in the United States. Building on the concept of the Poynting vector, which describes the flow of energy in a transverse electromagnetic wave as the vector product of its electric and magnetic fields (E × H), Heaviside sought to extend this by treating the transfer of energy due to the electric current in a conductor in a similar manner. In doing so he reversed the contemporary view of current, so that the electric and magnetic fields due to the current are the "prime movers", rather than being a result of the motion of the charge in the conductor.

Heaviside's approach had some adherents at the time—enough, certainly, to quarrel with the "traditionalists" in print. However, the "energy current" view presented a number of difficulties, most notably that in asserting that the energy flowed in the electric and magnetic fields around the conductor the theory is unable to explain why the charge appears to flow in the conductor. Another major flaw is that electrical science and engineering are built on solutions of Maxwell's equations in which the electric current—expressed through the current-density vector J—is a fundamental quantity, while a so-called 'energy current' does not appear. Moreover, there are no equivalent equations describing the physical behaviour of the Poynting vector on which the concept of energy current is based.

After the discovery of the electron in 1897, the Drude model, which describes electrical conduction in metals, was developed very quickly. By associating the somewhat abstract concept of moving charge with the rather more concrete motion of the charged electrons, the Drude model effectively deals with the traditional "charge current" and the Heaviside "energy current" views simultaneously. With this achievement of "unification", the energy current approach has largely lost favour, because in omitting the concepts related to conduction it has no direct model for (for example) Ohm's law. In consequence it is less convenient to use than the "traditional" charge current approach, which defines the concepts of current, voltage, resistance, etc., as commonly used for electrical work.

Poynting-flow diagrams are part of E&M engineering, transmission line theory, and antenna design, but rare in electronics texts.
