= Patian =

- Location within Pakistan
- Coordinates: 34.07°N 73.05°E
- Country: Pakistan
- Province: Khyber Pakhtunkhwa
- Elevation: 958 m (3,143 ft)
- Time zone: UTC+5 (PST)

Patian is a village of Abbottabad District in Khyber Pakhtunkhwa province of Pakistan. It is located at 34°7'15N 73°5'55E with an altitude of 958 metres (3146 feet). Neighbouring settlements include Chamhad, Shadial and Bagwal Bandi
