= Generalized uncertainty principle =

Physics generalization

The generalized uncertainty principle (GUP) is a proposed extension of the Heisenberg uncertainty principle that incorporates potential effects of gravitational interactions into quantum mechanical systems. It emerges from several approaches to quantum gravity, including string theory, loop quantum gravity, and quantum geometry, and suggests the existence of a minimum measurable length, typically associated with the Planck scale.

A commonly used formulation of the GUP is:

$$\Delta x \Delta p \geq \frac{\hbar}{2} + \beta \Delta p^2$$,

where $\Delta x$ and $\Delta p$ represent the uncertainties in position and momentum, $\hbar$ is the reduced Planck constant, and $\beta$ is a parameter related to the minimal length scale. This modification implies that position measurements cannot be made with arbitrary precision, as there exists a fundamental lower bound to spatial resolution. The concept is motivated by the expectation that classical notions of spacetime may break down at extremely small scales, such as the Planck length.

Several forms of the GUP have been proposed in the literature, varying in mathematical structure and underlying theoretical assumptions, depending on the specific model of quantum gravity being considered.

== Observable consequences ==
The GUP's phenomenological and experimental implications have been examined across low- and high-energy contexts, encompassing atomic systems, quantum optical systems, gravitational bar detectors, gravitational decoherence, and macroscopic harmonic oscillators, further extending to composite particles, and astrophysical systems.
