= Thermal energy =

Energy that is measured by temperature

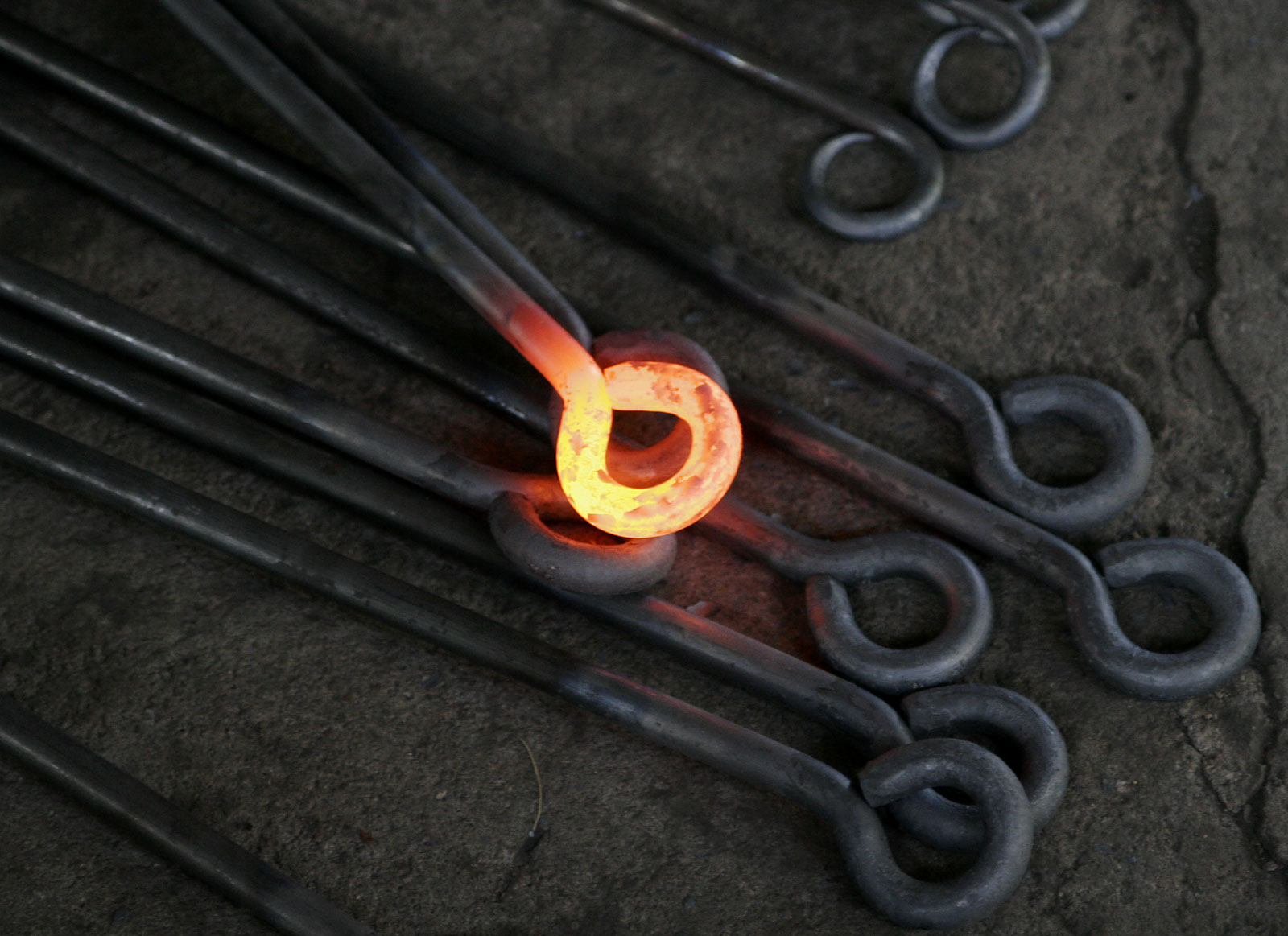
Thermal radiation in visible light can be seen on this hot metalwork, due to blackbody radiation.

The term "thermal energy" is often used ambiguously in physics and engineering. It can denote several different physical concepts, including:

- Internal energy: The energy contained within a body of matter or radiation, excluding the potential energy of the whole system.
- Heat: Energy in transfer between a system and its surroundings by mechanisms other than thermodynamic work and transfer of matter.
- The characteristic energy k_{B}T, where T denotes temperature and k_{B} denotes the Boltzmann constant; it is twice that associated with each degree of freedom.

Mark Zemansky (1970) has argued that the term "thermal energy" is best avoided due to its ambiguity. He suggests using more precise terms such as "internal energy" and "heat" to avoid confusion. The term is, however, used in some textbooks.

== Relation between heat and internal energy ==
In thermodynamics, heat is energy in transfer to or from a thermodynamic system by mechanisms other than thermodynamic work or transfer of matter, such as conduction, radiation, and friction. Heat refers to a quantity in transfer between systems, not to a property of any one system, or "contained" within it; on the other hand, internal energy and enthalpy are properties of a single system. Heat and work depend on the way in which an energy transfer occurs. In contrast, internal energy is a property of the state of a system and can thus be understood without knowing how the energy got there.

== Macroscopic thermal energy ==
In addition to the microscopic kinetic energies of its molecules, the internal energy of a body includes chemical energy belonging to distinct molecules, and the global joint potential energy involved in the interactions between molecules and suchlike. Thermal energy may be viewed as contributing to internal energy or to enthalpy.

=== Chemical internal energy ===
The internal energy of a body can change in a process in which chemical potential energy is converted into non-chemical energy. In such a process, the thermodynamic system can change its internal energy by doing work on its surroundings, or by gaining or losing energy as heat. It is not quite clear to merely say that "the converted chemical potential energy has simply become internal energy". It is, however, sometimes convenient to say, "the chemical potential energy has been converted into thermal energy". This is expressed in ordinary traditional language by talking of 'heat of reaction'.

=== Potential energy of internal interactions ===
In a body of material, especially in condensed matter, such as a liquid or a solid, in which the constituent particles, such as molecules or ions, interact strongly with one another, the energies of such interactions contribute strongly to the internal energy of the body. Still, they are not immediately apparent in the kinetic energies of molecules, as manifest in temperature. Such energies of interaction may be thought of as contributions to the global internal microscopic potential energies of the body.

== Microscopic thermal energy ==
In a statistical mechanical account of an ideal gas, in which the molecules move independently between instantaneous collisions, the internal energy is just the sum total of the gas's independent particles' kinetic energies, and it is this kinetic motion that is the source and the effect of the transfer of heat across a system's boundary. For a gas that does not have particle interactions except for instantaneous collisions, the term "thermal energy" is effectively synonymous with "internal energy".

In many statistical physics texts, "thermal energy" refers to $kT$, the product of the Boltzmann constant and the absolute temperature, also written as $k_\text{B} T$.

== Thermal current density ==
When there is no accompanying flow of matter, the term "thermal energy" is also applied to the energy carried by a heat flow.

== See also ==
- Geothermal energy
- Geothermal heating
- Geothermal power
- Heat transfer
- Ocean thermal energy conversion
- Orders of magnitude (temperature)
- Thermal energy storage
