= Jalalia, Abbottabad =

Jalalia
- Location within Pakistan
- Coordinates: 34.08°N 73.06°E
- Country: Pakistan
- Province: Khyber Pakhtunkhwa
- Elevation: 919 m (3,015 ft)
- Time zone: UTC+5 (PST)

Jalalia is a town in Abbottabad District of Khyber Pakhtunkhwa province of Pakistan. It is located at 34°8'45N 73°6'10E with an altitude of 919 metres (3018 feet).
