= Chemical energy =

Energy released from chemical substances

Chemical energy is the energy of chemical substances that is released when the substances undergo a chemical reaction and transform into other substances. Some examples of storage media of chemical energy include batteries, food, and gasoline (as well as oxygen gas, which is of high chemical energy due to its relatively weak double bond and indispensable for chemical-energy release in gasoline combustion). Breaking and re-making chemical bonds involves energy, which may be either absorbed by or evolved from a chemical system. If reactants with relatively weak electron-pair bonds convert to more strongly bonded products, energy is released. Therefore, relatively weakly bonded and unstable molecules store chemical energy.

Energy that can be released or absorbed because of a reaction between chemical substances is equal to the difference between the energy content of the products and the reactants, if the initial and final temperature is the same. This change in energy can be estimated from the bond energies of the reactants and products. It can also be calculated from $\Delta {U_f^\circ}_{\mathrm {reactants}}$, the internal energy of formation of the reactant molecules, and $\Delta {U_f^\circ}_{\mathrm {products}}$, the internal energy of formation of the product molecules. The internal energy change of a chemical process is equal to the heat exchanged if it is measured under conditions of constant volume and equal initial and final temperature, as in a closed container such as a bomb calorimeter. However, under conditions of constant pressure, as in reactions in vessels open to the atmosphere, the measured heat change is not always equal to the internal energy change, because pressure-volume work also releases or absorbs energy. (The heat change at constant pressure is equal to the enthalpy change, in this case the enthalpy of reaction, if initial and final temperatures are equal).

A related term is the heat of combustion, which is the energy mostly of the weak double bonds of molecular oxygen released due to a combustion reaction and often applied in the study of fuels. Food is similar to hydrocarbon and carbohydrate fuels, and when it is oxidized to carbon dioxide and water, the energy released is analogous to the heat of combustion (though assessed differently than for a hydrocarbon fuel—see food energy).

Chemical potential energy is a form of potential energy related to the structural arrangement of atoms or molecules. This arrangement may be the result of chemical bonds within a molecule or interactions between them. Chemical energy of a chemical substance can be transformed to other forms of energy by a chemical reaction. For example, when a fuel is burned, the chemical energy of molecular oxygen and the fuel is converted to heat. Green plants transform solar energy to chemical energy (mostly of oxygen) through the process of photosynthesis, and electrical energy can be converted to chemical energy and vice versa through electrochemical reactions.

The similar term chemical potential is used to indicate the potential of a substance to undergo a change of configuration, be it in the form of a chemical reaction, spatial transport, particle exchange with a reservoir, etc. It is not a form of potential energy itself, but is more closely related to free energy. The confusion in terminology arises from the fact that in other areas of physics not dominated by entropy, all potential energy is available to do useful work and drives the system to spontaneously undergo changes of configuration, and thus there is no distinction between "free" and "non-free" potential energy (hence the one word "potential"). However, in systems of large entropy such as chemical systems, the total amount of energy present (and conserved according to the first law of thermodynamics) of which this chemical potential energy is a part, is separated from the amount of that energy—thermodynamic free energy (from which chemical potential is derived)—which (appears to) drive the system forward spontaneously as the global entropy increases (in accordance with the second law).
