= Shadial =

- Location within Pakistan
- Coordinates: 34.08°N 73.07°E
- Country: Pakistan
- Province: Khyber Pakhtunkhwa
- Elevation: 1,093 m (3,586 ft)
- Time zone: UTC+5 (PST)

Shadial is a village of Abbottabad District in Khyber Pakhtunkhwa province of Pakistan. It is located at 34°8'0N 73°7'0E with an altitude of 1093 metres (3589 feet).
