= Energy accidents =

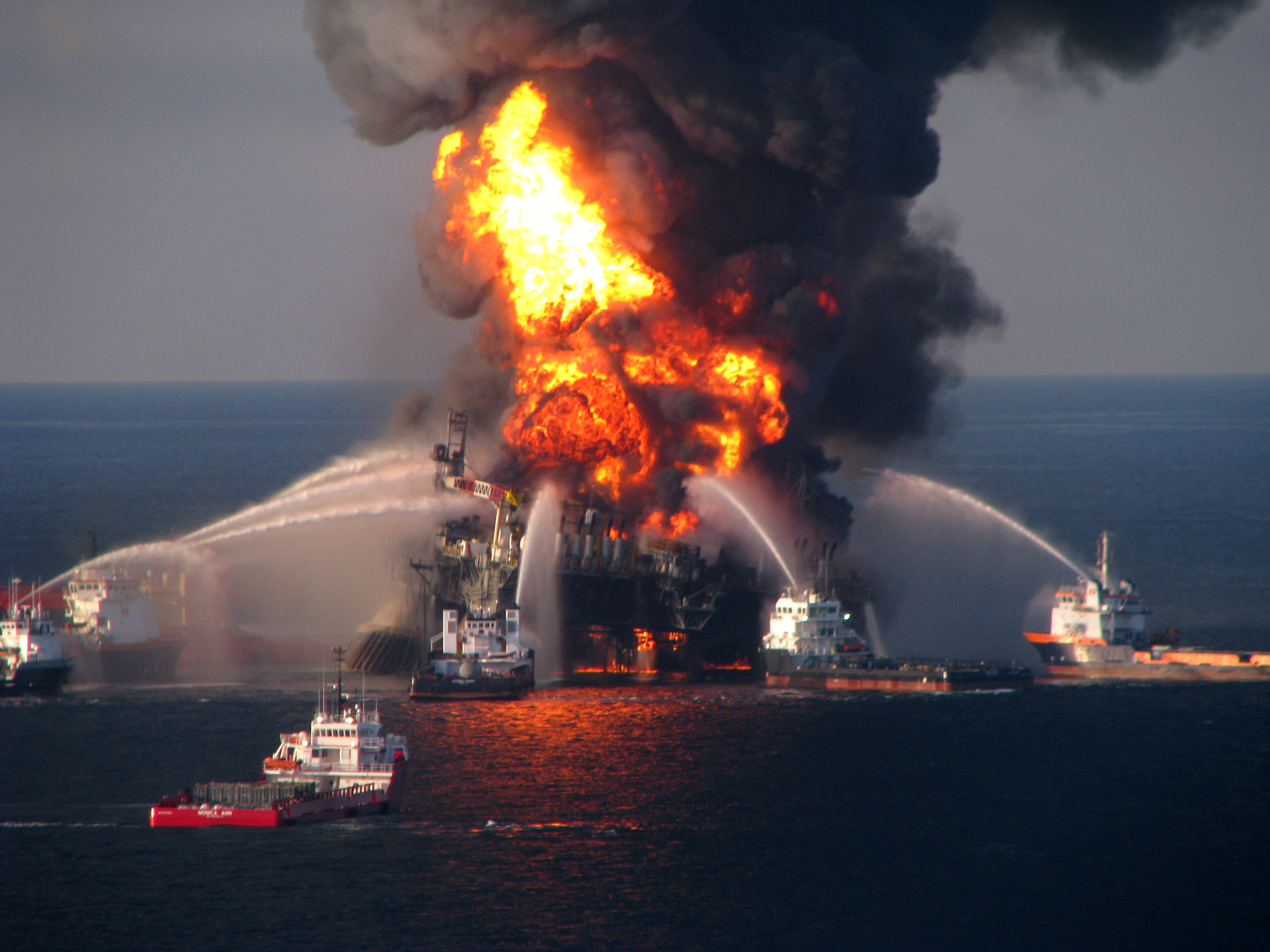
Deepwater Horizon oil spill discharges 4.9 million barrels. (2010)

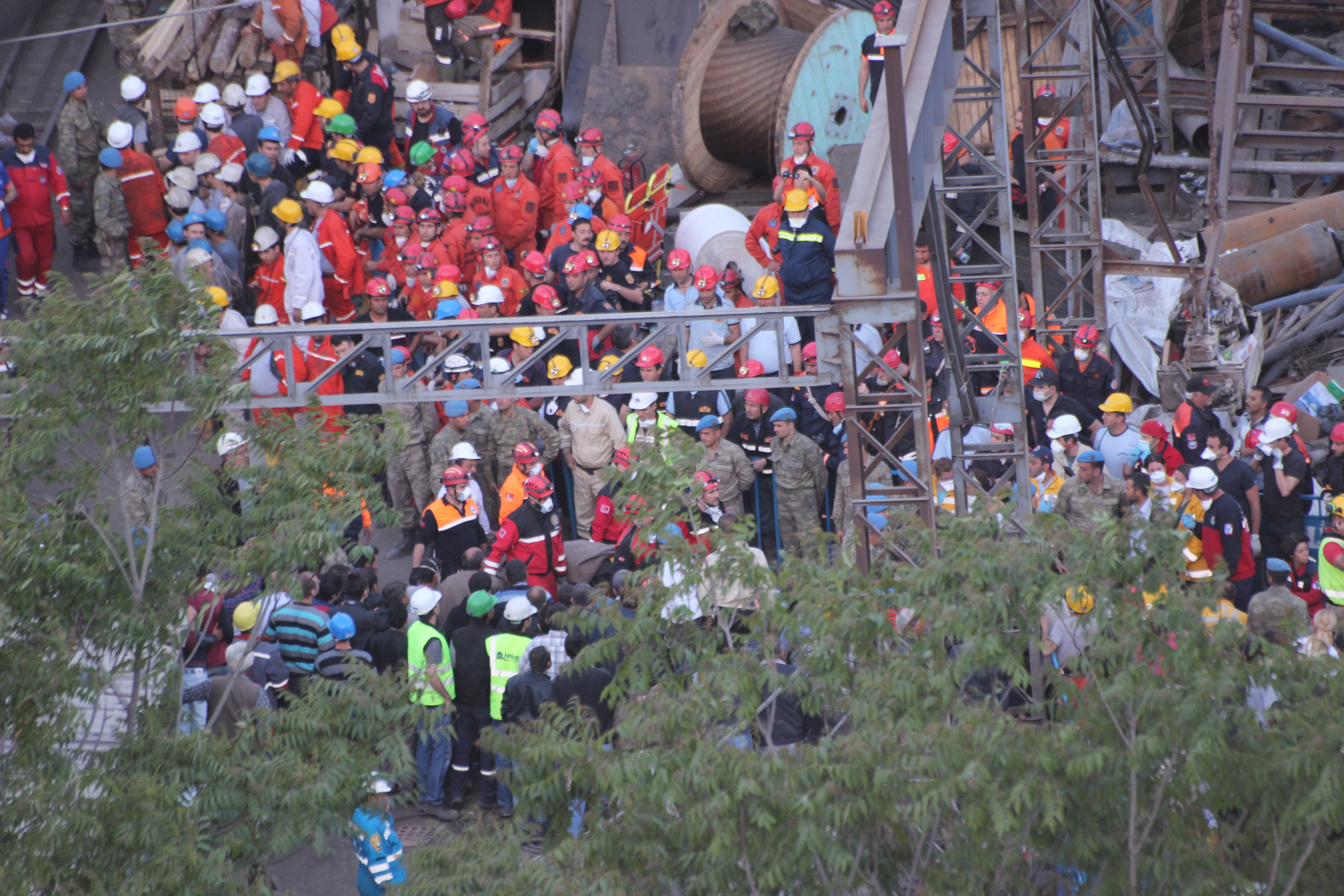
Rescue effort after the 2014 Soma mine disaster in Manisa, Turkey, where over 300 miners lost their lives.

Energy resources bring with them great social and economic promise, providing financial growth for communities and energy services for local economies. However, the infrastructure which delivers energy services can break down in an energy accident, sometimes causing considerable damage. Energy fatalities can occur, and with many systems deaths will happen often, even when the systems are working as intended.

Historically, coal mining has been the most dangerous energy activity and the list of historical coal mining disasters is a long one. Underground mining hazards include suffocation, gas poisoning, roof collapse and gas explosions. Open cut mining hazards are principally mine wall failures and vehicle collisions. In the US alone, more than 100,000 coal miners have been killed in accidents over the past century, with more than 3,200 dying in 1907 alone.

According to Benjamin K. Sovacool, 279 major energy accidents occurred from 1907 to 2007 and they caused 182,156 deaths with $41 billion in property damages, with these figures not including deaths from smaller accidents.

However, by far the greatest energy fatalities as a result of energy generation by humanity are due to air pollution, primarily generated from the burning of fossil fuels and biomass. Particulate matter (counting outdoor air pollution effects only) is estimated to cause 2.1 to 4.21 million deaths annually.

== Fatalities ==
Hypothetical number of global deaths which would have resulted from energy production if the world's energy production was met through a single source, in 2014.

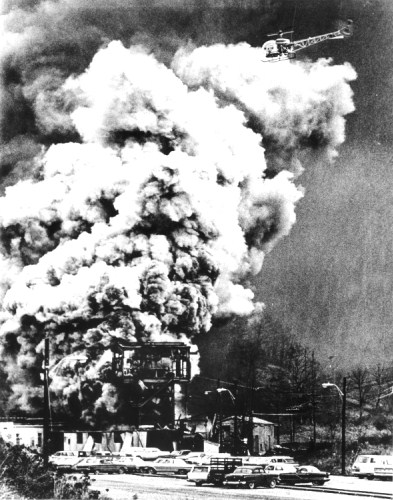
The Farmington coal mine disaster kills 78. West Virginia, US, 1968.

According to Benjamin K. Sovacool, while responsible for less than 1 percent of the total number of energy accidents, hydroelectric facilities claimed 94 percent of reported immediate fatalities. Results on immediate fatalities are dominated by one disaster in which Typhoon Nina in 1975 washed out the Shimantan Dam (Henan Province, China) and 171,000 people perished. The other major accident that involved greater than 1000 immediate deaths followed the rupture of the NNPC petroleum pipeline in 1998 and the resulting explosion. The other singular accident described by Sovacool is the predicted latent death toll of greater than 1000, as a result of the 1986 steam explosion at the Chernobyl nuclear reactor in Ukraine. With approximately 4000 deaths in total, to eventually result in the decades ahead due to the radio-isotope pollution released.

In the oil and gas industry, the need for improved safety culture and training within companies is evidenced by the finding that workers new to a company are more likely to be involved in fatalities.

Coal mining accidents resulted in 5,938 immediate deaths in 2005, and 4746 immediate deaths in 2006 in China alone according to the World Wildlife Fund. Coal mining is the most dangerous occupation in China, the death rate for every 100 tons of coal mined is 100 times that of the death rate in the US and 30 times that achieved in South Africa. Moreover, 600,000 Chinese coal miners, as of 2004, were suffering from Coalworker's pneumoconiosis (known as "black lung") a disease of the lungs caused by long-continued inhalation of coal dust. And the figure increases by 70,000 miners every year in China.

Historically, coal mining has been a very dangerous activity and the list of historical coal mining disasters is a long one. In the US alone, more than 100,000 coal miners were killed in accidents over the past century, with more than 3,200 dying in 1907 alone. In the decades following this peak, an annual death toll of 1,500 miner fatalities occurred every year in the US until approximately the 1970s. Coal mining fatalities in the US between 1990 and 2012 have continued to decline, with fewer than 100 each year. (See more Coal mining disasters in the United States)

In the United States, in the 2000s, after three decades of regulation on the Environmental impact of the coal industry, including regulations in the 1970s and 1990s from the Clean Air Act, an act created to cut down on pollution related deaths from fossil fuel usage, US coal fired power plants were estimated, in the 2000s, to continue to cause between 10,000 and 30,000 latent, or air pollution related deaths per year, due to the emissions of sulfur dioxide, nitrogen oxides and directly emitted particulate matter that result when coal is burnt.

According to the World Health Organization in 2012, urban outdoor air pollution, from the burning of fossil fuels and biomass is estimated to cause 3 million deaths worldwide per year and indoor air pollution from biomass and fossil fuel burning is estimated to cause approximately 4.3 million premature deaths. In 2013, a team of researchers estimated the number of premature deaths caused by particulate matter in outdoor air pollution as 2.1 million, occurring annually.

== Economic costs ==
According to Benjamin Sovacool, nuclear power plants rank first in terms of their economic cost, accounting for 41 percent of all property damage. Oil and hydroelectric follow at around 25 percent each, followed by natural gas at 9 percent and coal at 2 percent. Excluding Chernobyl and the Shimantan Dam, the three other most expensive accidents involved the Exxon Valdez oil spill (Alaska), The Prestige oil spill (Spain), and the Three Mile Island nuclear accident (Pennsylvania). However analysis presented in the international Journal, Human and Ecological Risk Assessment found that coal, oil, Liquid petroleum gas and hydro accidents have cost more than nuclear power accidents.

Modern-day U.S. regulatory agencies frequently implement regulations on conventional pollution if one life or more is predicted saved per $6 million to $8 million of economic costs incurred.

== Selected energy accidents ==
- April 26, 1942: A coal-dust explosion at Benxihu Colliery in Japanese occupied China killed 1,549 making it the worst disaster in the history of coal mining superseding the 1,099 death toll of the Courrières mine disaster in 1906 and the second worst recorded energy accident, in terms of lives lost on a single day, after Banqiao dam in 1975. Despite the 1943 disaster on the hydroelectric Möhne Reservoir in the infamous dambusters raid killing 1,579 and thus would technically put it in second place, however as that was a deliberate act of war, it may not be included as an "accident" under the strictest use of the term.
- December 1952: The Great Smog of London caused by the burning of coal, and to a lesser extent wood, killed 12,000 people within days to months due to inhalation of the smog.
- May 1962: The Centralia, Pennsylvania coal mine fire began, causing the destruction of a highway and forcing the gradual evacuation of the Centralia borough, it is now a ghost town. The fire continues to burn in the abandoned borough.
- October 1963: A gas explosion at the Indianapolis Coliseum (now known as the Pepsi Coliseum) occurred during the opening night for the Holiday on Ice show, killing 74 and injuring nearly 400.
- October 1963: The Vajont Dam in Italy overflew. Filling the reservoir caused geological failure in valley wall, leading to 110 km/h landslide into the lake; water escaped in a wave over the top of dam. Valley had been incorrectly assessed as stable. Several villages were completely wiped out, with an estimated between 1,900 and 2,500 deaths.
- March 1967: The Torrey Canyon supertanker was shipwrecked off the west coast of Cornwall, England, causing an environmental disaster. This was the first major oil spill at sea.
- August 1975: The Banqiao Dam flooded in the Henan Province of China due to heavy rains and poor construction quality of the dam, which was built during Great Leap Forward. The flood immediately killed over 100,000 people, and another 150,000 died of subsequent epidemic diseases and famine, bringing the total death toll to around 250,000—making it the worst technical disaster ever. In addition, about 5,960,000 buildings collapsed, and 11 million residents were made homeless.
- March 16, 1978: The Amoco Cadiz, a VLCC owned by the company Amoco (now merged with BP) sank near the Northwest coasts of France, resulting in the spilling of 68,684,000 US Gallons of crude oil (1,635,000 barrels). This is the largest oil spill of its kind (spill from an oil tanker) in history.
- January 8, 1979: Betelgeuse incident, a French constructed oil tanker which entered Bantry Bay, Ireland, exploded and killed 50 people, the disaster also caused extensive harbor damage.
- March 28, 1979: Three Mile Island accident. Partial nuclear meltdown. Mechanical failures in the non-nuclear secondary system, followed by a stuck-open pilot-operated relief valve (PORV) in the primary system, allowed large amounts of reactor coolant to escape. Plant operators initially failed to recognize the loss of coolant, resulting in a partial meltdown. The reactor was brought under control but not before radioactive gases were released into the atmosphere. The accident has not been directly linked with a single death.
- June 3, 1979: Ixtoc I oil spill. The Ixtoc I exploratory oil well suffered a blowout resulting in the third largest oil spill and the second largest accidental spill in history.
- November 20, 1980: A Texaco oil rig drilled into a salt mine transforming the Lake Peigneur, a freshwater lake before the accident, into a salt water lake.
- February 15, 1982: The mobile offshore oil rig Ocean Ranger is struck by a rogue wave off the coast of Newfoundland, Canada and sinks with the loss of all 84 crew.
- July 23, 1984: Romeoville, Illinois, Union Oil refinery explosion killed 19 people.
- November 19, 1984: San Juanico Disaster, an explosion at a liquid petroleum gas tank farm killed hundreds and injured thousands in San Juanico, Mexico.
- April 26, 1986: Chernobyl disaster. At the Chernobyl Nuclear Power Plant in Prypiat, Ukraine a test on reactor number four goes out of control, resulting in a power excursion. The ensuing steam explosion, fire and radio-isotope releases killed approximately 31 to 50 first responders, with most of those exposed to radiation only, dying with acute radiation syndrome within weeks to months after the accident. Future, total death toll predictions, state that there may be a total of between 4,000 and 25,000 cancer deaths in the years to decades ahead due to radiation induced cancers, with the large discrepancy in the predictions created by various authoritative agencies employing different risk models. The 30 kilometer Chernobyl Exclusion Zone, covering portions of Belarus and Ukraine surrounding Prypiat, remains contaminated and mostly uninhabited. Prypiat itself was totally evacuated and remains as a partial ghost town, open only for tourists and tours.
- May 5, 1988: Norco, Louisiana, Shell Oil refinery explosion after hydrocarbon gas escaped from a corroded pipe in a catalytic cracker and was ignited. Louisiana state police evacuated 2,800 residents from nearby neighborhoods. Seven workers were killed and 42 injured. The total cost arising from the Norco blast is estimated at US$706 million.
- July 6, 1988: Piper Alpha disaster. An explosion and resulting fire on a North Sea oil production platform kills 167 men. Total insured loss is about US$3.4 billion. To date it is rated as the world's worst offshore oil disaster in terms both of lives lost and impact to industry.
- March 24, 1989: Exxon Valdez oil spill. The Exxon Valdez, an oil tanker bound for Long Beach, California, hits Prince William Sound's Bligh Reef dumping an estimated minimum 10.8 million US gallons (40.9 million litres, or 250,000 barrels) of crude oil into the sea. It is considered to be one of the most devastating human-caused environmental disasters ever to occur in history. 100,000 to as many as 250,000 seabirds died as well as at least 2,800 sea otters, approximately 12 river otters, 300 harbor seals, 247 bald eagles, and 22 orcas, and billions of salmon and herring eggs were destroyed. Overall reductions in population have been seen in various ocean animals, including stunted growth in pink salmon populations. Sea otters and ducks also showed higher death rate in following years, partially because they ingested prey from contaminated soil and from ingestion of oil residues on hair due to grooming. The effects of the spill continue to be felt 20 years later.
- June 4, 1989: The Ufa train disaster was a railway accident that occurred on 4 June 1989, in Iglinsky District, Bashkir ASSR, Soviet Union, when an explosion killed 575 people and injured 800 more. The explosion was caused by a faulty pipeline transporting natural gas.
- April 22, 1992: 1992 Guadalajara explosions in the downtown district of Analco Mexico. Numerous gasoline explosions in the sewer system over four hours destroyed 8 kilometres (5.0 mi) of streets. According to the Lloyd's of London accounting firm, 252 people were killed, nearly 500 injured and 15,000 were left homeless. The estimated monetary damage ranges between $300 million to $1 billion.
- 1992: A Gas explosion in a Turkish coal mine kills 263 workers near the Black Sea port of Zonguldak.
- September 25, 1998: The Esso Longford gas explosion in Australia kills 2 and injures 8.
- June 10, 1999: The Olympic Pipeline Explosion in Bellingham, Washington, USA kills three when a pipeline carrying gasoline ruptures, spilling 277,000 gallons into a creek, which then ignited.
- December 22, 1999: A gas explosion in Larkhall in Lanarkshire, south east of Glasgow Scotland, kills a family of 4.
- November 5, 2000: The road Ibadan tanker truck explosion kills 100–200 when the petrol/gasoline tanker collides with a traffic jam and bursts into flames.
- June 2002: A coal mine explosion kills 111 to 124 in Heilongjiang province, China. Coal mining fatalities in China are under-reported.
- June 20, 2003: A gas explosion at a Koranic school dormitory in Kayseri, Turkey, kills 8 and injuries 2.
- October 16, 2003 "Derrybrien wind farm", Ireland's largest wind turbine construction project at the time, on top of a hill, with an underlying layer of peat bog. Resulted in the triggering of a peat avalanche, and thereby the pollution of a nearby lake, contaminating the water supply of a town and the death of an estimated 50,000 fish, with peat related carbon dioxide releases.
- February 18, 2004 The Nishapur train disaster occurred in Iran, caused by fossil fuel cargo containers catching fire, then igniting other combustibles, which finally exploded, it resulted in ~300 killed and the destruction of the entire village of Khayyam by blast and fire.
- March 16, 2004: The Arkhangelsk explosion of 2004 was a gas explosion that killed 58 in an apartment building in the Russian city of Arkhangelsk.
- May 11, 2004: The Stockline Plastics factory explosion was a LPG gas explosion that killed 9 & injured 33, it also destroyed the 4 story factory.
- March 23, 2005: Texas City refinery explosion. An explosion occurred at a BP refinery in Texas City, Texas. At the time, it was the fourth largest refinery in the United States and one of the largest in the world, processing 437,000 barrels of crude oil per day and accounting for 2.5% of that nation's gasoline supply. The injured were 180, and 15 people were confirmed dead, including employees of Jacobs Engineering and the Fluor Corporation as well as BP. BP has since accepted that its employees contributed to the accident. Several level indicators failed, leading to overfilling of a blowdown drum, and light hydrocarbons concentrated at ground level throughout the area. A nearby running diesel truck set off the explosion.
- July 11, 2005: A gas explosion kills 19 and injuries 17 people at a shopping centre in the northern Russian town of Ukhta.
- December 11, 2005: Hertfordshire Oil Storage Terminal fire. A series of explosions at the Buncefield oil storage depot, described as the largest peacetime explosion in Europe, devastated the terminal and many surrounding properties. There were no fatalities. Total damages have been forecast as £750 million.
- January 2, 2006:The Sago mine disaster caused by a coal mine explosion kills 12 in the US, the worst such accident since 2001 in the US.
- March 19, 2007 No less than 75 miners died with at least 43 missing after a methane gas explosion at the Ulyanovskaya coal mine in the Kemerovo region of Siberia.
- July 18, 2007 The 2007 New York City steam explosion occurred, resulting in ~50 injuries, 2 critical, and ~30 million dollars of lost revenue for the cities businesses.
- June 29, 2009 Viareggio train derailment, a train carrying Liquefied Petroleum Gas(LPG) derailed with the LPG containers exploding. 32 people died, 26 people were injured, 100 people left homeless.
- '17 August 2009: The 2009 Sayano–Shushenskaya power station accident at the Russian hydroelectric station occurred when turbine 2 broke free and shot-up violently. The turbine hall then flooded as a result of the hole where the turbine previously seated and the ceiling of the hall collapsed with 75 people killed along with a 1–2 billion dollar cleanup of the site and 400 tons of trout killed due to transformer oil being release.
- 29 October 2009: Jaipur (Indian Oil) Fire killed 12 people and injuring 300, with 500,000 people evacuated, the first explosion shattered window glass 3 km away.
- November 23, 2009: 2009 Heilongjiang mine explosion A gas explosion killed 108 and hospitalized another 29 people in a coal mine in Heilongjiang province China.
- 2010: A gas explosion at a Turkish coal mine kills 30.
- February 7, 2010: 2010 Connecticut power plant explosion. A large explosion occurred at a Kleen Energy Systems 620-megawatt, Siemens combined cycle gas- and oil- fired power plant in Middletown, Connecticut, United States. Preliminary reports attributed the cause of the explosion to a test of the plant's energy systems. The plant was still under construction and scheduled to start supplying energy in June 2010. The number of injuries was eventually established to be 27. Five people died in the explosion.
- April 20, 2010: Deepwater Horizon oil spill in the Gulf of Mexico. 11 oil platform workers died in a natural gas blow out explosion and fire, following the sinking of the oil platform the accident resulted in a massive oil spill in the Gulf of Mexico, considered the largest offshore spill in U.S. history. According to the Committee on the Analysis of Causes of the Deepwater Horizon Explosion, poor safety culture was largely to blame for the accident.
- September 9, 2010: The 2010 San Bruno pipeline explosion occurred in a suburb of San Francisco killing 8 and produced a ball of fire 1,000 foot high due to the rupture of the natural gas pipeline.
- November 3, 2010: A gas explosion destroyed four houses and injured 15 people, in Merlin Road, Salford, Greater Manchester, England.
- November 15, 2010: A gas explosion in the Grand Riviera Princess hotel in the Mexican resort of Playa del Carmen kills 7 and injuries 18.
- December 19, 2010: 2010 Puebla oil pipeline explosion. A large oil pipeline explosion that occurred at 5:50 am CST in the city of San Martín Texmelucan de Labastida, Puebla, Mexico. The pipeline, running from Tabasco to Hidalgo, was owned by the Pemex petroleum company, and exploded after thieves from the Los Zetas drug cartel attempted to siphon off the oil. The gas explosion and resulting oil fire killed 29 people, including thirteen children, and injured 52. Some of the flames in the fire became ten metres high, and the smoke towered over the city.
- March 2011: Cosmo Oil Refinery Fire: The Cosmo Oil Company's refinery in Japan's Ichihara, Chiba Prefecture, caught fire during the 2011 Tōhoku earthquake. As it raged, several pressurized liquified propane gas storage tanks exploded into massive fireballs, the largest over Japan since Nagasaki in World War II.
- March 2011: Fukushima I nuclear accidents in Japan. Regarded as the second largest nuclear disaster in history, after the Chernobyl disaster, there have been no direct deaths attributed to radiation at or around the Fukushima power station but a few of the plant's workers were injured or killed by the disaster conditions resulting from the earthquake and tsunami that struck the power plant which precipitated the accident. The estimated future cancer burden is a total of 180 cases in the years and decades ahead. As of 2013, 160,000 evacuees are still living in temporary housing. The difficult cleanup job will take 40 or more years, and cost tens of billions of dollars.
- March 21, 2011 A coal mine explosion in Sorange Pakistan kills 45.
- April 2011 A road fuel tanker overturns when stopping at a checkpoint in central Nigeria, sparking a fire in which some 50 people were killed.
- July 12, 2012 Okobie road tanker explosion, a road tanker carrying petrol/gasoline crashes then explodes killing 121 spectators and injuring at least 75 more.
- October 29, 2012: Hurricane Sandy caused a ConEdison power plant to explode, causing a blackout in most of Midtown Manhattan. The blue light emitted from the arc made places as far as Brooklyn glow. No person was killed or injured.
- February 11, 2013 An underground methane gas explosion killed 18 miners at the Vorkutinskaya coal pit in northern Russia.
- April 5, 2013 A gas well blowout kills 2 and injuries 2 others in Texas USA.
- April 28, 2013: A gas explosion demolishes a five-story residential building in Reims France, killing no less than 3 people and injuring 14.
- July 6, 2013: Lac-Mégantic rail disaster 63 cars of a 72-car train carrying crude oil derailed, causing fire and explosions in downtown Lac-Mégantic, Quebec Canada. 47 people were killed and 30 buildings were destroyed.
- 13 May 2014 The Soma coal mine disaster was an explosion at a coal mine in Turkey that killed ~301 and trapped a further 600 underground.
- 31 July 2014 The 2014 Kaohsiung gas explosions occurring in a Kaohsiung City city street in Taiwan, it killed 30 and injured 309 while destroying 1.5 km of road and damaging 1,500 business stores.

== See also ==
- Coal-seam fires burn for decades and are virtually inextinguishable
- Dam failure
- List of accidents and disasters by death toll
- List of coal mining accidents in China
- List of environmental accidents in the fossil fuel industry in Australia
- List of hydroelectric power station failures
- List of oil spills
- Lists of disasters
- Lists of nuclear disasters and radioactive incidents
- Common cause and special cause (statistics) § Common mode failure in engineering
- U.S. Chemical Safety and Hazard Investigation Board

=== Specific events ===
- Deepwater Horizon oil spill and natural gas explosion of 2010
- Effects of the Chernobyl disaster
- Fukushima Daiichi nuclear disaster
- Great Smog of London, up to 12,000 people died in 1952
- Kingston Fossil Plant coal fly ash slurry spill December 2008
