= List of Hampshire College people =

The following is a list of individuals associated with Hampshire College through attending as a student, or serving as a member of the faculty or staff. Some names appear in multiple sections.

== Notable alumni ==
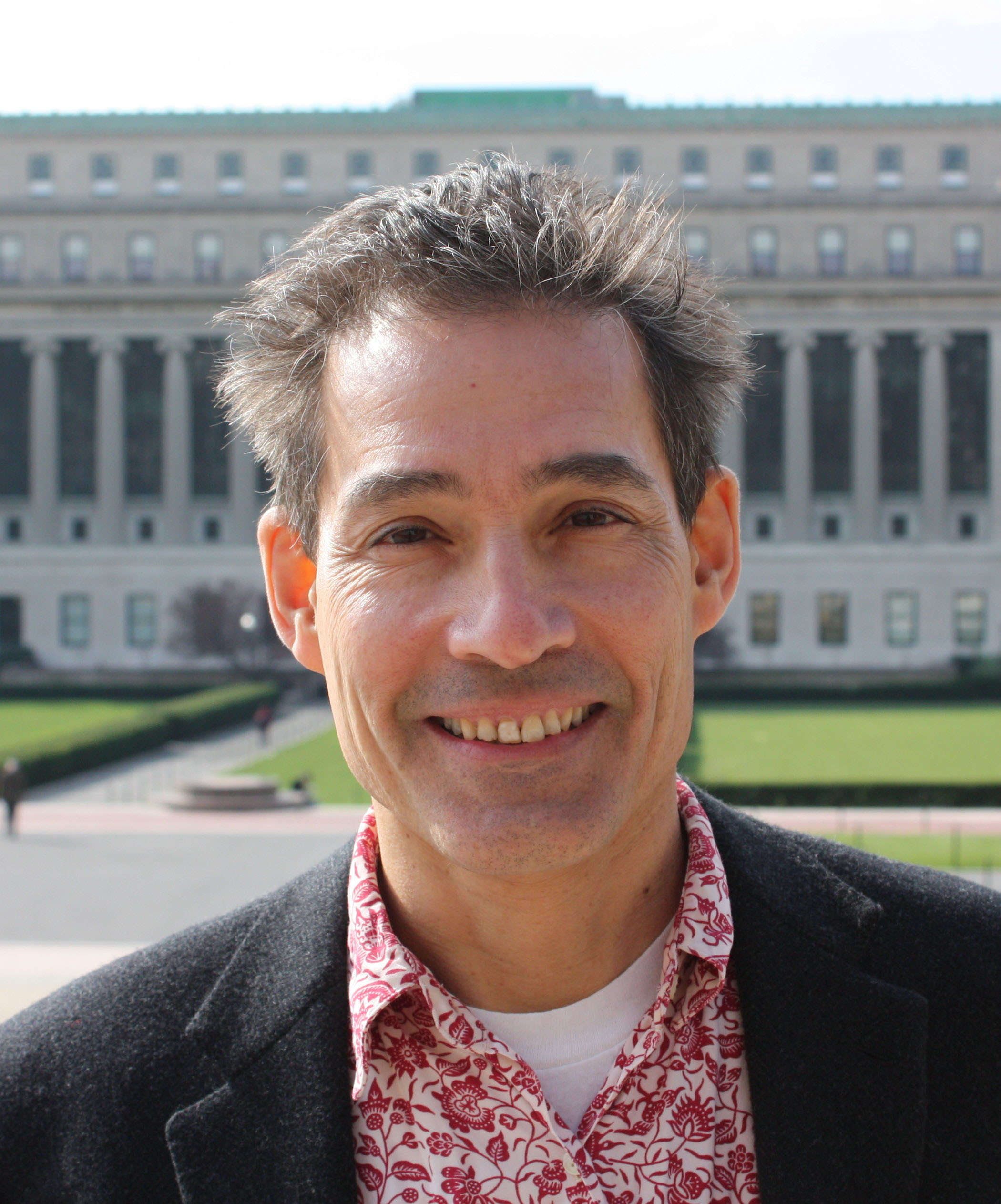
Psychologist George Bonanno

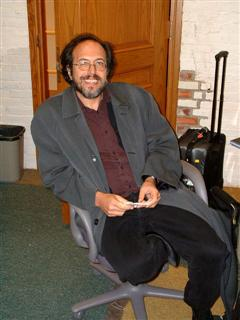
Theoretical physicist Lee Smolin

=== Academia ===
- Alba Arikha, writer, lecturer on creative writing at the University of Hertfordshire and Columbia University
- Sylvia Bashevkin, Canadian academic and feminist at the University of Toronto, former Principal of University College, Toronto
- George Bonanno, psychologist, Columbia University
- Derek Booth, geologist and heir presumptive to the Booth baronetcy, University of Washington
- Heather Boushey, economist, president of the Washington Center for Equitable Growth think tank
- Geoffrey Bove, chiropractor, neurobiologist and anatomist, professor at Harvard Medical School, Odense University, and University of New England
- Cynthia Cattell, space physicist and professor in the School of Physics and Astronomy at University of Minnesota
- Hasok Chang, historian and philosopher of science, University of Cambridge
- Christopher Dick, professor in the department of Ecology and Evolutionary Biology, University of Michigan
- Barry Marc Cohen, art therapist, Diagnostic Drawing Series
- Phyllis Coley, biologist, University of Utah
- Concetta DiRusso, biochemist, University of Nebraska–Lincoln
- Paige Fischer, environmental scientist, University of Michigan
- Vanessa Northington Gamble, physician, professor of medical humanities at George Washington University, chair of the Tuskegee Syphilis Study Legacy Committee
- Raymond W. Gibbs Jr., psychologist and psycholinguist, University of California, Santa Cruz
- Nancy Grimm, ecologist, Arizona State University
- Marcia Groszek, mathematician, Dartmouth College
- Gail Hershatter, historian of Modern China at the University of California, Santa Cruz and Williams College, Guggenheim Fellow
- Benjamin Mako Hill, technologist, software developer and founding member of Ubuntu and Debian projects, assistant professor in Communication at the University of Washington
- Sean Hill, neuroscientist, University of Toronto
- Tom Hull, mathematician and professor, Western New England University
- Mary James, physicist, Reed College, University of Maryland, College Park
- Caren Kaplan, feminist theorist, professor of American studies at University of California at Davis, University of California at Berkeley, Georgetown University
- Patricia Klindienst, writer and scholar, American Book Award recipient, Yale University
- Lucy-Ann McFadden, astronomer and planetary scientist for NASA, founder of the Science, Discovery & the Universe Program at the University of Maryland
- Jacob Reider, National Coordinator for Health Information Technology
- G. Philip Robertson, biologist, Michigan State University
- David Schimel, research scientist at NASA's Jet Propulsion Lab, California Institute of Technology; Nobel Peace Prize laureate
- Timothy Shary, film scholar, University of Massachusetts Amherst, Clark University
- Lee Smolin, theoretical physicist at the Perimeter Institute, University of Waterloo and University of Toronto, author of The Trouble with Physics
- Eric Steig, glaciologist and geochemist, professor of Earth and Space Sciences at the University of Washington; Guggenheim Fellow
- Paul W. Sternberg, biologist, California Institute of Technology
- Alex S. Vitale, sociologist at Brooklyn College, author of The End of Policing (2017)
- William H. Warren, psychologist, Chancellor's Professor at Brown University
- Timothy Wilson, Sherrell J. Aston Professor of Psychology, University of Virginia
- Christopher Young, composer, professor of music at the University of Southern California

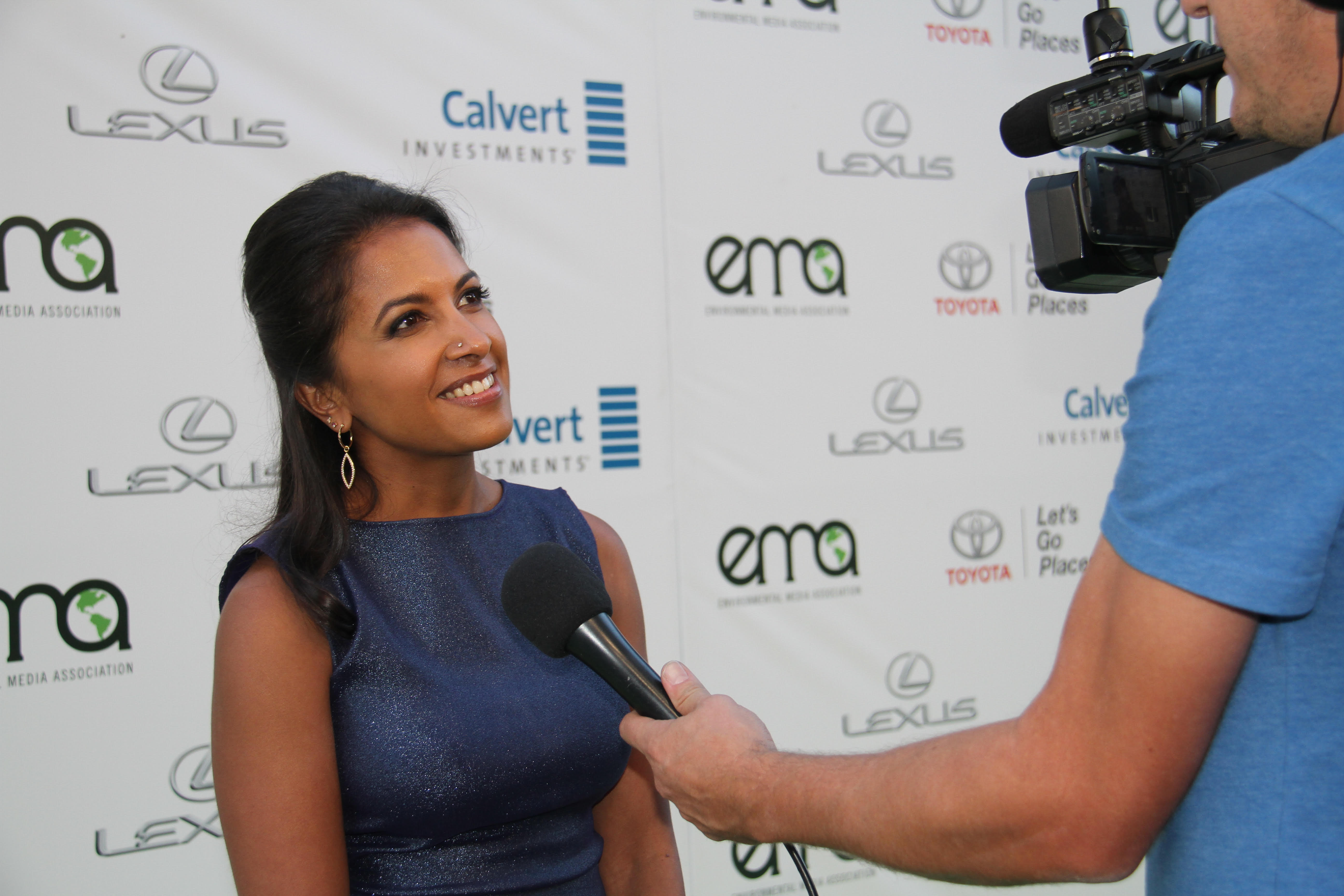
Environmental activist and filmmaker Shalini Kantayya

=== Activism ===
- Alia Amirali, Pakistani politician and activist
- Joseph Amon, epidemiologist, human rights activist at Human Rights Watch
- Chuck Collins, political activist, co-founder of United For a Fair Economy
- Melissa Hoffer, environmental lawyer and Director of the New Hampshire Advocacy Center for the Conservation Law Foundation
- Shalini Kantayya, documentary filmmaker and environmental activist, Catching the Sun
- Lisa Shannon, author, human rights activist, and speaker

=== Arts and design ===
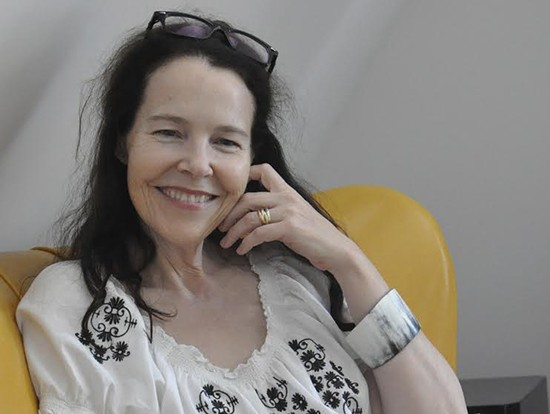
Artist Angela Ellsworth

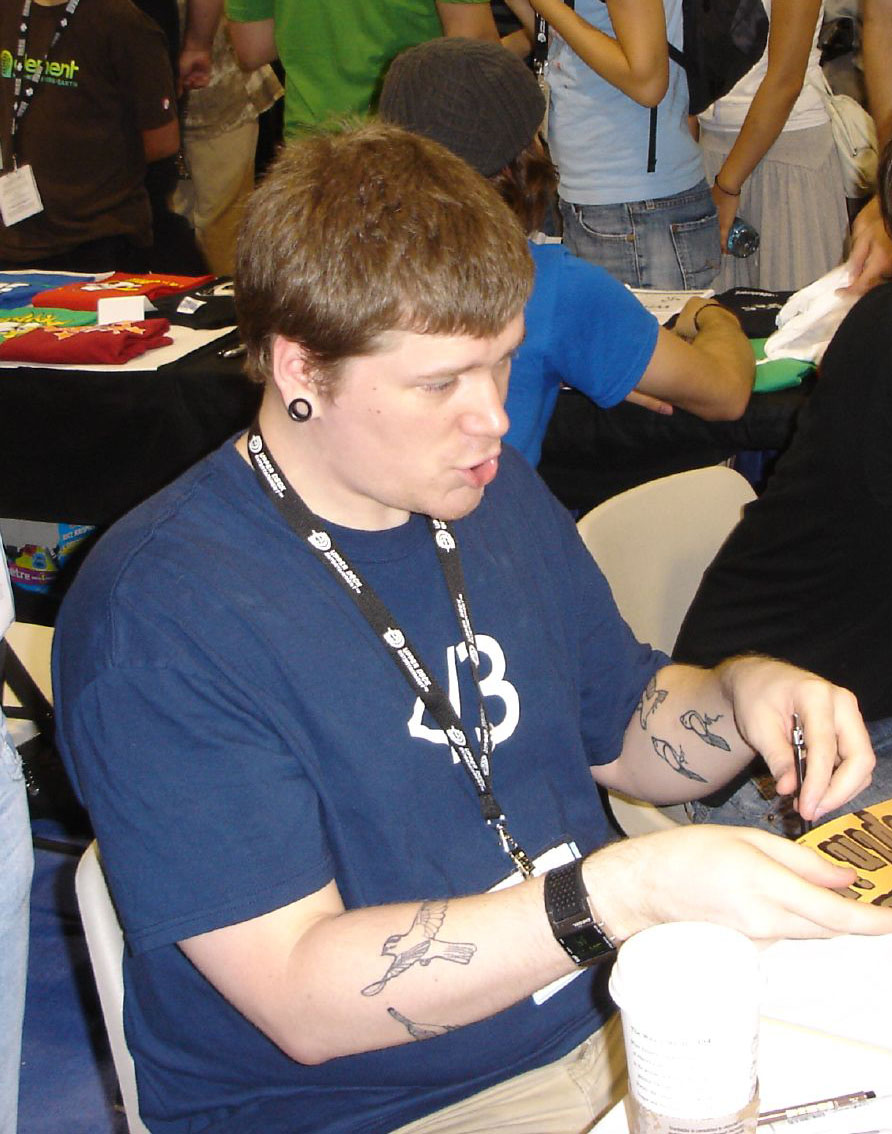
Cartoonist Jeph Jacques

- Mequitta Ahuja, feminist painter, Guggenheim Fellow
- Math Bass, artist
- Gideon Bok, painter, Guggenheim Fellow
- Leidy Churchman, painter
- Barry Marc Cohen, art therapist, Diagnostic Drawing Series
- E.V. Day, artist
- Angela Ellsworth, artist
- Peter Harkawik, artist
- Phoebe Helander, painter
- Every Ocean Hughes (formerly known as Emily Roysdon), visual artist
- Jeph Jacques, artist, Questionable Content
- Emma Kohlmann, curator and artist
- Jane Marsching, artist
- Susan Mikula, artist and photographer
- Christina Quarles, artist
- Kanishka Raja, visual artist
- Raghavendra Rathore, Indian fashion designer
- Steven Siegel, sculptor and installation artist

=== Photography ===
- Doug DuBois, photographer, Guggenheim Fellow
- James Estrin, New York Times senior staff photographer, Pulitzer Prize recipient
- Jane Marsching, interdisciplinary digital artist
- Susan Mikula, artist and photographer

=== Writers and authors ===
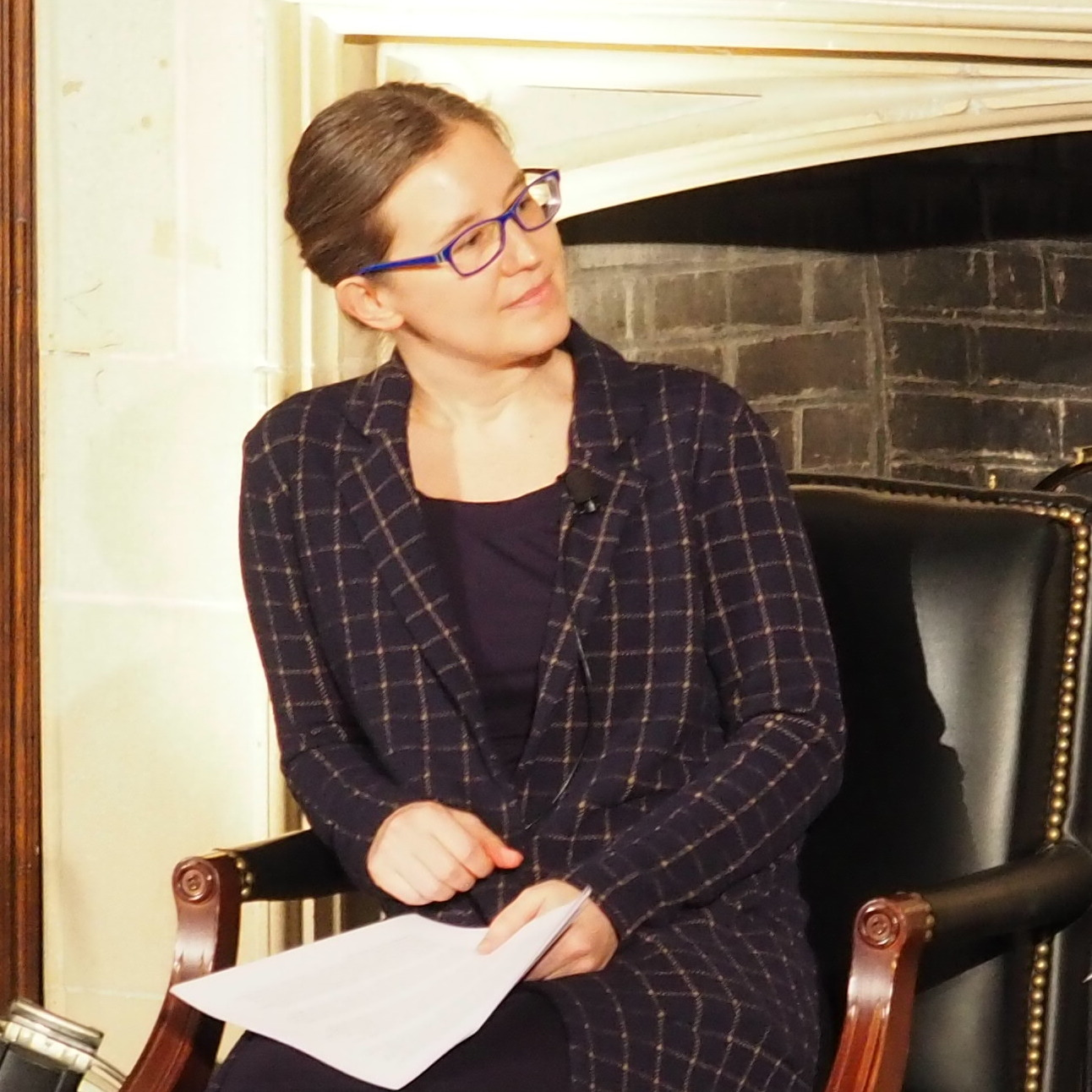
Writer Eula Biss

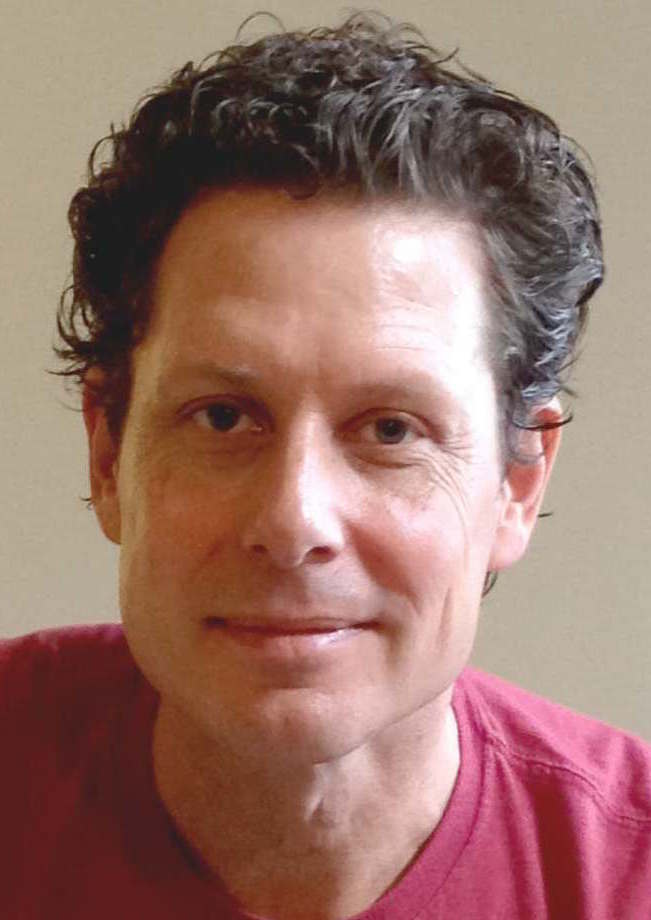
Writer Ethan Gilsdorf

- Lisa Arie, author and motivational speaker, CEO of Vista Caballo
- Alba Arikha, French writer, author of Major/Minor, goddaughter of Samuel Beckett
- Daniel Asia, composer, Guggenheim Fellow, music and culture contributor at the Huffington Post
- Eula Biss, author, Guggenheim Fellow
- Cylin Busby, best-selling author and screenwriter
- David Callahan, founder and editor of Inside Philanthropy
- Rebecca Carroll, writer, editor, and radio producer; former managing editor at xoJane and founding editor of Africana.com
- Leah Hager Cohen, writer
- Kanya D'Almeida, writer and journalist
- Ethan Gilsdorf, writer and journalist, The New York Times, Boston Globe, Wired, Salon
- Eli Gottlieb, novelist, author of The Boy Who Went Away
- Suzanne Greenberg, writer
- David M. Hall, writer and corporate trainer, author of Allies at Work
- Gabrielle Hamilton, chef and author
- Ellis Henican, Newsday columnist, Fox News Channel political analyst, New York Times Bestselling author
- Sidney D. Kirkpatrick, New York Times Bestselling author
- Patricia Klindienst, writer and scholar, American Book Award recipient
- Dan Koeppel, author and journalist, James Beard Award recipient
- Jon Krakauer, mountain climber and writer, New York Times bestselling author of Into The Wild
- Lê Thi Diem Thúy, writer and solo performance artist, Guggenheim Fellow
- Daniel Marcus, science fiction author
- Gary Marcus, cognitive scientist, founder and CEO of Geometric Intelligence, New York Times bestselling author
- P.E. Moskowitz, writer and journalist, author of How to Kill a City
- Daniel José Older, fantasy and young adult fiction writer
- Liz Perle, co-founder and editor-in-chief of Common Sense Media
- Torrey Peters, writer, author of Detransition, Baby
- Jena Pincott, science writer and popular science author
- Jennifer Pozner, author, media critic, feminist
- John Reed, novelist
- Sabrina Seelig, writer (did not graduate)
- Lisa Shannon, author, human rights activist, and speaker
- Timothy Shary, film scholar
- Sonya Sones, poet and writer for young adults, author of What My Mother Doesn't Know
- Matthew Specktor, novelist and memoirist
- Doug Stanton, journalist and New York Times best-selling author
- Thomas H. Stoner, Jr., author and energy entrepreneur, CEO of Entelligent
- Gwen Strauss, writer and author
- Sander Thoenes, journalist
- Maggie Thrash, writer of young adult fiction, Honor Girl
- Alex S. Vitale, sociologist, author of The End of Policing
- Jessamyn West, librarian and blogger, creator of Librarian.net
- Dede Wilson, baker, contributing editor of Bon Appetit, cookbook author

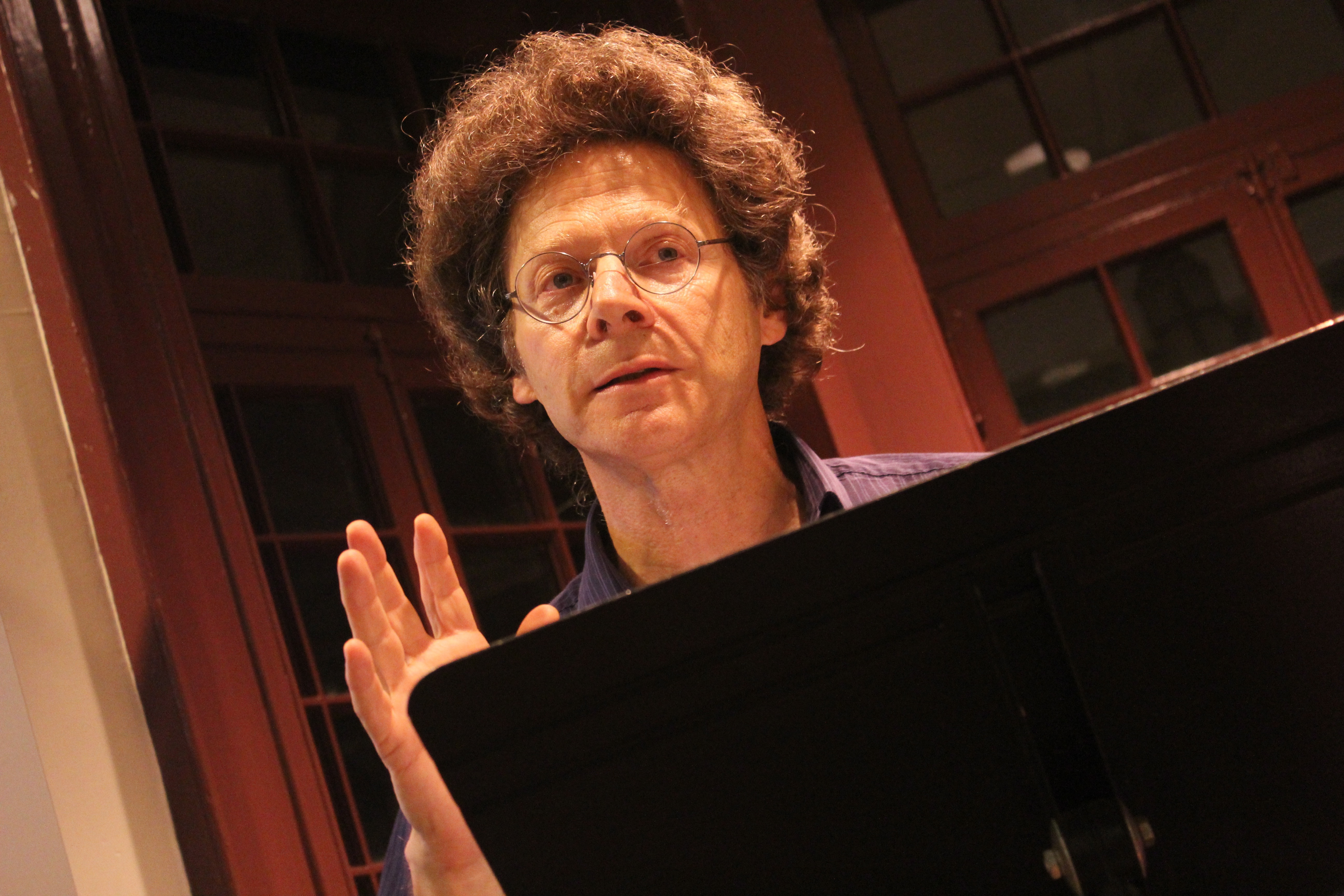
Poet Peter Cole

=== Poets ===
- Janet Aalfs, poet laureate of Northampton, Massachusetts and martial artist
- Joshua Beckman, poet
- S. Bear Bergman, poet
- Chen Chen, poet
- Peter Cole, poet and MacArthur Fellowship recipient
- Ethan Gilsdorf, writer, poet, and journalist, The New York Times, Boston Globe, Wired, Salon
- Cyrée Jarelle Johnson, poet, co-founder of Deaf Poets Society magazine, Lambda Literary Award-winner for Slingshot
- Robin Coste Lewis, poet laureate of Los Angeles, National Book Award winner for Voyage of the Sable Venus
- Sonya Sones, poet and writer for young adults, author of What My Mother Doesn't Know

=== Journalists ===
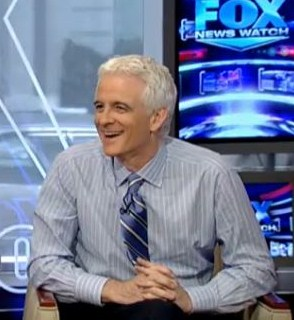
Columnist Ellis Henican

Journalist Jeff Sharlet

- Tina Antolini, journalist and radio producer for NPR and the New York Times.
- Madeleine Baran, Peabody Award-winning investigative reporter and host of the podcast In the Dark
- Suzanne Daley, journalist for The New York Times
- Henry Epp, radio journalist for America Public Media's, Marketplace
- Ethan Gilsdorf, writer, poet, and journalist, The New York Times, Boston Globe, Wired, Salon
- Ellis Henican, Newsday columnist, Fox News Channel political analyst, New York Times Bestselling author
- Edward Humes, Pulitzer Prize-winning journalist
- Josh Landes, Berkshire Bureau Chief, WAMC Radio
- Fariba Nawa, journalist and author
- Amy K. Nelson, journalist, Slate, Deadspin, ESPN
- Jeff Sharlet, journalist, Harper's, Rolling Stone
- Doug Stanton, journalist and New York Times best-selling author
- Sander Thoenes, journalist

=== Tabletop and video games ===
- Meguey Baker, role-playing game designer, independent publisher and quilt historian
- Vincent Baker, role-playing game designer and publisher
- Noah Falstein, video game designer and producer for LucasArts, DreamWorks Interactive, and The 3DO Company; president of The Inspiracy
- Daniel Licht, composer of films and video games, Dexter, Silent Hill

=== Theater ===
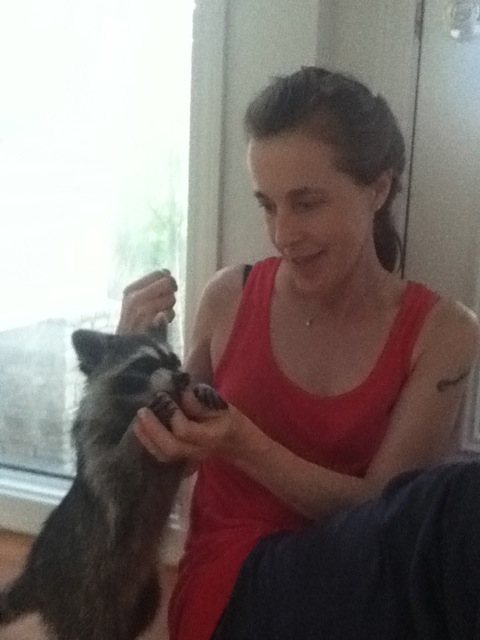
Playwright Naomi Wallace

- Dennis Boutsikaris, Obie Award-winning actor
- Fred Melamed, Independent Spirit Award-winning actor
- Lupita Nyong'o, Academy Award-winning actress, Tony Award-nominee for Eclipsed
- Liev Schreiber, stage and screen actor, star of Emmy-winning series Ray Donovan, Tony Award-winner
- Andrea Stolowitz, playwright
- Naomi Wallace, playwright and MacArthur Fellowship recipient

=== Dance and performance ===
- Meghan Frederick, choreographer
- Christopher-Rasheem McMllan, choreographer, Ism Fellow, CBA Resident Fellow, and associate professor of Dance and Women's Studies, The University of Iowa
- Stephen Petronio, choreographer, Guggenheim Fellow
- Jen Roseblit, choreographer, Bessie award, Guggenheim Fellow
- Mariana Valencia, American multidisciplinary artist, Bessie award, Whitney Biennial artist
- Norah Zuniga Shaw, choreographer, professor at The Ohio state University

=== Film, television, and entertainment ===
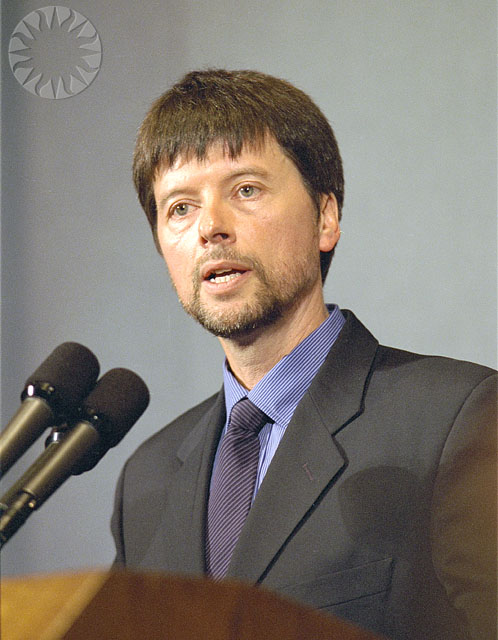
Filmmaker Ken Burns

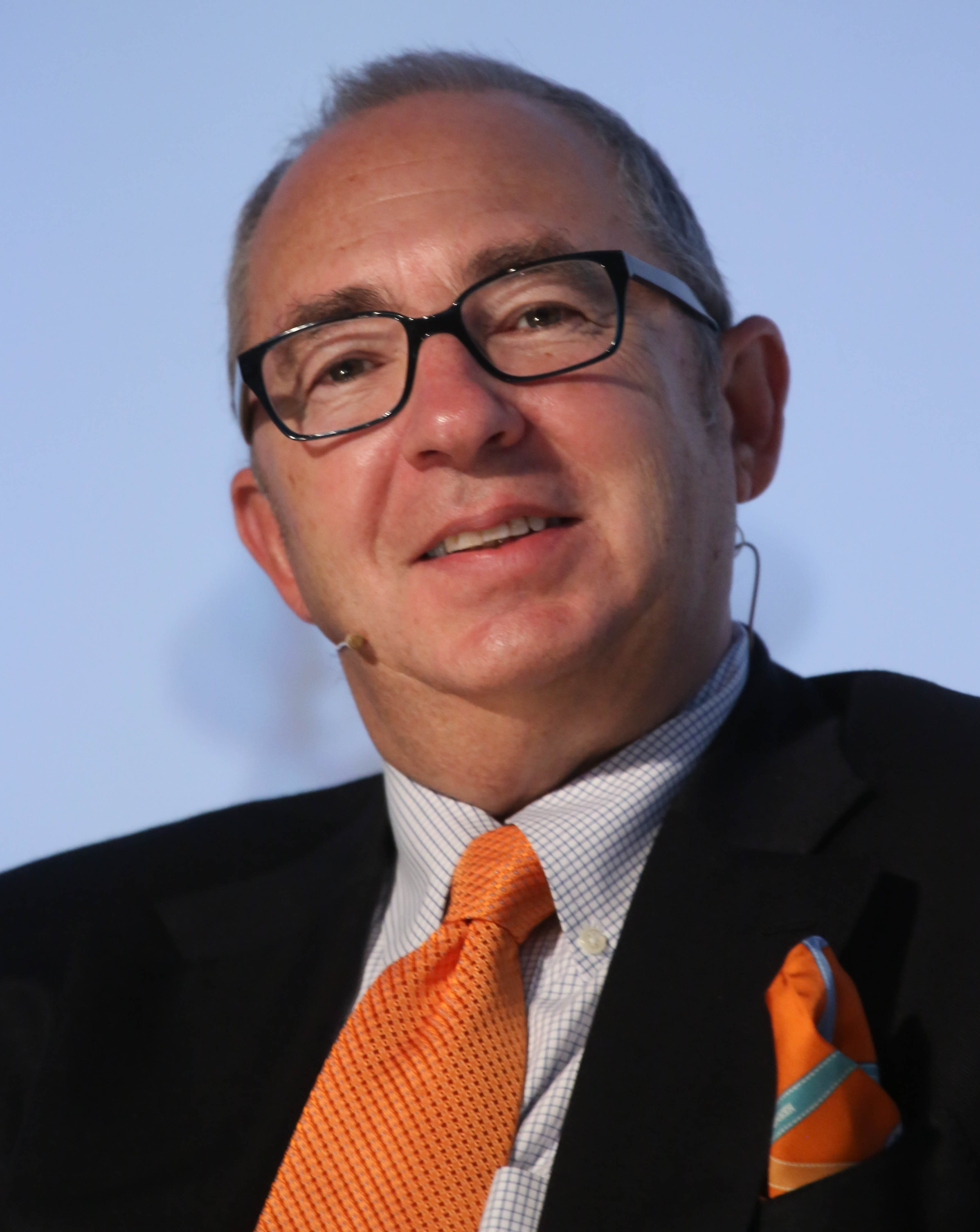
Filmmaker Barry Sonnenfeld

- Chris Applebaum, music video director
- Lesley Arfin, author and staff writer for Girls and Brooklyn Nine-Nine, former Vice contributor
- Ken Burns, Emmy and Peabody Award-winning documentary filmmaker, The Civil War
- Cylin Busby, best-selling author and screenwriter
- Greg Butler, Academy Award-winning visual effects supervisor, Forrest Gump, Harry Potter and the Deathly Hallows - Part 2, 1917
- Charlie Clouser, musician and composer for film and television, former member of Nine Inch Nails
- Rhys Ernst, film producer and director, Adam, Transparent
- John Falsey, Emmy Award-winning television creator of St. Elsewhere, I'll Fly Away and Northern Exposure
- Victor Fresco, television writer and producer, creator of Andy Richter Controls the Universe, Better Off Ted and Santa Clarita Diet
- Sarah Goldfinger, television writer/producer
- Lee Hirsch, filmmaker, Amandla!: A Revolution in Four-Part Harmony, Bully
- Rolfe Kanefsky, filmmaker
- Daniel Licht, composer of films and video games, Dexter, Silent Hill
- Billy Luther, documentary filmmaker, Miss Navajo
- Jeff Maguire, screenwriter, In The Line of Fire, Escape to Victory
- Brett Morgen, Emmy-winning documentary filmmaker, Jane, Kurt Cobain: Montage of Heck
- Julia Willoughby Nason, documentary filmmaker
- Andrea Pallaoro, film director and screenwriter
- Will Reiser, screenwriter and producer, 50/50
- Alex Rivera, filmmaker, Sleep Dealer
- Rod Roddenberry, television producer and CEO of Roddenberry Entertainment, son of Star Trek creator Gene Roddenberry
- Jason Salkey, actor, author and campus brat, Sharpe's Rifles, About a Boy
- Kelly Sears, animator and filmmaker
- Roger Sherman, Emmy and Peabody Award-winning filmmaker
- Max Simonet, co-creator and host of talk show FishCenter Live
- Barry Sonnenfeld, director of The Addams Family, Men in Black trilogy, Wild Wild West and Get Shorty
- Wes Takahashi, visual effects supervisor and animator for the Back To The Future trilogy, Top Gun, The Goonies; creator of the DreamWorks "boy on the moon" logo
- Tiya Tejpal, production designer for The Rapist, Raman Raghav 2.0
- Christopher Young, film composer, Hellraiser, The Grudge, Spider-Man 3
- Teo Žagar, filmmaker and member of the Vermont House of Representatives

=== Actors ===
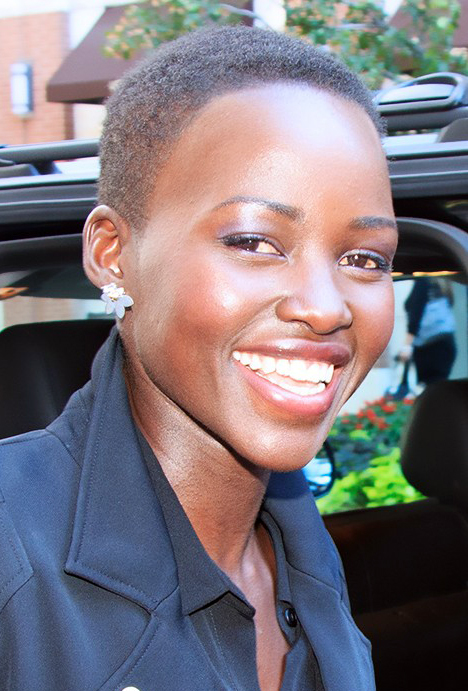
Actress Lupita Nyong'o

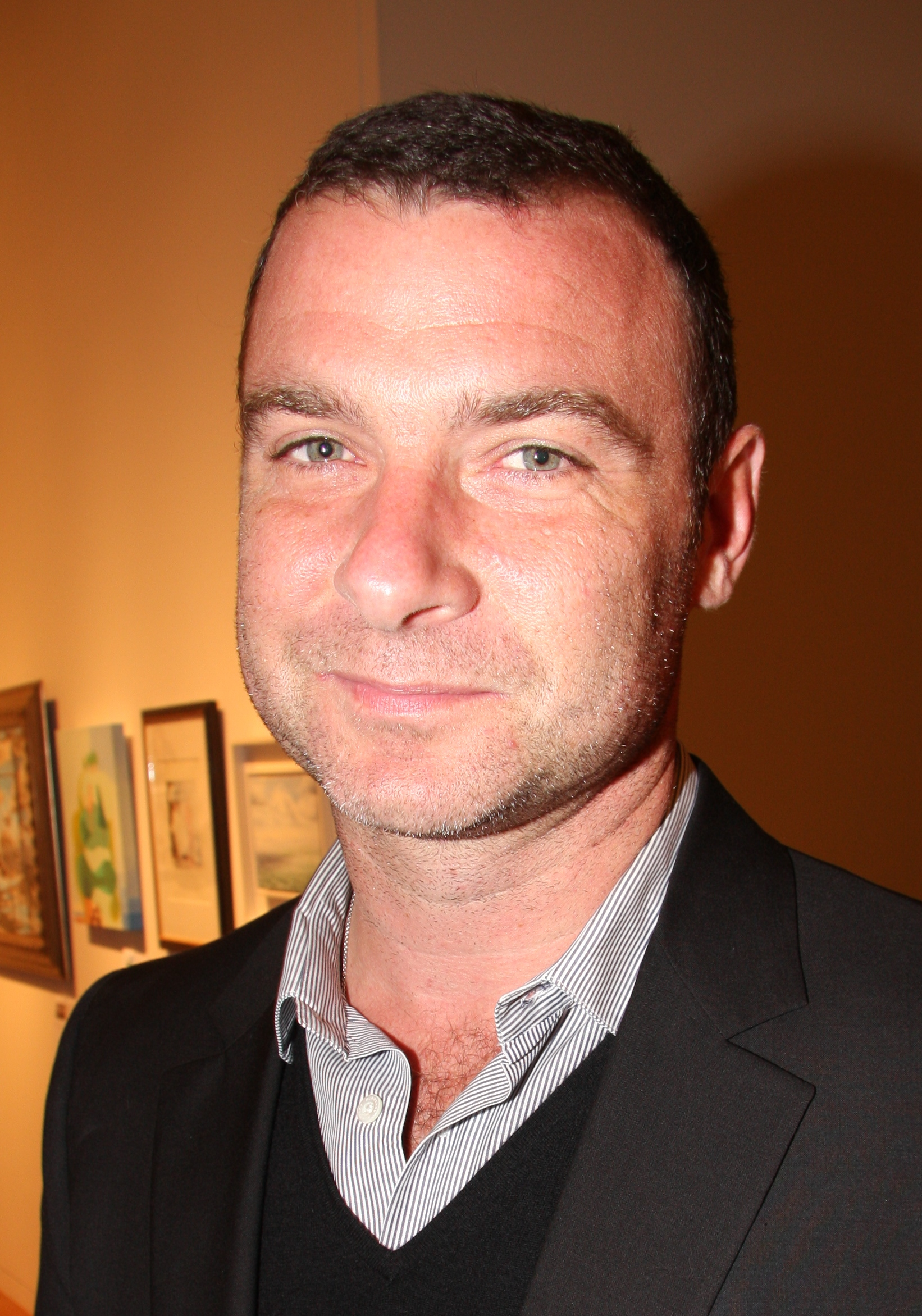
Actor Liev Schreiber

- Xander Berkeley, actor, Terminator 2, Candyman, The Walking Dead, 24
- Dennis Boutsikaris, actor, The Bourne Legacy, Better Call Saul
- Julie Dretzin, actress, Breaking Bad, The Handmaid's Tale
- Adelind Horan, actress, The Deuce
- Fred Melamed, actor, A Serious Man, Lady Dynamite, WandaVision, Barry, Independent Spirit, Screen Actors Guild Award-winner
- Eugene Mirman, stand-up comedian and actor, Bob's Burgers, Delocated
- David Moscow, actor, Big
- Lupita Nyong'o, Academy Award-winning actress, 12 Years a Slave, Us
- Jason Salkey, actor
- Liev Schreiber, stage and screen actor, star of Emmy-winning series Ray Donovan, Tony Award-winner
- Joshua Seth, voice actor, Digimon, Akira
- Aamina Sheikh, Pakistani actress and supermodel
- Max Simonet, co-creator and host of talk show FishCenter Live
- Danny Tamberelli, actor known for The Adventures of Pete & Pete, cast member of All That

=== Government ===
- Alia Amirali, Pakistani politician and activist
- Heather Boushey, economist, president of the Washington Center for Equitable Growth think tank, economic advisor to Hillary Clinton and Joe Biden
- Eileen Brady, candidate for mayor of Portland, Oregon
- Maud Daudon, CEO of the Seattle Metropolitan Chamber of Commerce
- Stephen Gardner, former CEO of Amtrak, founder of experimental music group Chessie
- Tooker Gomberg, Canadian politician and environmental activist
- Kenneth Green, politician and social worker, member of the Connecticut House of Representatives
- Petros S. Kokkalis, businessman and member of the European Parliament
- Dawn M. Liberi, diplomat and former U.S. Ambassador to Burundi under Barack Obama
- Jacob Reider, National Coordinator for Health Information Technology under Barack Obama
- David Shulkin, physician and 9th United States Secretary of Veterans Affairs
- Teo Žagar, filmmaker and member of the Vermont House of Representatives

=== Musicians and composers ===
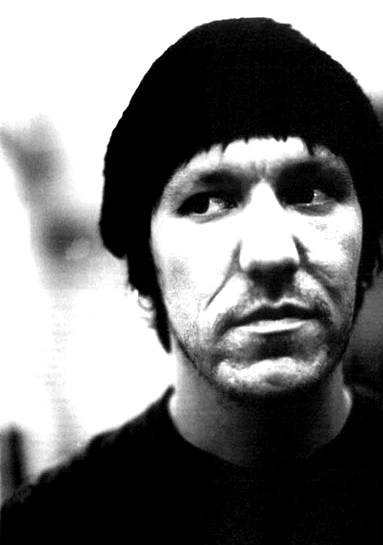
Singer-songwriter Elliott Smith

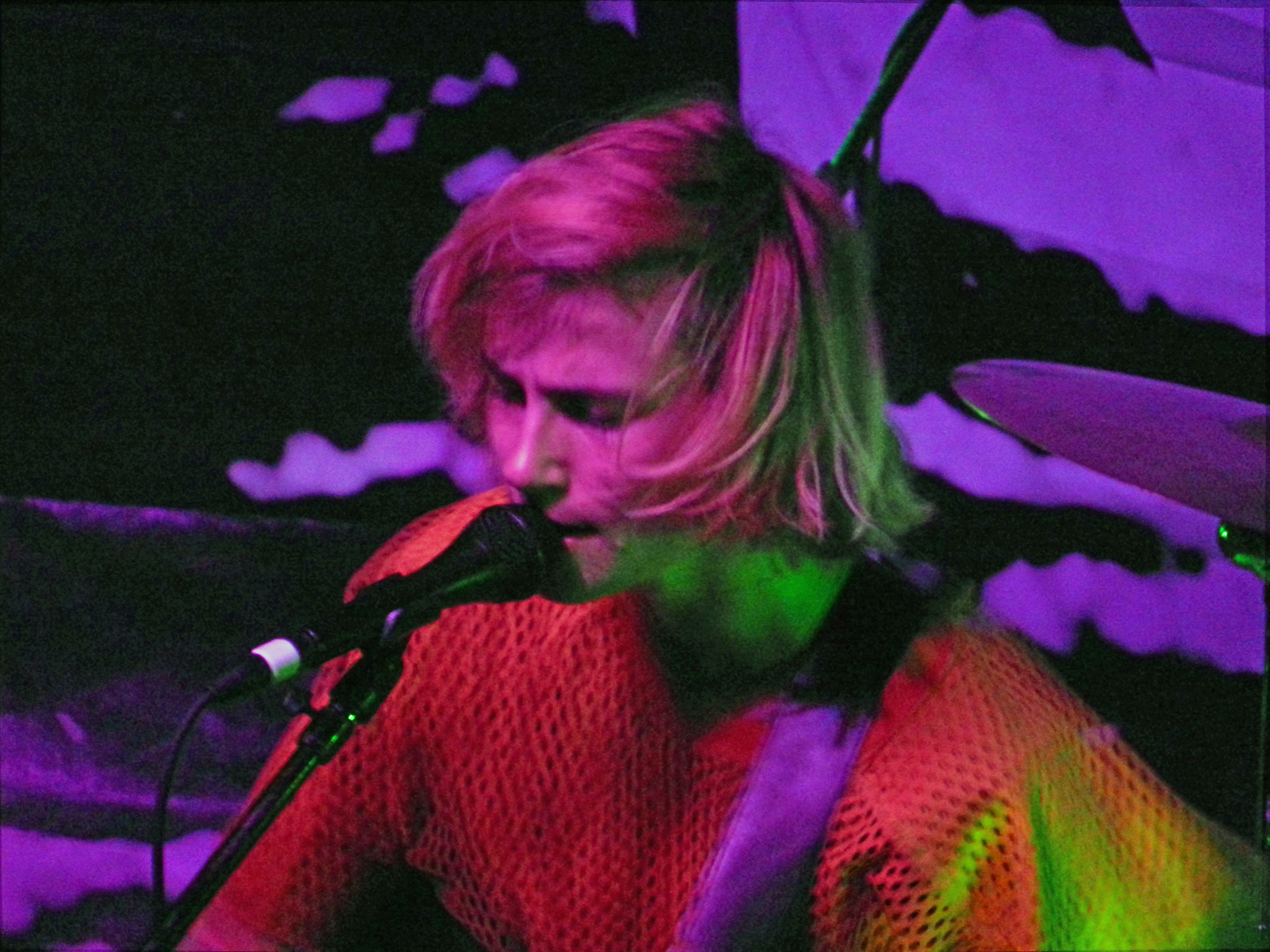
Musician Zachary Cole Smith

- Daniel Asia, composer, Guggenheim Fellow, music and culture contributor at the Huffington Post
- Bob Bralove, musician best known for his work with the Grateful Dead
- Pam Bricker, jazz singer, professor of music, and musical collaborator with Thievery Corporation
- Charlie Clouser, musician and composer for film and television, former member of Nine Inch Nails
- Michael Daves, award-winning bluegrass guitarist/vocalist
- Amy Denio, composer
- Toby Driver, musician and artist, Kayo Dot and Maudlin of the Well
- Ed Droste, singer/songwriter from the Brooklyn-based indie group Grizzly Bear (band)
- Neil Gust, musician and artist, Heatmiser
- Tom Hanway, bluegrass and Celtic banjoist
- Tatiana Hargreaves, old time and bluegrass fiddler
- Jim Johnston, composer
- Mike Ladd, Hip Hop MC and member of the Antipop Consortium
- Ken Leavitt-Lawrence, rap artist a.k.a. "MC Hawking"
- Daniel Licht, composer of films and video games, Dexter, Silent Hill franchise
- Daniel Lopatin (also known as Oneohtrix Point Never, Chuck Person, Dania Shapes), composer of electronic music, including Marty Supreme and other film scores
- Matt Mondanile, musician, Ducktails & Real Estate
- Ann Moss, soprano
- Orchid, hardcore punk band
- Elliott Smith, Academy Award-nominated indie-folk musician, singer-songwriter, and multi-instrumentalist
- Zachary Cole Smith, musician, frontman of DIIV
- Ilene Stahl, klezmer clarinetist, founder Klezperanto
- Supreme Dicks, lo-fi and experimental band
- Autre Ne Veut, musician
- Michael "Mudcat" Ward, blues bassist, pianist and songwriter
- Erica Wheeler, singer-songwriter
- Christopher Young, film composer, Hellraiser, The Grudge, Spider-Man 3

=== Business ===
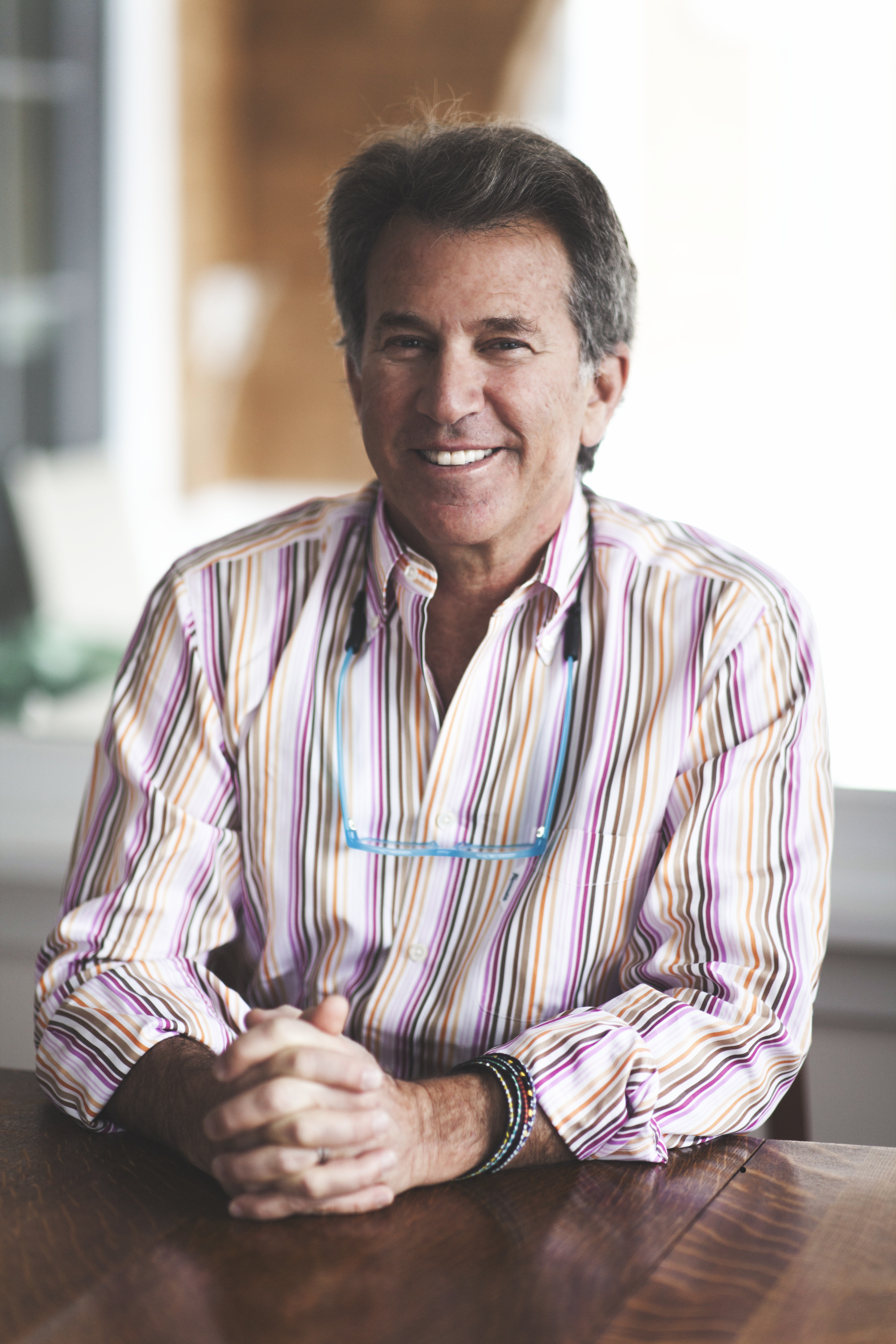
Seventh Generation Inc. co-founder Jeffrey Hollander

- Lisa Arie, author and motivational speaker, CEO of Vista Caballo
- Nicholas Callaway, founder of Callaway Arts & Entertainment
- James Crown, president of Henry Crown and Company, director of JPMorgan Chase & Co., General Dynamics and Sara Lee
- Jose Fuentes, co-founder/developer of Duolingo
- David M. Hall, writer and corporate trainer, author of Allies at Work
- Judith Herrell, president of Herrell's Ice Cream
- Benjamin Mako Hill, technologist, software developer and founding member of Ubuntu and Debian projects, assistant professor in Communication at the University of Washington
- Gary Hirshberg, Chairman, President, and "CE-Yo" of Stonyfield Farm
- Jeffrey Hollender, President and CEO of Seventh Generation Inc.
- Mark Kriegsman, computer programmer and Director of Engineering at Veracode
- Aaron Lansky, founder of the National Yiddish Book Center, MacArthur Fellow
- Chris Lavergne, founder of the website Thought Catalog
- Gary Marcus, cognitive scientist, founder and CEO of Geometric Intelligence, New York Times bestselling author
- Bob McCarthy, student 1972–1976, Hampshire Trustee 2010–2018, trading (Libra Bank and Morgan Grenfell & Co) and investing (Spinnaker Capital)
- Nicholas Merrill, computer programmer and entrepreneur, founder of The Calyx Institute and plaintiff in the legal case Doe v. Ashcroft
- Liz Perle, co-founder and editor-in-chief of Common Sense Media
- Thomas H. Stoner, Jr., author and energy entrepreneur, CEO of Entelligent

=== Law ===
- Melissa Hoffer, environmental lawyer and Director of the New Hampshire Advocacy Center for the Conservation Law Foundation
- Daniel Horowitz, high-profile criminal-defense attorney
- Kathryn Tucker, high-profile attorney and executive director of the End of Life Liberty Project

=== Chefs ===
- Gabrielle Hamilton, chef and author
- Dede Wilson, baker, contributing editor of Bon Appetit, cookbook author

=== Other notable alumni ===
- Elizabeth Armstrong, art curator
- Johnny Dwork, two-time world champion flying disc freestyle athlete

=== Fictional alumni ===
- Alice Kinnon (Chloë Sevigny), lead character from the film The Last Days of Disco
- Charlotte Pingress (Kate Beckinsale), lead character from the film The Last Days of Disco
- Gobi (Horatio Sanz), character on the reoccurring Saturday Night Live sketch Jarret's Room
- Jarret (Jimmy Fallon), character on the reoccurring Saturday Night Live sketch Jarret's Room

== Hampshire College Summer Studies in Mathematics alumni ==
Alumni of HCSSiM include many mathematicians and others in related (and not-so-related) fields.

- Gabriel Aeppli, professor of physics at ETH Zurich, co-founder of the London Centre for Nanotechnology, Fellow of the Royal Society
- Julie Ahringer, professor of genetics at the University of Cambridge, Fellow of the Royal Society
- Douglas N. Arnold, professor of mathematics at the University of Minnesota
- Jeremy Avigad, professor of philosophy and mathematics at Carnegie Mellon University
- J. Stewart Burns, television writer and producer known for his work on The Simpsons
- Bram Cohen, developer of BitTorrent, co-founder of CodeCon
- Matthew Cook, computer scientist, group leader at the Institute for Neuroinformatics at ETH Zurich
- Lenore Cowen, computer scientist and mathematician at Tufts University
- Marie desJardins, computer scientist, former dean at Simmons University, formerly at SRI International
- Alan Edelman, professor of mathematics at the Massachusetts Institute of Technology, Sloan Fellow
- Aaron M. Ellison, retired Harvard ecologist
- Glenn Ellison, professor of economics at MIT
- Judy Goldsmith, professor of computer science at the University of Kentucky
- Alan Grayson, former member of the U.S House of Representatives for Florida's 8th and 9th Congressional Districts
- Marcia Groszek, professor of mathematics at Dartmouth College
- Neil Immerman, professor of computer science at the University of Massachusetts Amherst, Guggenheim Fellow
- Adam Tauman Kalai, game theorist and computer scientist formerly at OpenAI
- Susan Landau, professor in cybersecurity and policy at Tufts University, Guggenheim Fellow
- Eric Lander, professor of biology at MIT, presidential science advisor, MacArthur Fellow, Rhodes Scholar
- Adam Leibovich, theoretical physicist and dean at University of Pittsburgh
- Russell Lyons, professor of mathematics at Indiana University Bloomington
- Adam Marcus, professor of mathematics at Princeton University
- Barry Nalebuff, professor of management at Yale University, co-founder of Honest Tea
- David Notkin, former professor of computer science and engineering at University of Washington
- Cathy O'Neil, data scientist, author, and blogger at Mathbabe
- Eve Ostriker, professor of astrophysics at Princeton
- Michael Pepper, physicist notable for his work in semiconductor nanostructures, Fellow of the Royal Society
- Bjorn Poonen, professor of mathematics at MIT, Putnam Competition winner
- Jim Propp, professor of mathematics at the University of Massachusetts Lowell
- Dana Randall, professor of computer science at Georgia Tech, sister of Lisa
- Lisa Randall, professor of theoretical physics at Harvard University, author, Fellow of the Institute of Physics
- Jessica Riskin, professor of history of science at Stanford University
- Robert Schapire, computer scientist at Microsoft Research, former professor of computer science at Princeton
- Ed Scheinerman, professor of applied mathematics and statistics at Johns Hopkins University
- Seth Schoen, technologist at the Electronic Frontier Foundation, author of the DeCSS haiku
- Noam Shazeer, computer scientist at OpenAI, who co-led Google Gemini and founded character.ai
- Lisa Su, chair and CEO of AMD
- John Sullivan, professor of mathematics at Technische Universität Berlin
- Jennifer Taback, professor of mathematics at Bowdoin College
- Ann Trenk, professor of mathematics at Wellesley College
- Eugene Volokh, legal scholar at the Hoover Institution, professor emeritus of UCLA School of Law, author of The Volokh Conspiracy
- Martin M. Wattenberg, professor of computer science at Harvard University, known for work in data visualization at Google and IBM Research
- Victor Wickerhauser, professor of mathematics at Washington University in St. Louis
- Elizabeth Wilmer, professor of mathematics at Oberlin College
- Erik Winfree, professor of computer science and bioengineering at the California Institute of Technology, MacArthur Fellow
- David Zuckerman, professor of computer science at University of Texas at Austin

== Past and present faculty ==
=== Film and video ===
- Joan Braderman, video artist and director, MacArthur Fellow
- Bill Brand, experimental filmmaker
- Peter Hutton (filmmaker), experimental filmmaker
- Penny Lane (filmmaker), documentary filmmaker
- Jerome Liebling, filmmaker and photographer, Guggenheim Fellow
- Kara Lynch, video artist
- Elaine Mayes, filmmaker and photographer, Guggenheim Fellow
- Julia Meltzer, video artist, Guggenheim Fellow
- Walid Raad/Atlas Group, video and multi-media artist
- Abraham Ravett, documentary filmmaker
- Ellen Spiro, Emmy Award-winning documentary filmmaker

=== Photography ===
- Diane Arbus, photographer, Guggenheim Fellow
- Jacqueline Hayden, feminist photographer and video artist
- Jerome Liebling, filmmaker and photographer, Guggenheim Fellow
- Elaine Mayes, filmmaker and photographer, Guggenheim Fellow
- Carrie Mae Weems, photographer, MacArthur Fellow

=== Visual arts ===
- Leonard Baskin, graphic artist and sculptor, Guggenheim Fellow
- David Diao, painter

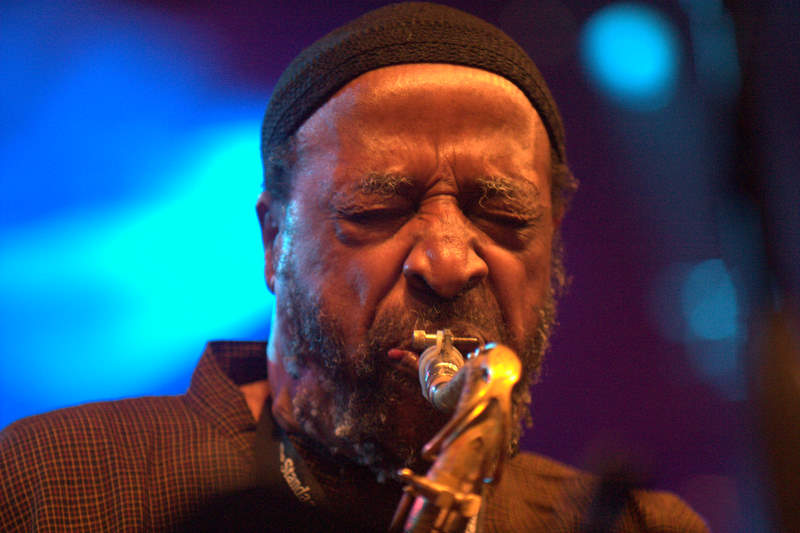
Jazz musician Yusef Lateef

=== Theater ===
- Josephine Abady, theater director

=== Music ===
- Ray Copeland, jazz musician
- Mark Dresser, jazz musician
- Marty Ehrlich, jazz musician, Guggenheim Fellow
- Yusef Lateef, jazz musician, Grammy Award-winner
- Rebecca S. Miller, ethnomusicologist, fiddler, Fulbright Fellow
- Roland Wiggins, music theorist, music teacher to John Coltrane, Thelonious Monk, Yusef Lateef, Buster Williams, Jimmy Owens, and Billy Taylor

=== Politics ===
- Eqbal Ahmad, political scientist, writer and academic
- Michael Klare, scholar on U.S. defense policy and global resource issues

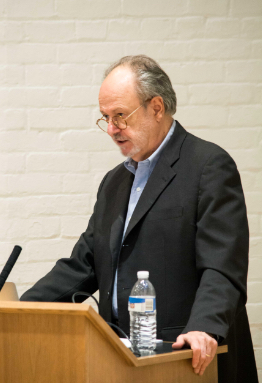
Historian Anson Rabinbach

=== History ===
- Anson Rabinbach, historian of modern Europe, co-founder of New German Critique, Guggenheim Fellow
- E. Frances White, historian

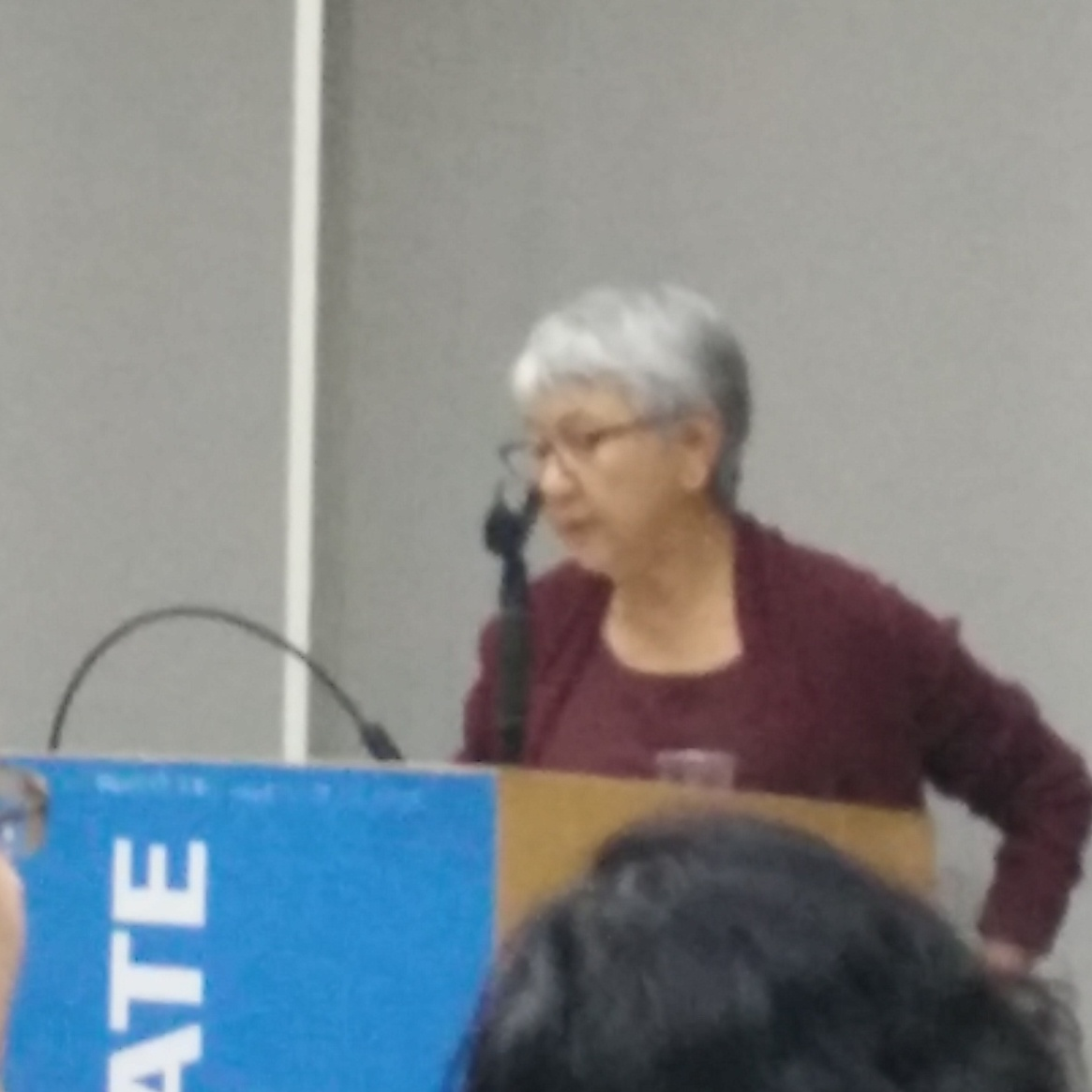
Anthropologist Aihwa Ong

=== Anthropology ===
- Leonard Glick, anthropologist, historian of ideas and Judaism
- Alan H. Goodman, anthropologist
- Aihwa Ong, anthropologist, MacArthur Fellow

=== Psychology ===
- John Roosevelt Boettiger, psychologist, grandson of Franklin D. Roosevelt

=== Writing and journalism ===
- James Baldwin, novelist, essayist, poet, playwright and activist
- Ronnie Dugger, journalist, Harper's Magazine, The Nation, The New Yorker, founder of The Texas Observer, George Polk Award-winner
- David Anthony Durham, historical and epic fantasy novelist
- Lynne Hanley, literary critic and feminist
- Norton Juster, architect and writer, author of The Phantom Tollbooth
- Michael Lesy, writer and literary journalist, author of Wisconsin Death Trip
- Elinor Lipman, novelist, short story writer, and essayist
- David Roberts, mountaineer and author
- Andrew Salkey, writer
- Eric Schocket, American studies and literature scholar
- Helaine Selin, librarian, author, and editor

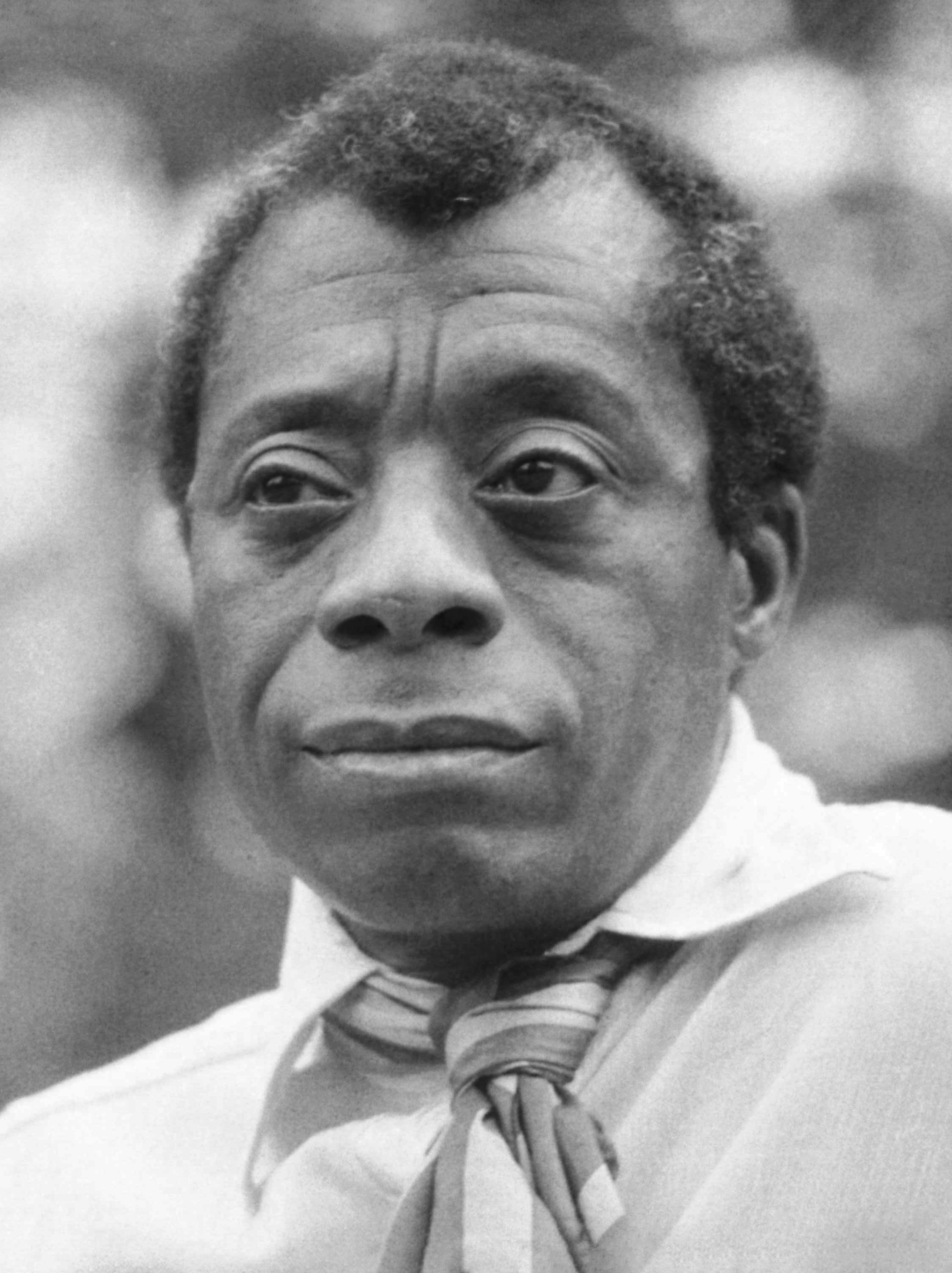
Writer James Baldwin

=== Poetry ===
- Polina Barskova, poet
- Aracelis Girmay, poet
- Paul Jenkins, professor of poetry
- John Murillo, poet
- Chase Twichell, poet, Guggenheim Fellow

=== Mathematics and science ===
- Raymond Coppinger, professor of biology and cognitive science
- David Kelly, professor of mathematics
- Margaret M. Robinson, mathematician

=== Ecology ===
- Arthur H. Westing, professor of ecology and dean of the School of Natural Science, Guggenheim Fellow

=== Other ===
- Ngawang Samten, Tibetologist
- Robert Sanborn, activist and President/CEO of Children At Risk
- Jonathan Westphal, professor of philosophy

== Presidents ==
- Franklin Patterson (1966–1971), first president of Hampshire College and co-author of the New College Plan
- Charles R. Longsworth (1971–1977), current director of Saul Centers, Inc., former President, CEO, and Chairman of The Colonial Williamsburg Foundation
- Adele S. Simmons (1977–1989), former President of the MacArthur Foundation and first female dean of student affairs at Princeton University
- Gregory S. Prince Jr. (1989–2005), chairman of the Association of Independent Colleges and Universities in Massachusetts and vice-chair of the Council on Racial and Ethnic Justice of the American Bar Association
- Ralph J. Hexter (2005–2010), former dean at UC Berkeley and Acting Chancellor of UC Davis, founding member of LGBTQ Presidents in Higher Education
- Marlene Gerber Fried (2010–2011) (interim)
- Jonathan Lash (2011–2018), attorney, member of the board of directors and former president of the World Resources Institute
- Miriam E. Nelson (2018–2019), acting president and CEO of Newman's Own Foundation, best-selling author, and nutritionist
- Kenneth Rosenthal (2019) (interim)
- Edward Wingenbach (2019–2025), former acting president of Ripon College
- Jennifer Chrisler (2025–present), director of Advancement (Hampshire College), director of Family Equality Council
