= Concetta =

- Pronunciation: Italian: [konˈtʃɛtta]
- Gender: Female

Origin
- Region of origin: Italy

Other names
- Related names: Connie, Constance

Concetta is an Italian female given name. Notable people with the name include:

- Concetta Benn (1926–2011), an Australian social worker
- Concetta Brincat, Maltese-language novelist
- Isabella Biagini (1940–2018), an Italian actress, born Concetta Biagini
- Concetta Caristo, an Australian radio presenter and comedian
- Concetta Damante (born 1972), Italian politician
- Concetta DiRusso, American biochemist
- Concetta Fierravanti-Wells (born 1960), an Australian politician
- Connie Francis (1937–2025), an American singer, born Concetta Rosa Maria Franconero
- Concetta Mason (born 1952), an American glass artist
- Concetta Milanese (born 1962), an Italian shot putter
- Connie Panzarino (1947–2001), an American writer and activist
- Concetta Scaravaglione (1900–1975), an American sculptor
- Connie Stevens (born 1938), an American actress and singer, born Concetta Rosalie Ann Ingoglia
- Princess Superstar (born 1971), an American rapper and singer, born Concetta Suzanne Kirschner
- Concetta M. Tomaino (born 1954), an American music therapist
- Concetta Tomei (born 1945), an American actress
- Concepció Bordalba (1866–1910), a Spanish opera singer, known professionally as Concetta Bordalba
