= Philip Robertson =

Philip Robertson may refer to:

- Philip Robertson (British Army officer) (1866–1936), British Army general
- Philip Robertson (chemist) (1884–1969), New Zealand chemist, university professor, and writer
- G. Philip Robertson, American biologist
- Phil Robertson, American hunter, businessman and reality television star
