= Jim Marshall (photographer) =

American photographer (1936–2010)

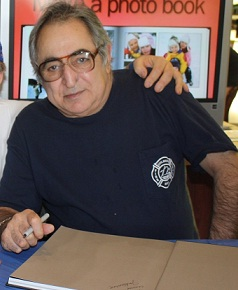
- Marshall at a book signing in 2009
- Born: James Joseph Marshall; February 3, 1936; Chicago, Illinois, U.S.
- Died: March 24, 2010 (aged 74); New York City, New York, U.S.
- Occupations: Photographer; photojournalist
- Years active: 1959–2010

James Joseph Marshall (February 3, 1936 – March 24, 2010) was an American photographer and photojournalist who photographed musicians of the 1960s and 1970s. Earning the trust of his subjects, he had extended access to them both on and off-stage. Marshall was the official photographer for the Beatles' final concert in San Francisco's Candlestick Park, and he was head photographer at Woodstock.

== Early life ==
Marshall was born on February 3, 1936, in Chicago, Illinois, to Assyrian parents from Iran. His family moved to San Francisco, California, when he was two years old, but soon after that, his father left Marshall and his mother. While still in high school, Marshall purchased his first camera and began documenting musicians and artists in San Francisco.

After serving several years in the United States Air Force, he returned and moved to New York for two years.

== Career ==
Marshall was hired by Atlantic Records and Columbia Records to photograph their musical artists. His photos appeared on the covers of over 500 albums and more were published in Rolling Stone. He photographed Jimi Hendrix setting his guitar on fire at the Monterey Pop Festival, and Johnny Cash at San Quentin.

His candid photos of 1960s and 1970s musicians, taken both on stage and off, were possible because of the access they allowed him. His pictures of Neil Young, Janis Joplin, Bob Dylan, Jim Morrison, the Allman Brothers, The Who, Led Zeppelin, the Grateful Dead, the Jefferson Airplane, Guns N' Roses, Santana and the Beatles "helped define their subjects as well as rock 'n' roll photography itself." Marshall also photographed jazz musicians such as Thelonious Monk, John Coltrane, and Miles Davis.

"When I'm photographing people, I don't like to give any direction. There are no hair people fussing around, no make-up artists. I'm like a reporter, only with a camera; I react to my subject in their environment, and if it's going well, I get so immersed in it that I become one with the camera."

Annie Leibovitz said he was "the rock 'n' roll photographer." His work was included in the Annie Leibovitz edited book, Shooting Stars: the Rolling Stones Book of Portraits (Straight Arrow Press, 1973), alongside photographers Herb Greene, Baron Wolman, Annie Leibovitz, Nevis Cameron, Ed Caraeff, David Gahr, Bob Seidemann, Barry Feinstein, Ethan Russell, and others.

Other photographic assignments included shooting the Indianapolis 500 in 2005 for Autoweek and the 2007 introduction of the Nissan GT-R.

An exhibition of Jim Marshall's photographs went on show at the Rebecca Hossack Gallery in London in January 2020, continuing at the Royal Albert Hall in February and March that year.

== Personal life ==
Marshall's forceful personality became something of a celebrity of its own. Not having any children, he used to say "I have no kids, My photographs are my children."

In 1967 he dated Folgers coffee heiress, Abigail Folger, who accompanied him and fellow photographer Elaine Mayes to the Monterey Pop Festival. Folger was murdered, in 1969, by followers of Charles Manson.

Marshall lived in San Francisco, but he died in New York City while on a trip during which he was scheduled to speak in SoHo. He was 74 at the time of his death.

In 1978, Jim Marshall gave Ginger Kraus, a close friend, a photo from his shoot with Grace Slick and Janis Joplin, the only time they were photographed together. On Ginger's 28th birthday, Jim gifted her the shot of Grace sticking her tongue out inches from Janis's face. The rest of this collection was for sale at a gallery on Geary St. in San Francisco as of 2017. The shot owned by Ginger has never been seen by the public.

== Publications ==
- Monterey Pop (1992)
- Not Fade away: The Rock and Roll Photography of Jim Marshall (1997)
- Proof (2004)
- Jim Marshall: Jazz (2005)
- Trust (2009)
- Pocket Cash (2010)
- The Rolling Stones 1972 (2012)
- The Haight: Love, Rock, and Revolution (2014)
- Jazz Festival (2016)
- Peace (2017)
- Cash at Folsom and San Quentin (2018)
- Jim Marshall: Show Me the Picture (2018)
- The Grateful Dead by Jim Marshall: Photos and Stories from the Formative Years, 1966–1977 (2025)

== Awards ==
- 2004: Outstanding Achievement In Music Photography, Lucie Awards
- 2014: Posthumously given a Trustees Award (part of the Lifetime Achievement Awards) at the 56th Grammy Awards, the first and only photographer, as of 2014, to receive one

== Films about Marshall ==
- Show Me the Picture: The Story of Jim Marshall (2019) – documentary directed by Alfred George Bailey
