= Arikha =

Arikha (Hebrew: אריכא) is a Hebrew surname. Notable people with the surname include:

- Abba Arikha (175–247 CE), Jewish amora
- Alba Arikha (born 1966), French-British writer, daughter of Avigdor
- Avigdor Arikha (1928–2010), French-Israeli artist, father of Alba
