= Schimel =

Schimel is a surname. Notable people with the surname include:

- Brad Schimel (born 1965), American prosecutor and judge
- David Schimel, NASA research scientist
- Lawrence Schimel (born 1971), American science fiction and fantasy writer, translator, and anthologist
- Michelle Schimel (born 1957), American politician
