= James Estrin =

American photographer

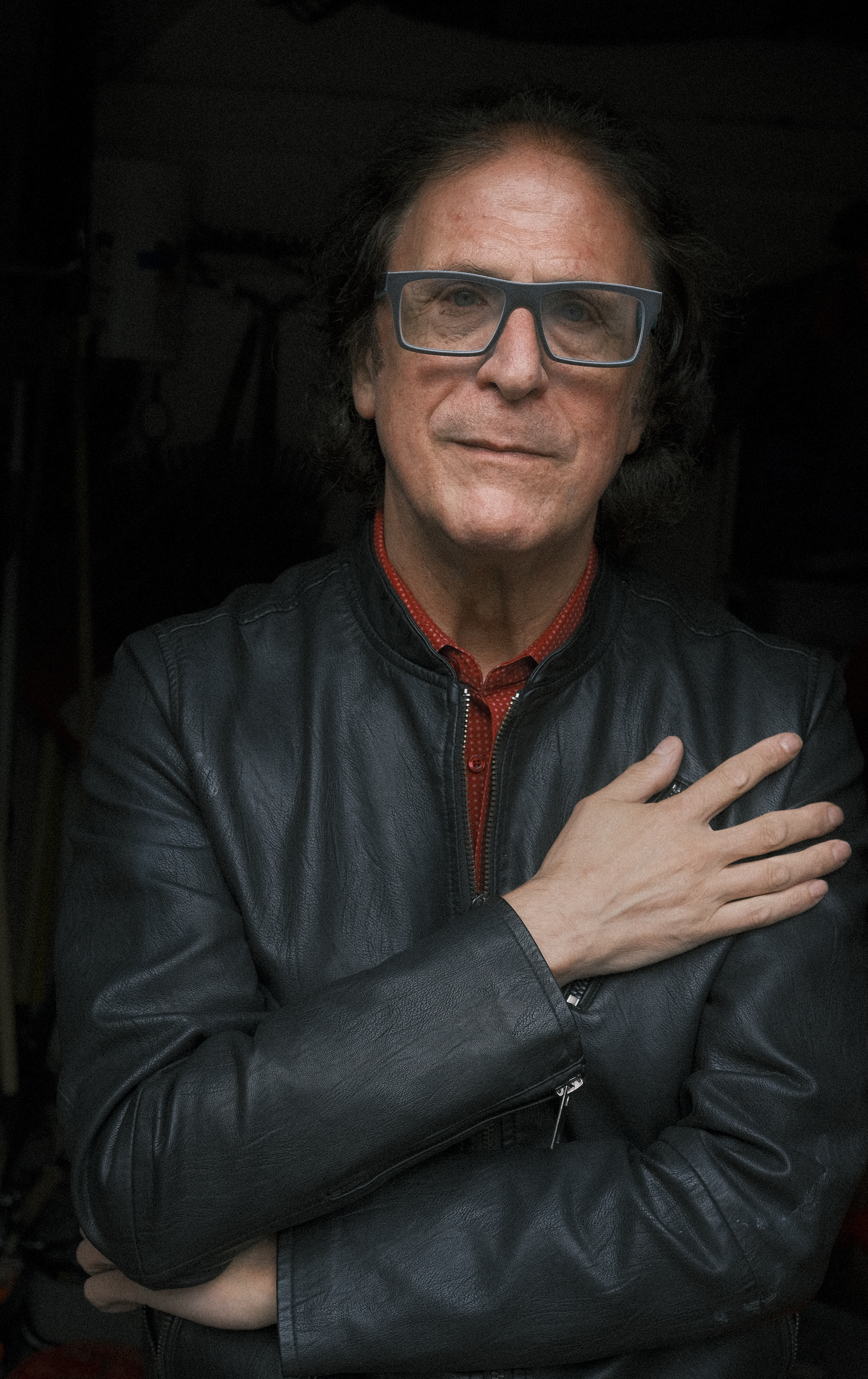
- Born: James Estrin; February 16, 1957 (age 69); New York City, US
- Education: Hampshire College (BA); International Center of Photography
- Employer(s): The New York Times; City University of New York
- Awards: Pulitzer Prize for "How Race is Lived in America"

James Estrin (born February 16, 1957) is a photographer, writer, filmmaker, and academic. He is a New York Times senior staff photographer and founder of Lens, The New York Times photography blog. Estrin was part of a team that won a 2001 Pulitzer Prize for a national series of articles entitled “How Race Is Lived In America." He is also the co-executive producer of the documentary film "Underfire: The Untold Story of Pfc. Tony Vaccaro" which appeared on HBO in November 2016.

== Early life and education ==
Estrin was born in Manhattan and raised in New Rochelle by two physicians, Dr. Irving Jonathan Estrin, a professor at Albert Einstein College of Medicine, and Dr. Elizabeth Glogau Estrin, a faculty member at Columbia Presbyterian Medical Center. Estrin attended Hampshire College in Amherst, MA from 1975 to 1979 where he studied anthropology and labor history as well as photography with Jerome Liebling. From 1979 to 1980, he attended the International Center of Photography's Advanced Studies Program where his teachers included Eugene Richards and Fred Ritchin.

== Career ==
In 1981, Estrin became a staff photographer for the Clarion-Ledger in Jackson, MS. where he worked for the next two years. He then freelanced in New York City for the city's major newspapers including Newsday, the New York Post and the New York Daily News. He began freelancing for The New York Times in 1987 and joined the Times staff in 1992.

Estrin photographed in Israel, the West Bank and Gaza in 1993, 1998 and again in 2002. In 2004, he was the first journalist to photograph an assisted suicide in Oregon, a multimedia story for which he photographed, produced audio and wrote articles. In 2010, he traveled to Haiti to document the aftermath of the earthquake there.

In 2014, he was the subject of the documentary feature “Behind the Lens with Photographer James Estrin” produced by the Oprah Winfrey Network. The piece focused on a series of Estrin's photos that explored spiritual experience. The photos were also the subject of a solo exhibition of Estrin's work mounted by the 92nd Street Y in New York earlier that year.

One year after the collapse of the World Trade Center, Estrin took the iconic photo of the World Trade Center Memorial in which a swirl of dust enfolds a circle of survivors at Ground Zero. It was “as if there were spirits on the ground there,” he recalled.

== Lens blog ==
In May 2009, Estrin created Lens, The New York Times' photography blog, with Josh Haner and David Dunlap. Estrin and Dunlap co-edited Lens until 2011 when David Gonzalez, a Times metro columnist and former foreign correspondent, became co-editor with Estrin when Dunlap returned to his post as a full-time reporter and Haner went on to focus on his own photography.

Through Lens, Estrin has chronicled a turbulent period in photojournalism and has featured photographers from diverse backgrounds around the globe.

In 2013, Estrin created the New York Portfolio Review, an annual event in which photographers from around the world meet with internationally prominent photo editors, critics, curators, book publishers, video producers and gallery owners in private meetings. As of 2017, the event is in its fifth year.

== Writer ==
Estrin has written hundreds of articles and posts for The New York Times. His writing has also appeared in National Geographic Magazine, Aperture's "The Photographers Playbook" and several other books.

== Films ==
Estrin is the co-executive producer of "Underfire: The Untold Story of Pfc. Tony Vaccaro," a documentary film shown on HBO in November 2016. He also appeared in the film, directed by Max Lewkowicz, as well in the documentary, "The Many Sad Fates of Mr. Taledano," produced by Heartland Films.

== Teacher ==
Estrin is an adjunct professor at the City University of New York Graduate School of Journalism where he teaches transmedia storytelling and photography. He also teaches at the School of Visual Arts' Masters Program in Digital Photography in New York.
