= 3066 McFadden =

Stony background asteroid from the central regions of the asteroid belt

Discovery
- Discovered by: E. Bowell
- Discovery site: Anderson Mesa Stn.
- Discovery date: 1 March 1984

Designations
- Named after: Lucy-Ann McFadden (American astronomer)
- Alternative designations: 1984 EO · 1933 MA; 1936 FE · 1941 MA; 1952 FW · 1968 FQ; 1976 GC · 1980 EG_{2}
- Minor planet category: main-belt · (inner) background

Orbital characteristics
- Epoch 23 March 2018 (JD 2458200.5)
- Uncertainty parameter 0
- Observation arc: 81.60 yr (29,806 d)
- Aphelion: 2.8636 AU
- Perihelion: 2.1875 AU
- Semi-major axis: 2.5255 AU
- Eccentricity: 0.1339
- Orbital period (sidereal): 4.01 yr (1,466 d)
- Mean anomaly: 328.54°
- Mean motion: 0° 14^{m} 44.16^{s} / day
- Inclination: 15.574°
- Longitude of ascending node: 175.69°
- Argument of perihelion: 188.31°

Physical characteristics
- Mean diameter: 13.526±0.046 km 14.805±0.051 km 14.896 km 14.90 km (taken); 15.27±0.53 km 15.63±0.44 km
- Synodic rotation period: 13.798±0.002 h (Note: Lightcurve plot of 3066 McFadden, Palmer Divide Observatory, B. D. Warner (2005) rotation period of 13.798±0.002 hours with a brightness amplitude of 0.13±0.02 mag. Quality code of 3. Summary figures at the LCDB and publication.)
- Geometric albedo: 0.240±0.015; 0.2541; 0.2617±0.0766; 0.275±0.072; 0.363±0.033
- Spectral type: S (assumed)
- Absolute magnitude (H): 11.10 · 11.20; 11.24; 11.24±0.08; 11.41±0.25

3066 McFadden, provisional designation 1984 EO, is a stony background asteroid from the central regions of the asteroid belt, approximately 15 kilometers (9.3 miles) in diameter. It was discovered on 1 March 1984, by American astronomer Edward Bowell at the Anderson Mesa Station near Tucson, Arizona. It was named for American planetary scientist Lucy-Ann McFadden. The assumed S-type asteroid has a rotation period of 13.8 hours.

== Orbit and classification ==
McFadden is a non-family asteroid from the main belt's background population. It orbits the Sun in the central asteroid belt at a distance of 2.2–2.9 AU once every 4 years (1,466 days; semi-major axis of 2.53 AU). Its orbit has an eccentricity of 0.13 and an inclination of 16° with respect to the ecliptic.

The asteroid was first observed as 1933 MA at the Simeis Observatory in June 1933. The body's observation arc begins as 1936 FE at Uccle Observatory in March 1936, or 48 years prior to its official discovery observation at Anderson Mesa.

== Naming ==
This minor planet was named after Lucy-Ann McFadden (born 1952), a planetary scientist at the University of Maryland at the time of naming. Her research included the similarities between the spectra of meteorites and near-Earth objects. The official naming citation was published by the Minor Planet Center on 14 April 1987 (M.P.C. 11748).

== Physical characteristics ==
McFadden is an assumed, stony S-type asteroid.

=== Rotation period ===
In June 2005, a rotational lightcurve of McFadden was obtained from photometric observations by American astronomer Brian Warner at his Palmer Divide Observatory in Colorado. Lightcurve analysis gave a rotation period of 13.798 hours with a brightness amplitude of 0.13 magnitude (U=3).

=== Diameter and albedo ===
According to the surveys carried out by the Japanese Akari satellite and the NEOWISE mission of NASA's Wide-field Infrared Survey Explorer, McFadden measures between 13.526 and 15.63 kilometers in diameter and its surface has an albedo between 0.240 and 0.363.

The Collaborative Asteroid Lightcurve Link adopts Petr Pravec's revised WISE data with an albedo of 0.2541 and a diameter of 14.90 kilometers based on an absolute magnitude of 11.24.
