= Timothy Shary =

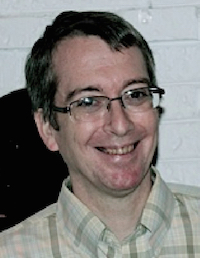
- Tim Shary
- Born: August 17, 1967 (age 59)
- Occupation: film scholar

Timothy Shary (born August 17, 1967) is an American film scholar, and a leading authority on the representation of youth in movies. He has been a professor at the University of Massachusetts, Clark University, and the University of Oklahoma. He is now a professor at Eastern Florida State College.

Shary has focused on the representational politics of age and gender. His essays and reviews have appeared in Men and Masculinities, Film Quarterly, Sight & Sound, Journal of Film and Video, Film Criticism, Journal of Popular Film and Television, Wide Angle, and The Journal of Popular Culture.

== Education ==
Shary earned his B.A. degree in 1991 at Hampshire College in Amherst, Massachusetts, where his work focused on cinema studies. His Division III project (a thesis written for graduation) examined voyeurism in Alfred Hitchcock's films, and he also wrote "A History of Student Activities and Achievements at Hampshire College".

Shary went on to earn an M.A. in Film Scholarship at Ohio University in 1992, where his thesis was entitled The Present Personal Truth: Three Properties of Video and Their Effect on the Reception of Contemporary Narrative Cinema. Much of that thesis was published in two journal articles: “Present Personal Truths: The Alternative Phenomenology of Video in I’ve Heard the Mermaids Singing” and “Video as Accessible Artifact and Artificial Access: The Early Films of Atom Egoyan”.

In 1998, Shary earned his Ph.D. in Communication at the University of Massachusetts, with a dissertation entitled Generation Multiplex: The Image of Youth in American Cinema, 1981-1996. This study would be the foundation for his first book in 2002.

== Published works ==
As Shary completed his doctoral studies and began teaching at Clark University, he published articles and reviews such as "The Teen Film and its Methods of Study" (Journal of Popular Film and Television), "Reification and Loss in Postmodern Puberty: The Cultural Logic of Fredric Jameson and Young Adult Movies" (Postmodernism in the Cinema), and "Film Genres and the Cinematic Image of Youth– A College Course File" (Journal of Film and Video).

Shary had argued for the legitimacy of teen movies as a codified and potent American film genre throughout his early work, as evident in his anthologized essay “Teen Films: The Cinematic Image of Youth”, first published in Film Genre Reader III (ed. Barry Keith in 2003 and reprinted in 2012). He also began specific studies of gender representation and youth with articles such as “The Nerdly Girl and Her Beautiful Sister: Torments of Intelligence for Teen Movie Girls” (Sugar, Spice, and Everything Nice: Cinemas of Girlhood) and “Bad Boys and Hollywood Hype: Gendered Conflicts in Juvenile Delinquency Depictions” (Where the Boys Are: Cinemas of Masculinity and Youth).

His work on gender continued in studies of youth cinema such as “Virgin Springs: A Survey of Teen Films' Quest for Sexcess” (Virgin Territory: Representing Sexual Inexperience in Film), “Buying Me Love: 1980s Class-Clash Teen Romances” (The Journal of Popular Culture), and “‘The only place to go is inside’: Confusions about Sexuality and Class from Kids to Superbad,” which has been published in numerous editions of Popping Culture since 1996.

Shary continued with The Films of Amy Heckerling, which he co-edited with Frances Smith as part of the ReFocus series by the University of Edinburgh Press in 2016. He edited the collection Millennial Masculinity in 2013, based on his wider interests in gender on screen.

In recent years, Shary began studying older characters in American cinema. His first publication of this research was “The Politics of Aging in the May–December Romance Plot” (Quarterly Review of Film and Video). He completed a new book with Nancy McVittie, Fade to Gray: Aging in American Cinema, which was published by the University of Texas Press in September, 2016.

Shary authored a book-length study of the 2014 Richard Linklater film Boyhood (part of the Routledge series Cinema and Youth Cultures), which was published in 2017. He recently co-edited another collection in the ReFocus series with Frances Smith, on the films of John Hughes, and edited Cinemas of Boyhood: Masculinity, Sexuality, Nationality, both in 2021.

== Books ==
- Generation Multiplex: The Image of Youth in Contemporary American Cinema (2002)
- Teen Movies: American Youth on Screen (2005)
- Youth Culture in Global Cinema (2007) co-edited with Alexandra Seibel
- Millennial Masculinity: Men in Contemporary American Cinema (2013), editor
- Generation Multiplex: The Image of Youth in American Cinema Since 1980 (2014)
- Collection on filmmaker Amy Heckerling with Frances Smith (2016)
- Fade to Gray: Aging in American Cinema with Nancy McVittie (2016)
- Boyhood: A Young Life on Screen (2017)
- Collection on filmmaker John Hughes with Frances Smith (2021)
- Cinemas of Boyhood: Masculinity, Sexuality, Nationality(2021), editor

== Recognition ==
- The Ohio University College of Fine Arts awarded Shary its Distinguished Alumni of the Year honor from its School of Film in 2004.
- Shary gave the featured interview in the Independent Film Channel documentary Indie Sex: Teens (2007).
- Shary was a delegate to the inaugural Geena Davis Institute on Gender in Media in 2008.
- In December 2016, Shary was invited to present four American teen films in a series entitled The Tender Age, organized by the Russian publishing house Séance at the Rodina Theater in St. Petersburg, Russia. While in attendance, he presented a lecture for the first class of the St. Petersburg School of New Cinema entitled "Adolescence on the Outskirts: The Liminal Nature of Youth in American Teen Cinema.”
