= Amy K. Nelson =

American journalist (born 1978)

Amy K. Nelson (born July 16, 1978) is the founder and CEO of Beautiful Bipolar, an event production company based in New Orleans, LA, that destigmatizes mental illness and focuses on mental health, healing and wellness.

A former senior correspondent at SB Nation, Nelson is known as a writer and reporter for ESPN.com's Enterprise Unit. She also served as a moderator for ESPN's First Take program, and has appeared on SportsCenter, ESPNews, Baseball Tonight and Outside the Lines.

She is also a former American freelance multimedia journalist based in New York City. Her work has appeared in Slate, Deadspin, Out Magazine, The Hairpin and Animal New York, among others.

== Early life ==
Nelson was born on the North Shore of Massachusetts and is a graduate of Hampshire College with a Bachelor of Arts degree in photojournalism, sociology, and psychology.

== Professional career ==
After graduating in 2000, Nelson began working for SportsTicker, a now defunct sports news service, that was the official statistician of Minor League Baseball. Nelson began her career as a writer, writing for the news service's editorial branch. Nelson also freelanced for SportsTicker in the Boston area, where she was based. This entailed calling in with score or stat updates to the main office in New Jersey, getting quotes from athletes and writing stories.

In 2004, Nelson left SportsTicker and worked for the Associated Press before joining ESPN.

=== ESPN ===
Nelson wrote for ESPN for seven years from 2004 to October 17, 2011. She began at ESPN: The Magazine in late 2004 and transitioned to ESPN.com in 2005. Covering baseball, Nelson worked her way from feature writing to include frequent TV appearances on ESPN shows such as Jim Rome Is Burning and First Take.

Some of her more notable pieces were featured on Outside the Lines, including a profile on Logan Morrison and another on Jim Joyce and Armando Galarraga's near perfect game.

On September 19, 2009, ESPN announced the launch of ESPNBoston.com. Nelson was hired as a regular contributor and Red Sox beat reporter for the new site.

=== SB Nation ===
Nelson joined SB Nation on November 3, 2011, as their senior correspondent and to work on their new video channel hosted at YouTube.

As part of the channel launch, Nelson produced and hosted her own show, Full Nelson. The short-documentary based program covers a wide range of topics, from a Brooklyn arm-wrestling championship to a story on minor-league-baseball part-owner Bill Murray.

Nelson's most recent piece was an oral history on the Costacos Brothers and their sports poster empire.

=== Freelance ===
Nelson's freelance work includes a story for The Hairpin, about women in the sports media and their systematic disadvantage. Sports Illustrated media critic Richard Deitsch used it as a platform for a larger roundtable discussion on women in sports media.

Other notable pieces include her 2014 search for Jeff Gillooly, figure skater Tonya Harding's ex-husband who planned the attack on Nancy Kerrigan 20 years ago prior to the 1994 Winter Olympics in Lillehammer. Nelson was the only journalist to interview Gillooly and appeared in ESPN's 30 for 30 documentary The Price of Gold.

Her written and video piece of a black Santa Claus at Macy's flagship store in New York City received pickup from CNN.

Nelson also covered the uprisings in Baltimore and Ferguson, the latter of which garnered her national attention. After moving to New Orleans, she wrote about artist BMike and his outdoor Black history art museum and public art project, Exhibit Be.

== Mental health work ==
Two weeks after Hurricane Ida hit, Nelson had a Mental Health Mutual Aid event through her company, Beautiful Bipolar. The event served over 200 hot meals and offered support sessions with counselors.
