= David M. Hall =

American writer and corporate trainer

- Born: Philadelphia, US
- Occupations: American writer and corporate trainer

David M. Hall is an American writer and corporate trainer. Hall is most notable for his book, Allies at Work: Creating a Lesbian, Gay, Bisexual and Transgender Inclusive Work Environment. Lisa Sherman, Vice President of Logo, has said that "Allies at Work should be required reading for every corporate leader in America.". This book was featured in an interview with Hall on the online radio show Diversity Matters.

Hall is also the editor of Taking Sides: Family and Personal Relationships, a publication by McGraw-Hill. In 2010, Dr. Hall was awarded the Gay, Lesbian and Straight Education Network Educator of the Year Runner-Up award. He also won a top award in the state for civics curriculum development during this same year. This recognition was awarded by the Pennsylvania Department of Education and PennCORD, a civics education program championed by federal judge and Pennsylvania First Lady Marjorie Rendell.

In February 2012, Hall wrote an article for CNN, about the television show Glee, in which he expressed the following opinion:

The storyline on "Glee" captures something larger that we are seeing with a new generation of allies (allies are people who support LGBT rights but aren't LGBT themselves).

— David M. Hall, February 24, 2012

== Education ==
David M. Hall was born in Philadelphia. He received a doctorate in education from Widener University, a master's degree in education from the University of Pennsylvania, and his bachelor's degree from Hampshire College. He also attended Ringling Bros. and Barnum and & Bailey Clown College and received a Bachelor's of Fun Arts (BFA).

== Career ==
Hall currently resides in Bucks County, Pennsylvania, where he facilitates a civics program at North Penn High School. In the program, students present proposals for change which are evaluated by a panel of community leaders. Hall helped found Out & Equal Philadelphia and sits as a member of the Executive Council. Hall has provided training for companies including Merck & Co., JP Morgan Chase, The Hershey Company, University of Pennsylvania, The United States Department of Energy, and The Public Service Electric and Gas Company (PSE&G).

== Publications ==
Books
Allies at Work: Creating a Lesbian, Gay, Bisexual and Transgender Inclusive Work Environment, (2009). Out & Equal, San Francisco: CA.

Taking Sides: Clashing Views in Family and Personal Relationships, 8th Edition, Editor (2010). McGraw Hill: Dubuque, IA.

Instructor's Manual for Taking Sides: Clashing Views in Family and Personal Relationships, 8th Edition (2010). McGraw Hill: Dubuque, IA.

Mobile Applications
Allies at Work for the iPhone, iPad, and Droid.

BullyShield for the iPhone, iPad, and Droid.

Chapters & Articles
"The availability of sexual health services makes some college campuses healthier than others," Taking Sides: Clashing Views in Human Sexuality (2009, 2007). McGraw Hill: Dubuque, IA.

"Corporations should ensure equal rights for their lesbian, gay, bisexual, and transgender employees," Taking Sides: Clashing Views in Human Sexuality (2009). McGraw Hill: Dubuque, IA.

"Book Review of The New Gay Teenager," American Journal for Sexuality Education (2006).

"Forming a Gay Straight Alliance Without Controversy," SIECUS Report (2003).
