= Lisa Arie =

American author, motivational speaker, experiential designer

- Education: Hampshire College
- Occupations: Executive, author, motivational speaker
- Website: vistacaballo.com

Lisa Arie is an American author, motivational speaker, experiential designer, and entrepreneur.

== Biography ==
Arie was born in Bronxville, New York and holds a B.A. from Hampshire College. In her early career, Lisa Arie was an award-winning advertising executive in New York City working at DDB, GSD&M, and The Richards Group. She produced the original Tom Bodett spots for Motel 6. The campaign was selected by Advertising Age magazine as one of the Top 100 Advertising Campaigns of the Twentieth Century. In 1994, she became the Founder and CEO of both Beaucoup, an independent production department, and Talent Solutions, an independent business affairs department.

She has been a speaker at The Aspen Institute. Arie has been featured in media outlets including The Huffington Post. She is also a Fortune 70 Leadership Thought Leader.

Arie founded The Vista Caballo Experiential Learning Center on her 160-acre ranch in Dove Creek, Colorado. She operated with facility with her husband, Jess. Vista Caballo is a certified B Corporation.

== Bibliography ==
- Arie, Lisa (2010). Crossing The Silly Bridge. Dove Creek, CO: Vista Caballo. pp. 28 pages. ISBN 978-0615414881.
