= Alia Amirali =

Pakistani politician

- عالیہ امیرعلی
- Born: November 5, 1984 (age 41); Islamabad, Pakistan
- Occupations: Lecturer, Feminist, Political worker, Former Deputy General Secretary, Punjab unit of Awami Workers Party (2016–2019)
- Notable work: Founding member of Women Democratic Front
- Parent(s): Pervez Hoodbhoy, Hajra Ahmed

Alia Amirali (Urdu: عالیہ امیرعلی; born November 5, 1984) is a Pakistani left-wing political worker, activist and academic working on issues of gender and political participation. She has been working as Deputy General Secretary for the Punjab National Unit of Awami Workers Party in Pakistan (2016–2019). She is also a lecturer in Gender Studies at Quaid-i-Azam University, Islamabad. She is a PhD candidate at London School of Economics, Gender Studies department.

== Early life and education ==
Amirali is daughter of Pakistani activist and physicist, Pervez Hoodbhoy and Hajra Ahmed, niece of renowned philosopher and intellectual Eqbal Ahmed. Amirali was born in Islamabad and got early schooling from Khaldunia High School, Islamabad. She did her Bachelor's in Liberal Arts from Hampshire College, USA in 2006. She did M.Phil in anthropology from Quaid-i-Azam University in 2010. She is enrolled in PhD program at the London School of Economics and Political Science.

== Political beginning ==
Amirali has been attending political rallies and demonstrations since her early age. According to an interview, she said that she got involved in organizing in the local anti-war effort in 2001 during the U.S. invasion of Afghanistan. She went abroad for college between 2002 and 2006, and returned to Pakistan in between during the climax of the Okara peasants’ movement, which had resurfaced at the time. Ever since she has been involved in different movements like Katchi Abadi Alliance (protesting evictions of informal settlements in Islamabad).

=== Awami Workers Party ===
Amirali was initially associated with a political group known as "Peoples’ Rights Movement" which later merged with other Left parties leading to formation of a new political party in Pakistan, called Awami Workers Party. Amirali worked as an active political worker of AWP Islamabad-Rawalpindi unit and served as deputy general secretary of Punjab AWP.

== Women's political organizer ==
Amirali mostly worked with the women among student, peasant or the slum dweller communities and tried to give political voice to their invisible existence. She has worked extensively for women's participation in politics.

=== Women Democratic Front ===
Amirali is a founding member of Women democratic front saying that women, regardless of whether they are elite or non elite, need to struggle in a country like Pakistan where patriarchy is so entrenched and public spaces are so male dominated.

== Student rights ==
Amirali was responsible for the upsurge in student activism after a long hiatus.

=== National Students Federation ===
Amirali was also the General Secretary of National Students Federation Punjab from 2008 to 2012. NSF remained inactive and without a formal organisational presence in Pakistan between the late 1980s and when it was reactivated in the late 2000s, with Alia a major factor in the mobilisation of young people in general, and students in particular during and the anti-emergency protests of 2007. The NSF later merged with other student organisations to become the Progressive Students Federation.

== Conferences and seminars ==
She has been a speaker at multiple panels and conferences. She was a speaker at the Socialist Alliance 9th National Conference at Green Left Weekly 2013 Fighting Fund, Australia. She has also been guest speaker at IDRAC, Habib University where spoke of the different movements, as well as the lack of representation of the largest and most exploited section of labour-women.

She has been working as a lecturer and researcher for a number of years.

== Publications ==
She has published "Balochistan : a case study of Pakistan's peacemaking praxis" in which she explored and analysed why many peace processes failed and how the state penetrated into the province of Balochistan.
