= Concetta Damante =

Italian politician (born 1972)

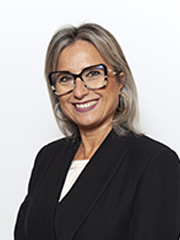
- Damante in 2022

Member of the Senate
- Incumbent
- Assumed office 13 October 2022
- Constituency: Sicily – P01

Personal details
- Born: 5 February 1972 (age 54)
- Party: Five Star Movement

Concetta Damante (born 5 February 1972) is an Italian politician serving as a member of the Senate since 2022. From 2019 to 2022, she was a member of the Sicilian Regional Assembly.
