= Paige Fischer =

Environmental scientist

Alexandra Paige Fischer
- Born: Oregon
- Education: Hampshire College (BA); Oregon State University (MS, PhD)
- Known for: Fire Science, Forest Ecology
- Awards: National Science Foundation Coupled Human and Natural Systems Fellowship (2012), USDA Forest Service Science Findings Award (2012), Influential Woman in Fire Science (2018)
- Scientific career
- Fields: Human Dimensions of Climate Science
- Website: https://sites.google.com/umich.edu/fischerresearchgroup/research

Alexandra Paige Fischer, who goes by her middle name, Paige, is an environmental scientist from the Pacific Northwest whose research focuses mainly on the human dimensions of environmental changes. She is especially interested in forest ecology and conservation. She is currently an assistant professor at the University of Michigan's School for Environment and Sustainability, teaching upper-level classes about analysis methods and social vulnerability to climate change.

== Early life and education ==
Fischer grew up in Oregon and was interested in forests and their effects on humans from a young age. She received her B.A. in Cultural Anthropology from Hampshire College in Amherst, Massachusetts in 1994. She then spent two years at the University of Peradeniya in Sri Lanka as a Fulbright Scholar. There, she studied the local and national policy and the cultural influences relating to and affecting forest management. She later returned to Oregon where she studied at Oregon State University. She earned her M.S. in 2003 and her Ph.D. in 2006, both in the social science of Forest Resources. While completing her PhD, she received the Ford Foundation Community Forestry Research Fellowship, allowing her to conduct research on conservation policy in Willamette Valley forests. After completing her education at Oregon State University, she received the school's Alumnus of the Year Award in 2011. She was recognized for her generous support and contributions to the College of Forestry.

== Career and research ==
=== Professional experience ===
After completing her undergraduate degree, Fischer directed international policy programs relating to forest management for Pacific Environment. After that, she worked as a Research Social Scientist with the Pacific Northwest Research Station of the Forest Service.

Fischer is presently an associate professor at the University of Michigan. There, she teaches classes on data collection methods and analysis, as well as a class on social adaptations to climate change. She actively researches the human dimensions of sustainability and conservation with her students. Her team, called the Fischer Research Group, aims to study human behavior in a scientific manner and is made up of postdoctoral research fellows, PhD students and master's students.

=== Research ===
Fischer's research is focused on climate change as it relates to and is affected by humans. Using both quantitative and qualitative methods to analyze interviews and surveys, she brings scientific understanding to human actions. Her work draws on ideas from the fields of social sciences and human geography along with hard sciences. She aims to understand how and why individuals and organizations are motivated to collaborate, and how cooperation can positively affect resource management and conservation policies.

The Fischer Research Group has many ongoing research projects, with funding from the USDA National Institute of Food and Agriculture, the University of Michigan, the National Science Foundation, the Oregon Department of Fish and Wildlife, and several private organizations. Fischer has also conducted research through previous employers, such as her work as Faculty Research Associate at Oregon State University. She currently has eight ongoing grants relating to her research projects.

Her most cited works are those that integrate scientific understanding of human behavior into studies of natural systems and conservation. For example, some of her work analyzes individual capacities to respond to hazards and changes through organization and collective management. She has also written about the various sociocultural influences on conservation strategies, which again combines her work studying human behaviors as well as natural resources and systems.

==== Notable publications ====
- Charnley, Susan; Fischer, A. Paige; Jones, Eric T. (July 2007). "Integrating traditional and local ecological knowledge into forest biodiversity conservation in the Pacific Northwest". Forest Ecology and Management. 246 (1): 14–28. Bibcode:2007ForEM.246...14C. doi:10.1016/j.foreco.2007.03.047.
- Spies, Thomas A.; White, Eric M.; Kline, Jeffrey D.; Fischer, A. Paige; Ager, Alan; Bailey, John; Bolte, John; Koch, Jennifer; Platt, Emily; Olsen, Christine S.; Jacobs, Derric; Shindler, Bruce; Steen-Adams, Michelle M.; Hammer, Roger (2014). "Examining fire-prone forest landscapes as coupled human and natural systems". Ecology and Society. 19 (3). doi:10.5751/ES-06584-190309. hdl:10535/9689. JSTOR 26269597.
- Fischer, A. Paige; Charnley, Susan (11 April 2012). "Risk and Cooperation: Managing Hazardous Fuel in Mixed Ownership Landscapes". Environmental Management. 49 (6): 1192–1207. Bibcode:2012EnMan..49.1192F. doi:10.1007/s00267-012-9848-z. PMC 3350635. PMID 22525987.
- Paveglio, Travis B.; Moseley, Cassandra; Carroll, Matthew S.; Williams, Daniel R.; Davis, Emily Jane; Fischer, A. Paige (2 April 2015). "Categorizing the Social Context of the Wildland Urban Interface: Adaptive Capacity for Wildfire and Community "Archetypes"". Forest Science. 61 (2): 298–310. doi:10.5849/forsci.14-036.
- Fischer, A Paige; Spies, Thomas A; Steelman, Toddi A; Moseley, Cassandra; Johnson, Bart R; Bailey, John D; Ager, Alan A; Bourgeron, Patrick; Charnley, Susan; Collins, Brandon M; Kline, Jeffrey D; Leahy, Jessica E; Littell, Jeremy S; Millington, James DA; Nielsen-Pincus, Max; Olsen, Christine S; Paveglio, Travis B; Roos, Christopher I; Steen-Adams, Michelle M; Stevens, Forrest R; Vukomanovic, Jelena; White, Eric M; Bowman, David MJS (June 2016). "Wildfire risk as a socioecological pathology". Frontiers in Ecology and the Environment. 14 (5): 276–284. Bibcode:2016FrEE...14..276F. doi:10.1002/fee.1283. hdl:2027.42/120492.

== Awards and honors ==
- Fischer is cited in the journal "Fire" as an influential leader in fire science in 2018. Her work studying effective land management and conservation with the integration of traditional and local ecological knowledge synthesized previous research and suggests models for applying this knowledge.
- Received the Science and Practice of Ecology and Society Award for her manuscript, “A boundary spanning organization for transdisciplinary science on land stewardship: The Stewardship Network of Ann Arbor,” in 2015.
- In 2012, she was given the USDA Forest Service Science Findings Award which recognized her research in Science Findings.
- Granted the National Science Foundation Coupled Human and Natural Systems Fellowship that recognizes outstanding junior scholars in 2012.

== Public engagement ==
Fischer currently serves as a board member for the American Association of Geographers' specialty group called the Human Dimensions of Global Change. This group provides recommendations to the National Science Foundation for better understanding and responding to human influences on the natural world. Additionally, she serves on the Executive Council of the International Association of Society and Natural Resources. This organization works to integrate the social sciences into natural resource policies. Fischer is also affiliated with the Society of American Foresters and the Fulbright Association.
