= Cylin Busby =

American children's writer

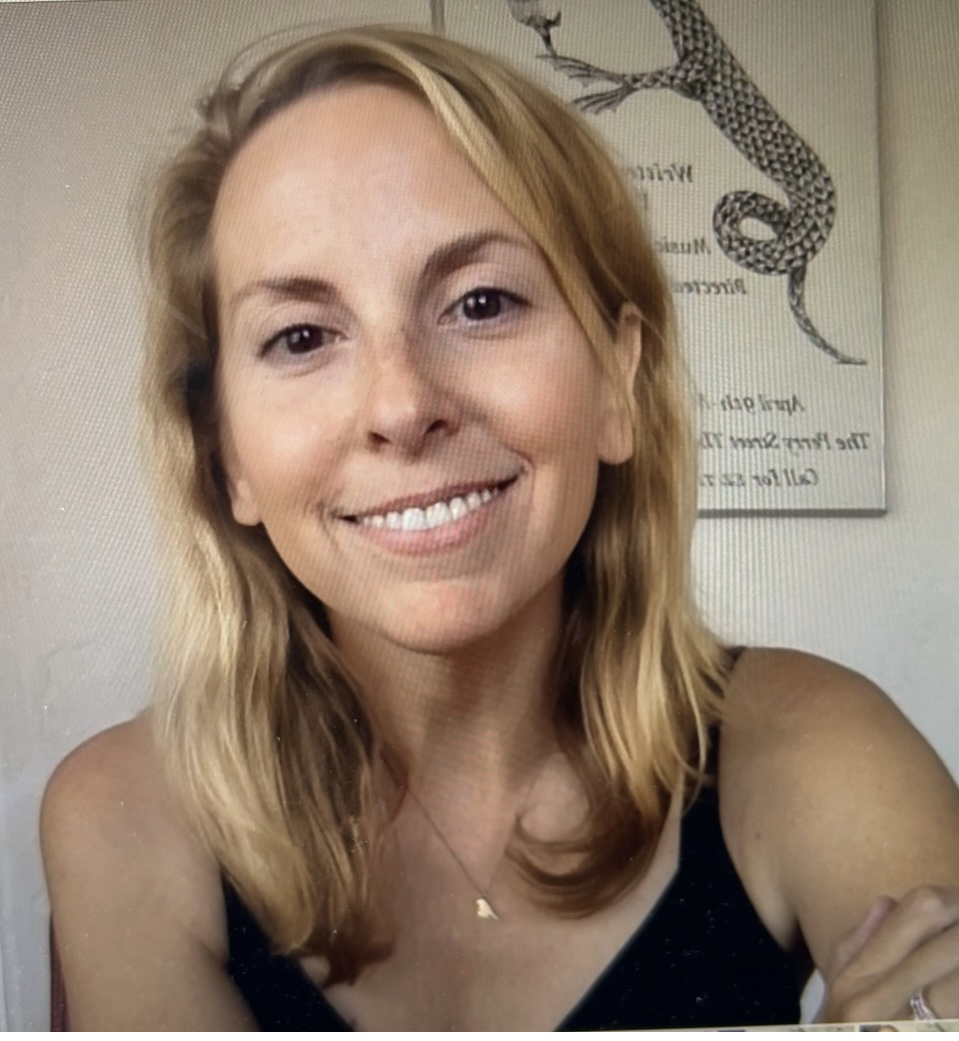
- Busby in 2023
- Born: Falmouth, Massachusetts, USA
- Occupations: Writer, editor
- Writing career
- Period: 1990s-present
- Genres: Young Adult fiction, memoir, supernatural fiction, thriller
- Website: cylinbusby.com

Cylin Busby is an author and screenwriter, known for the best-selling true crime memoir, The Year We Disappeared, written with her father John Busby.

== Early life ==
Born the youngest of three children (she has two older brothers, Eric Busby and Shawn Busby), Cylin grew up in Falmouth on Cape Cod, Massachusetts. In 1979, her police officer father, John Busby, was seriously injured in a shooting. During the resulting investigation, the family was relocated and lived in hiding in Cookeville, Tennessee for five years. Cylin and John co-wrote a memoir about the experience which went on to become a best seller, placing at #3 on the nonfiction lists for The Wall Street Journal and Publishers Weekly. The book also earned #1 best seller placement on Amazon's nonfiction list. Their memoir was featured in 2009 on the CBS television program 48 Hours in an episode titled Live to Tell: The Year We Disappeared and was optioned for a motion picture in 2014.

== Personal ==
In 2022, Cylin had an unexpected encounter with P-22, a famous mountain lion from Griffith Park in Los Angeles, who showed up on her front porch.

== Awards and recognition ==
For The Year We Disappeared

- Publishers Weekly Best Book of 2008
- Cybils Award, Nonfiction, 2008

== Works ==
=== Picture Book ===
- The Bookstore Cat (2020) Illustrations by Charles Santoso
- The White House Cat (2022) Illustrations by Neely Daggett

=== Novels ===
- The Nine Lives of Jacob Tibbs (2016) Illustrations by Gerald Kelley

=== Memoir ===
- The Year We Disappeared: A Father-Daughter Memoir, John and Cylin Busby (2008)

=== Anthology ===
- First Kiss, Then Tell (2008)
