= Vista Caballo =

Corporate retreat facility in Colorado

- Type: Corporation
- Founded: 2005
- Headquarters: Dove Creek, Colorado, United States
- Key people: Lisa Arie, CEO
- Website: VistaCaballo.com

Vista Caballo is a private facility located in Dove Creek, Colorado.

In 2005, Lisa Arie founded Vista Caballo, LLC, a 160-acre ranch, with her husband Jess Arie. Described by Fast Co. magazine as the "CEO whisperer”, the former advertising executive works with horses as a catalyst for entrepreneurs, C-suite executives, directors, managers, team leaders and individuals.

Vista Caballo is a certified B Corporation. Lisa Arie is also the author of Crossing The Silly Bridge, which was published by Vista Caballo.

== Services ==
Vista Caballo provides custom-designed and on-line experiences. The Vista Caballo Signature Experience is designed for leaders seeking transformation. The Vista Caballo Signature Experience helps participants to step outside known comfort zones and propel them forward with focus. A four-week interactive web experience combines all the fundamental principles uncovered during their stay at Vista Caballo, so participants can continue their evolution at home.

Vista Caballo also provides custom-designed engagements for corporate leaders off-site to create tipping points for self-actualization.

== Executives ==
- Lisa Arie, Co-founder/CEO
- Jess Arie, Co-founder
