= Thomas H. Stoner Jr. =

American entrepreneur and writer

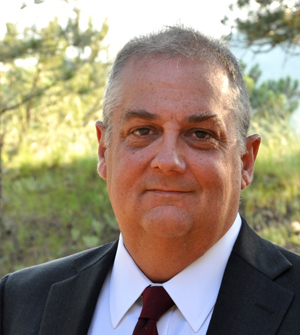
- Stoner in 2013
- Born: January 19, 1960 (age 66); Des Moines, Iowa
- Occupations: environmentalist, economist, financial analyst, author

Thomas H. Stoner Jr. is lead director and a co-founder, along with Nobel laureate David Schimel of the Jet Propulsion Lab (NASA) and other leading climate experts, of Entelligent, a global provider of Smart Climate indexes, predictive equity portfolio analytics and advanced data on climate risk and climate transition. He was CEO of Entelligent from 2017 to October 2023. Prior to Entelligent, Stoner founded Project Butterfly, a research organization that advocates primarily for the global capital markets as a solution to climate change. The research produced by Project Butterfly led to the creation of Entelligent and ultimately yielded two climate risk patents issued by the USPTO. Stoner is also the author of the 2013 book, "Small Change, Big Gains: Reflections of an Energy Entrepreneur," which includes research about transforming the global energy supply to be more reliant on sustainable fuel sources by the end of the century. Stoner has been a promoter of sustainable development for over 30 years, having built, financed and owned and operated renewable energy projects throughout the Americas. He has led three companies in the clean technology space, including one of the original cleantech venture funds backed by international development banks, including the Multilateral Investment Fund, a division of the Inter-American Development Bank.

== Education and personal life ==
Stoner received a master's degree in accounting and finance from the London School of Economics and a B.A. from Hampshire College, Amherst, Massachusetts. In 1988, he married Laurie Larsen; they have two children.

== Career ==
Prior to creating and leading Entelligent as CEO, Stoner was from 2008 to 2010 CEO and chairman of Evergreen Energy (NYSE: EEE), a publicly traded coal and clean coal technology company based in Denver, Colorado.

From 1998 to 2008, Stoner was CEO of Econergy International, a carbon markets consultancy and owner/operator of renewable energy projects throughout the Americas. Econergy International floated on the London Stock Exchange AIM in 2006. Econergy was an independent power developer of renewable energy projects, including wind farms, small hydro and methane-fired power generation facilities throughout the Americas as well as one of the leading carbon emissions traders under the Kyoto Protocol. Under Stoner's leadership, Econergy developed the first methodology submitted to the governing body of the clean development mechanism of the United Nations Framework Convention on Climate Change. Stoner led the sale of Econergy to GDF Suez, one of the largest utilities in the world. While at Econergy, Stoner helped five international development banks develop the CleanTechFund, a $25 million private equity fund focused on small-scale energy generation and energy efficiency projects in Latin America. He was senior manager of the fund from its formation in 2004 to 2008. Prior to Econergy, Stoner founded and was president of Highland Energy Group, a national energy service company (ESCO) providing demand side management services to public utilities, such as the Public Service Company of Colorado, Duke Power, and Texas Utilities. Stoner led the sale of the company to Eastern Utilities, formerly a NYSE-traded public utility based in Boston, Massachusetts.

== Publications and appearances ==
- What Climate Change Means for Investors
- Donald Trump is about to become an even bigger champion of coal and fracking
- Investors must adjust their portfolios now for a changing climate
- Why Big Oil might secretly wish for a carbon tax
- Opinion: Exxon Mobil cover-up case shows why energy investors need a new strategy
- Paris: Subsidies, taxes and the energy investor
- China Still Needs to Focus on Renewable Energy Despite Economic Slowdown
- The problem with Obama's clean-energy plan
- Panelist at Livingston Securities Advanced Energy Conference Denver, CO
- Panelist at 2015 Burridge Conference, Burridge Center for Finance at University of Colorado Boulder, CO
- Instructor at Viridis Graduate Institute Ecopsychology and Environmental Humanities course: Economics, Humans & Environment
- Invited member for "Committee on Determinants of Market Adoption of Advanced Energy Efficiency and Clean Energy Technologies" at the National Academy of Sciences
- Small Change Big Gains: Reflections of an Energy Entrepreneur, 2013. ISBN 1626340021 556p.
- A Financial Model for Evaluating Projects with Performance Contracts Report to the Energy Efficiency Financial Task Force
- The Most Important Climate Change Question: How Will Investors React?
- Smart Grid: On a Path Toward Climate Stability?
- Divestment and Climate Change: Thomas Stoner at TEDxHampshire
- Carbon Taxes Shifts us From Polluting to Non-Polluting
- The Advantage of Using a Climate Risk Score Ranking During Periods of Energy Price Volatility
- Tree-huggers and capitalists can agree on fossil-fuel disclosure for companies
