= Patricia Klindienst =

American writer, and independent scholar

- Education: Stanford University; Hampshire College
- Occupations: Writer; Independent scholar.

Patricia Klindienst is an American writer, and independent scholar. She graduated from Stanford University, with a Ph.D. She taught at Yale University.

== Awards ==
- 2007 American Book Award
- 2008 Phillip and Eric Heiner Endowed Fellowship, Virginia Center for Creative Arts

== Works ==
- Lynn A. Higgins; Brenda R. Silver, eds. (1993). "The Voice of the Shuttle Is Ours". Rape and Representation. Columbia University Press. ISBN 978-0-231-07267-0.
- "Ritual Work on Human Flesh: Livy's Lucretia and the Rape of the Body Politic," Helios 17, Spring 1990
- Phillipa Berry; Andrew Wernick, eds. (1992). "Intolerable Language: Jesus and the Woman Taken in Adultery". Shadow of Spirit: Postmodernism and Religion.
- "Three Moments Upon Waking", Mississippi Review, June 2003
- "A Punjabi Garden, Part I, II, III", Society of Mutual Autopsy Review

=== Books ===
- The Earth Knows My Name: Food, Culture, & Sustainability in the Gardens of Ethnic Americans. Beacon Press. 2006. ISBN 978-0-8070-8562-2.

=== Anthologies ===
- Marjorie B. Garber; Nancy J. Vickers, eds. (2003). "Rape and Silence in the Medusa Story". The Medusa reader. Routledge. ISBN 978-0-415-90099-7.
- Diane Wood Middlebrook; Marilyn Yalom, eds. (1985). "Epilogue: Philomela's Loom". Coming to light: American women poets in the twentieth century. University of Michigan Press. p. 254. ISBN 978-0-472-08061-8. "Patricia Klindienst."
- Margaret Homans, ed. (1993). "The Authority of Illusion: Feminism and Fascism in Virginia Woolf's Between the Acts". Virginia Woolf: a collection of critical essays. Prentice Hall. ISBN 978-0-13-953209-2.
