= Lucy-Ann McFadden =

American astronomer and planetary scientist

Lucy McFadden
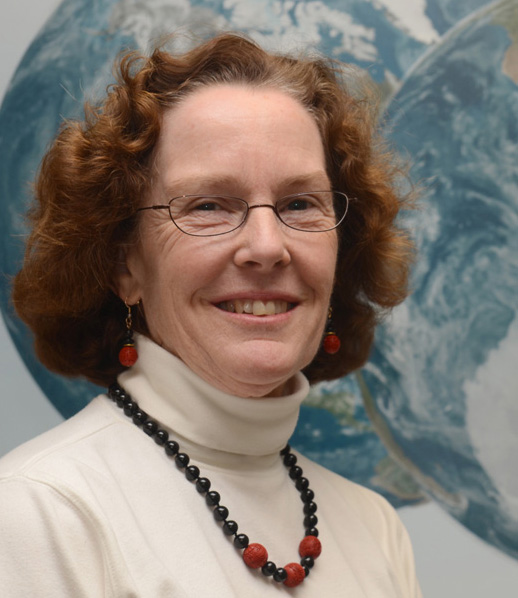
- Born: 1952 (age 73–74); New York City, U.S.
- Education: Hampshire College (BA); Massachusetts Institute of Technology (MS); University of Hawaiʻi (PhD)
- Website: deepimpact.astro.umd.edu/science/bios/lmcfadden.html

Lucy-Ann Adams McFadden (born 1952) is an American astronomer and planetary scientist. An employee of the National Aeronautics and Space Administration, she also founded the Science, Discovery & the Universe Program within the University of Maryland, and the Explore-It-All Science Center, a children's science program.

== Biography ==
McFadden was born in New York City in 1952. Her studies culminated in a bachelor's degree from Hampshire College (1974), Master's in earth and planetary science from Massachusetts Institute of Technology (1977), and a Ph.D. in geology and geophysics from the University of Hawaiʻi (1983) with the dissertation Spectral reflectance of near-Earth asteroids: implications for composition, origin and evolution. She has held positions at the University of Maryland, College Park, California Space Institute at the University of California, San Diego, and Space Telescope Science Institute. At NASA, McFadden has been an investigator for the Dawn mission to 4 Vesta and Ceres; and the Deep Impact and EPOXI programs. She has been a science team member for the Near Earth Asteroid Rendezvous mission; a member of the 2007-2008 ANSMET expedition; a member of the Almahata Sitta meteorite expedition (Northern Sudan, 2009); a leader of the NASA Goddard higher education and university programs (2010); and director of the Education and Public Outreach program for the Deep Impact and Dawn missions.

== Selected works ==
- 1977, Visible Spectral Reflectance Measurements of the Galilean Satellites of Jupiter (MORE)
- 1999, Encyclopedia of the solar system (with Paul Robert Weissman; T V Johnson)

== Awards and honors ==
- 2015 – AAAS Fellow in Astronomy
- 2012 – NASA Group Achievement Award Dawn Vesta Operations Team
- 2011 – NASA Group Achievement Award EPOXI Science Team
- 2009 – National Science Foundation Antarctica Science Service Medal
- 2009 – NASA Group Achievement Award EPOXI Project Team
- 2009 – NASA Group Achievement Award Dawn Science Operations Team,
- 2005 – Space Frontier Foundation Vision to Reality Award- Deep Impact Team
- 2005 – Geological Society of Washington, Best Presentation Award
- 1987 – asteroid 3066 McFadden named in her honor

== Bibliography ==
- Press, Jaques Cattell (1982). American Men and Women of Science: The physical and biological sciences. Bowker.
