= Concetta Mason =

American glass artist

Concetta Mason (born 1952) is an American glass artist.

Her work is included in the collections of the Seattle Art Museum, the Cooper Hewitt, Smithsonian Design Museum the Hunter Museum of American Art, and the Metropolitan Museum of Art.
