= Eric Schocket =

Eric Schocket (1966–2006) was an English professor. He served as associate professor of American literature at Hampshire College in Amherst, Massachusetts. He wrote primarily on issues of class. In Vanishing Moments: Class and American Literature, Schocket examined the way in which class-conscious American literature (such as by Herman Melville, Rebecca Harding Davis, William Howells, and Langston Hughes) confronted and addressed American denial of issues of social stratification.

Schocket completed a BA at UC Berkeley, and a PhD (American literature) at Stanford University.

After a months-long battle with leukemia, Schocket died on September 3, 2006. He is survived by his wife, Alison Greene, and his two children, Benjamin and Margot Schocket-Greene.

== Select publications ==
- "Proletarian Paperbacks: The Little Blue Books and Working-Class Culture" College Literature, 2002 Fall; 29 (4): 67–78. (journal article)
- "Redefining American Proletarian Literature: Mexican Americans and the Challenge to the Tradition of Radical Dissent" Journal of American & Comparative Cultures, 2001 Spring-Summer; 24 (1–2): 59–69. (journal article)
- "'Discovering Some New Race': Rebecca Harding Davis's 'Life in the Iron Mills' and the Literary Emergence of Working-Class Whiteness" PMLA: Publications of the Modern Language Association of America, 2000 Jan; 115 (1): 46–59. (journal article)
- "Undercover Explorations of the 'Other Half'; Or, the Writer as Class Transvestite" Representations, 1998 Fall; 64: 109–33. (journal article)
