= Elaine Mayes =

American photographer (born 1936)

- Born: October 1, 1936 (age 89)
- Education: San Francisco Art Institute; Stanford University
- Occupation: Photographer
- Website: www.elainemayesphoto.com

Elaine Mayes (born October 1, 1936) is an American photographer and a retired professor at New York University's Tisch School of the Arts.

== Academia ==
Beginning in 1968, she taught at the University of Minnesota, and in 1971 joined Jerome Liebling as part of the founding faculty at Hampshire College, where she taught for ten years. Her students included documentary filmmakers Ken Burns, Michel Negroponte, Roger Sherman, Buddy Squires, Kirk Simon, and Karen Goodman. In 1976, Mayes, and former students Burns and Sherman, founded a production company called Florentine Films in Walpole, New Hampshire. The company's name was borrowed from Mayes' hometown of Florence, Massachusetts. She left the company after 1 year.

In 2009 Hampshire established an endowment in Mayes' name to support student projects in film, photography and video. Mayes also taught at Pratt Institute, The International Center of Photography, Bard College and New York University where she retired as Chair of the Photography Department in the Tisch School of the Arts in 2000.

== Subject matter ==
Known for her portraits of San Francisco's Haight-Ashbury residents in 1967-8 and for her iconic images of rock and roll performers in the late 1960s, Mayes' subject matter has also included landscapes and conceptual projects including her series, Autolandscapes, made with a National Endowment for the Arts Fellowship from a moving car while traveling across the country in 1971. She also photographed the New York downtown rock scene of the 1980s. In 1982 she received a New York State CAPS grant. In 1985 she and No Theater of Northampton received a Massachusetts State Foundation for the Arts grant in support of a collaborative work, 'Photoplay.'

== Collections ==
Mayes' photographic work is included in the permanent collections of the Metropolitan Museum of Art, The Museum of Modern Art, The Museum of Fine Arts, Boston, The San Francisco Museum of Modern Art, the Telfair Museum of Art in Savannah, Georgia and a number of other art institutions across the United States.

Her videography was included in "Silverlake Life" (1992), an award-winning documentary that observed the struggles of film maker Tom Joslin and his partner with AIDS. Mayes' Hawaii photographs were exhibited at the Honolulu Museum of Art Spalding House (formerly known as The Contemporary Museum, Honolulu) in 2003. In the same year her book of photographs of the Monterey Pop Festival, "It Happened In Monterey", was published by Britannia Press. A selection of these photographs was included in the Criterion 2002 DVD release "The Complete Monterey Pop" along with commentary by Mayes. Her Haight Ashbury portraits were exhibited at the Steven Kasher Gallery in Manhattan, and her work was included in group shows at MOMA. In 2010 her work was included at SFMOMA's 75th Anniversary Exhibition. Her 2014 book "Recently" grew out of her "unexpected nomadic life that lasted from 2006 until 2013. The photographs were taken in response to what I saw and experienced and can be seen as a visual diary." In 2017 her photographs appeared in the De Young museum show "The Summer of Love Experience."

== Fellowships and grants ==
In 1978 she received two NEA Fellowships, including an individual grant and support for participation in a Survey Grant that resulted in The Long Island Project, sponsored by Apeiron Workshops, now housed at Hofstra University.

In 1991 Mayes received a Guggenheim Fellowship to photograph in Hawaii, and with an Atherton Foundation grant (2003) published this work in a limited edition book titled "Ki'i No Hawai'i" in 2009.
