= Dede Wilson (baker) =

American baker and cookbook author

Dédé Wilson
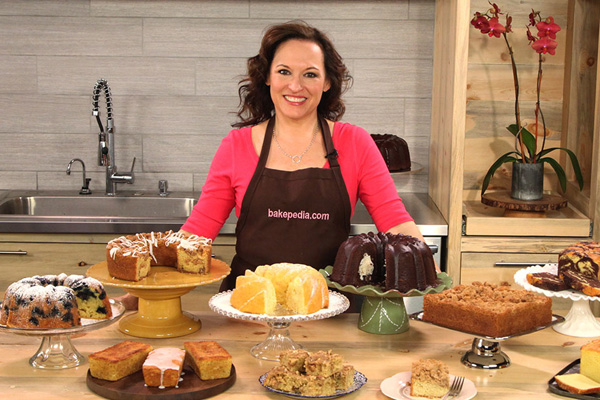
- Dédé Wilson in 2015
- Born: 1960 or 1961 (age 64–65)
- Education: Hampshire College (1979)
- Occupations: Baker, cookbook author, host
- Children: 3
- Website: https://www.dedewilson.com/

Dédé Wilson (born 1960 or 1961) is an American baker and cookbook author.

== Work ==
Wilson studied restaurant management at Hampshire College, graduating in 1979. She was a contributing editor in the food magazine Bon Appétit. She has hosted two CreateTV shows, Seasonings with Dédé Wilson and The Holiday Table, and appeared on The Today Show and The View. Her first cookbook, The Wedding Cake Book, was published in 1997, and nominated for an award from the International Association of Culinary Professionals.

== Bakepedia ==
In 2011, Wilson had an idea for a website, and "Bakepedia", a site for original recipes and information about baking, was launched in 2013. It was intended as a leading online resource for bakers.

== Books ==
Wilson is the author of several cookbooks, including A Baker's Field Guide to Christmas Cookies (2003), A Baker's Field Guide to Chocolate Chip Cookies (2004) and Wedding Cakes you Can Make (2005). She has also written books about Low-FODMAP diets, including The Low-FODMAP Diet Step by Step (2018, with Kate Scarlata).

== Personal life ==
Wilson grew up in New York City and moved to Amherst, Massachusetts in 1979. She has 3 children.
