= Teo Žagar =

Slovenian-American filmmaker and politician

Teo Erik Žagar (born 1978) is a Slovenian-American filmmaker and politician. He has served in the Vermont House of Representatives since 2011. Žagar was a member of the Democratic Party until deciding not to run for reelection in 2016. As a member of the House Agriculture Committee, one of his efforts has been the legalization of hemp in the state. He was a lead sponsor and floor reporter of a bill, passed by the House in 2013, to mandate the labeling of genetically modified foods.

Žagar moved to the United States in 1980, living in Washington D.C., with his single mother. In 1985 they settled in Barnard, Vermont, where he now resides. He attended the University of Vermont and went on to study filmmaking at Hampshire College in Massachusetts. He directed several films and served as an apprentice to Ken Burns, for whose film Horatio's Drive: America's First Road Trip (2003) he served as an editorial assistant. Despite his interest in filmmaking, he returned to Vermont in 2006 and began pursuing a career in public service. In the late 2000s he volunteered as a constable of Barnard. He worked in special education as a classroom manager. After the resignation of state Representative Mark Mitchell, Žagar met with several local Democratic committees to seek an appointment to Mitchell's seat. Vermont Governor Peter Shumlin was impressed with him and appointed him to the seat in August 2011.
