= Jane Marsching =

Jane D. Marsching
- Education: School of the Visual Arts 1995
- Known for: Environmental Art, Interdisciplinary Art, Emerging Fields, Digital Art
- Awards: Creative Capital; LEF Foundation; Artadia
- Website: www.janemarsching.com

Jane D. Marsching is an interdisciplinary digital artist focusing on issues of climate change and environmentalism. She earned a BA from Hampshire College and an MFA in photography from the School of the Visual Arts. She is Professor of Studio Foundation at MassArt. Her work has been exhibited nationally and internationally at major museums including the ICA Boston and MassMoca.

== Art ==
Marsching's climate change related work began using the National Oceanic Atmospheric Administration's North Pole webcam. She created a time-lapse film of footage from the webcam with sound by Victor McSurely. She created interactive works using data and relying heavily on research. Multiple works including the North Pole Webcam make up the interdisciplinary and collaborative project, Arctic Listening Post (2005-2009). The project was awarded a Creative Capital Grant in Emerging Fields in 2006. Her works have been influenced by the writing of Henry David Thoreau. Her projects extend for a number of years and include collaboration with scientists, choreographers, and software engineers. The resulting projects including, Field Station Concordia, are interactive, participatory and utilize networks, communities and the local landscape for their creation. She, Catherine D'Ignazio and Andi Sutton co-founded the Art&Activism group Platform 2. In 2020, Marsching conducted ink-foraging workshops at Fruitlands Museum in Harvard, Massachusetts.

== Awards ==
- Creative Capital
- LEF Foundation
- James and Audrey Foster Prize Finalist, ICA Boston, 2006
