= Concetta DiRusso =

Biochemistry researcher

Concetta DiRusso is an American scientist and Professor of Biochemistry. She is best known for her work on transcriptional regulation of fatty acid metabolism in bacteria.

== Education ==
DiRusso received her B.A. from Hampshire College, and in 1982 she completed her Ph.D. in cell and molecular biology from the University of Vermont. In 2015, she was invested with the George Holmes University Professorship in Biochemistry at the University of Nebraska–Lincoln.

== Career ==
DiRusso is a Fellow of the American Association for the Advancement of Science. In 2014, she served as Jefferson Science Fellow in the Global Health Bureau of the United States Agency for International Development.
