= G. Philip Robertson =

American biologist

G. Philip Robertson is an American biologist who is currently the University Distinguished Professor of Ecosystem Science at Michigan State University. He was elected a Fellow of the Ecological Society of America in 2024 and Member of the National Academy of Sciences in 2025.

== Early life and education ==
Received a bachelor of arts in biology from Hampshire College in 1976 and a doctorate in biology from Indiana University Bloomington in 1980.
