= Alba Arikha =

French-born writer

Alba Arikha (born 1966) is a French-born writer who lives in Paris.

== Early life ==
Brought up in Paris, her father was the Franco-Israeli artist Avigdor Arikha. Her mother is the American poet, Anne Atik. Her sister, Noga Arikha, is a historian. Arikha received her BA from Hampshire College, and her MFA from Columbia University.

== Career ==
Arikha has written six books. Her first two, Muse and Walking on Ice, were written under the name Alba Branca. Arikha's memoir Major/Minor was published in 2011 by Quartet Books. Charting her artistic childhood in Paris, coupled with memories of her godfather, Samuel Beckett, the book was shortlisted for the Spear's Awards and selected by The New Yorker among the best books of 2012. The paperback edition was published in 2017. An article about her family and Beckett was published in the TLS in October 2020.

She wrote a narrative poem, ‘Soon,’ published by CB Editions in 2013 and turned into an opera, one of two projects Arikha collaborated on as librettist with her husband, composer Tom Smail. It was performed in August 2013, at the Riverside Studios, in London. The second one, 'Blue Electric,' with music by Tom Smail, was based on Major/Minor was performed in August 2018 at the Tête-à-Tête Opera festival at RADA, and was directed by Hugh Hudson. The full production was performed at the Playground Theatre, London, in October 2020, directed by Orpha Phelan. Her novel, Where to find me, was published by Alma Books in 2018. It was selected among the best books of 2018 in the Evening Standard, and long listed for the 2020 Wingate Prize.

Her novel Two Hours was published by Eris Press in 2024. Charting a woman’s voyage through love, loss and eventually freedom in 1980’s New York, Paris, London and Rome, it was described by John Self in the Observer, as ‘concise, rigorous and heartbreaking,’ ‘a literary masterpiece of grace and weight,’ by Helen Cullen in The Irish Times, and ‘pellucid and precise, a wonderful wry lesson in forging a life without regret,’ in The Independent.

Her play, ‘Spanish Oranges,’ examining the power dynamics in a dysfunctional marriage, and starring Maryam d’Abo, Jay Villiers and Arianna Branca, was performed at the Playground Theatre in 2026. A critical success, it was described as ‘a searing study of a celebrity marriage,’ by Geordie Greig in the Independent, ‘a masterclass in language, brilliantly capturing the dynamics of a long marriage and the weight of the unsaid,’ by Lisa Hilton in the Critic Magazine, and 'sleek and refined' by City AM.

Arikha is a regular contributor to Radio 4, and was included in Pick of the Week. Since 2012, she has been teaching creative writing for various institutions such as the Royal Academy of Art and the Chocolate Factory and has been involved with Guardian masterclasses, since 2015, where she teaches classes on short fiction. In Spring 2017 she was Adjunct Assistant Professor at Columbia University, where she taught a masterclass in non-fiction. Her poem about the lockdown, ‘What I know,’ was published in Tortoise Media in 2020.

Alba is also a pianist and songwriter, and has performed in Paris and London. She has recorded two CDs of songs, Si j’ai aimé and Dans les rues de Paris. She has also written a song based on the main character of her novel, Where to find me.

In 2019, she was a visiting lecturer at the University of Hertfordshire, where she taught creative writing.

== Personal life ==
Arikha has two children from her previous marriage. She is married to the composer Tom Smail.

== Bibliography ==
Fiction:

- Muse (New ed.). London: Pan Books. 1999-03-12. ISBN 9780330352666.
- Walking on Ice. London: Pan Books. 2000-01-07. ISBN 9780330352673.
- Where to find me (2018)
- Two Hours. Eris. 2024.ISBN 978-1912475537

Non-Fiction:

- Major/Minor (2011)
- Soon (2013)

Operas:

- Soon (2013)
- Blue Electric (2018)

Music:

- Si j’ai aimé (2007)
- Dans les rues de Paris (2011)
- Where to find me (2018)
