= David Schimel =

- Born: 1955; United States
- Education: Hampshire College (BA); Colorado State University (PhD)
- Occupation: Research Scientist at the Jet Propulsion Lab
- Employer: NASA

David Schimel (born 1955) is a Research Scientist at NASA's Jet Propulsion Laboratory. He was formerly Chief Science Officer, Principal Investigator, and CEO for the National Ecological Observatory Network (NEON). Schimel was the convening lead author of the Intergovernmental Panel on Climate Change report, which led to the IPCC receiving the Nobel Peace Prize in 2007 alongside Al Gore. He has authored numerous papers on biogeochemistry and the global carbon cycle.

Schimel was the director at the Max Planck Institute for Biogeochemistry from 1995 to 2009.

He was one of the inaugural Fellows of the Ecological Society of America, elected in 2012.
