= Jerome Liebling =

American photographer

- Born: April 16, 1924; New York, New York
- Died: July 27, 2011 (aged 87); Northampton, Massachusetts
- Known for: Photography
- Website: jeromelieblingphotography.com

Jerome Liebling (April 16, 1924 Manhattan, New York – July 27, 2011 Northampton, Massachusetts) was an American photographer, filmmaker, and teacher. The documentary filmmaker Ken Burns, who studied with him at Hampshire College, called Liebling his mentor, and used one of Liebling's photographs on the cover of his 2022 book Our America: A Photographic History.

Liebling servedin the armed forces in Europe and North Africa during World War II. After the war, he returned to Brooklyn College under the GI Bill to study art and design under Walter Rosenblum and Ad Reinhardt. In 1947, he joined New York's famed Photo League where he studied with Paul Strand. For two years he taught classes, showed his work in group exhibitions and served as membership secretary on the League's executive committee. In 1948, he studied motion-picture production at New School for Social Research and worked as a documentary filmmaker.

While a professor of film and photography at the University of Minnesota, Liebling began a longtime collaborative relationship with filmmaker Allen Downs; together they produced several award-winning documentaries, including Pow Wow, The Tree Is Dead, and The Old Men.

Liebling received numerous awards and grants, including two Guggenheim Fellowships, a National Endowment for the Arts Photographic Survey Grant, and a fellowship from the Massachusetts Council on the Arts. His photographs are in the permanent collections of many museums, including the Art Institute of Chicago, Museum of Modern Art in New York, the National Gallery of Art, the Smithsonian American Art Museum, The Jewish Museum in New York, the San Francisco Museum of Modern Art, and the National Gallery of Canada in Ottawa.

Liebling was a professor emeritus of Hampshire College. He was the younger brother of David Liebling and Stan Liebling, and he is the father of five children, including Minnesota politician Tina Liebling and film director/producer Rachel Liebling.

In 2015 the Steven Kasher Gallery held a retrospective of Liebling consisting of 50 photographs taken over 50 years in New York City.
