= Hampshire College Summer Studies in Mathematics =

American residential program for talented high school students

The Hampshire College Summer Studies in Mathematics (HCSSiM) is an American residential program for mathematically talented high-school students. The program has been conducted each summer since 1971, with the exceptions of 1981 and 1996, and has approximately 2,000 alumni. David Kelly (1940–2025), a professor of mathematics at Hampshire College in Amherst, Massachusetts, created the program and directed it until his death. After the upcoming closure of Hampshire College, scheduled for December 2026, the summer program is expected to continue at a different campus in 2027.

== Background ==
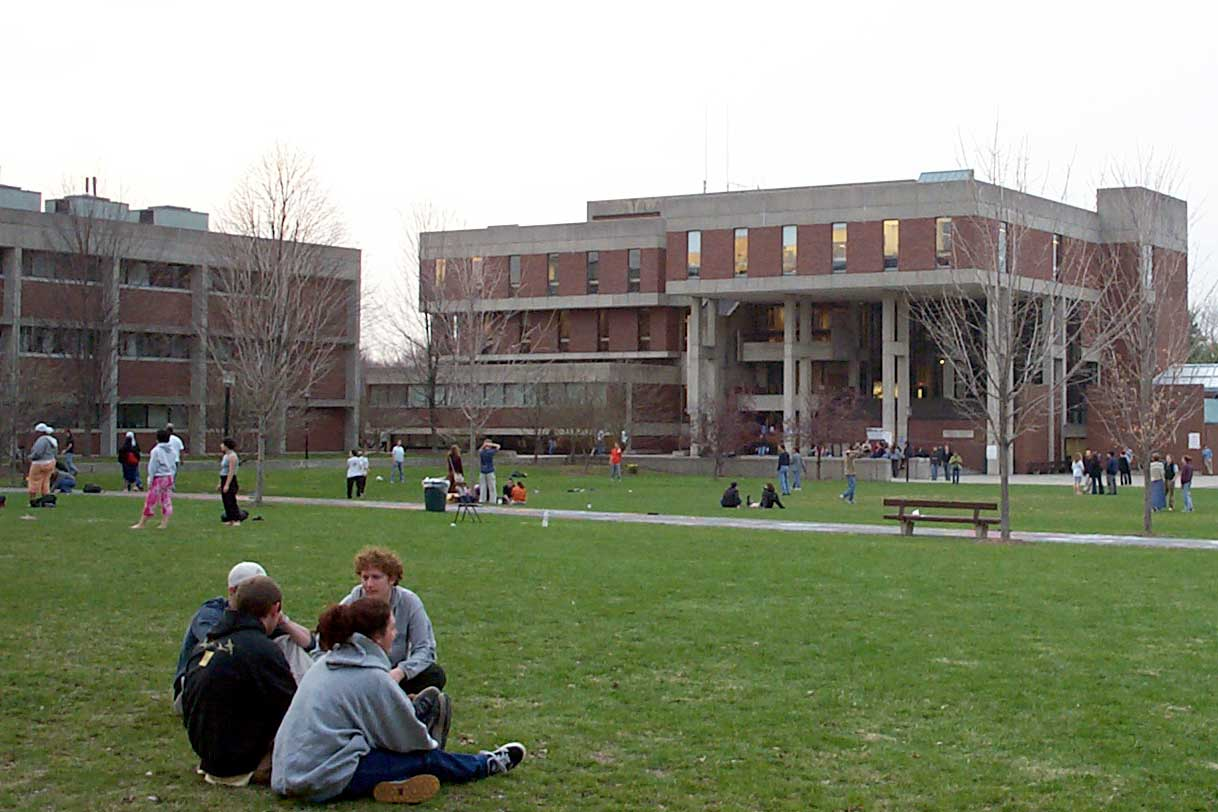
Hampshire College campus (2001)

The HCSSiM program, which was housed at Hampshire College for more than a half-century, generally runs for six weeks from early July until mid-August, for approximately 50 students. The program itself consists of lectures, study sessions, math workshops (general-knowledge classes), "maxi" courses (specialized three-week classes run by the senior staff members), and "mini" courses (specialized shorter classes), all emphasizing collaborative mathematical exploration and discovery.

On a typical day, students spend four hours in morning classes, have lunch together with the faculty, and then have several hours to use at their leisure. During this "down time", students and faculty members often host "quasi" lessons, where they participate in small-group activities such as juggling or making sushi. They return for the "Prime Time Theorem" (an hour-long talk on an interesting piece of mathematics given by a faculty member or a visitor), have dinner, and then spend three hours in a problem-solving session. One instructor blogged the content of her workshop classes including topics in combinatorics, fractals, number theory, group theory, and computer-assisted research, demonstrating how the summer program extends far beyond a typical high-school curriculum. An occasional research publication has resulted directly from work done at HCSSiM. A feature-length documentary Hunting Yellow Pigs (2026) details the program and includes interviews with dozens of prominent alumni. Mathematics Magazine has also commended the program.

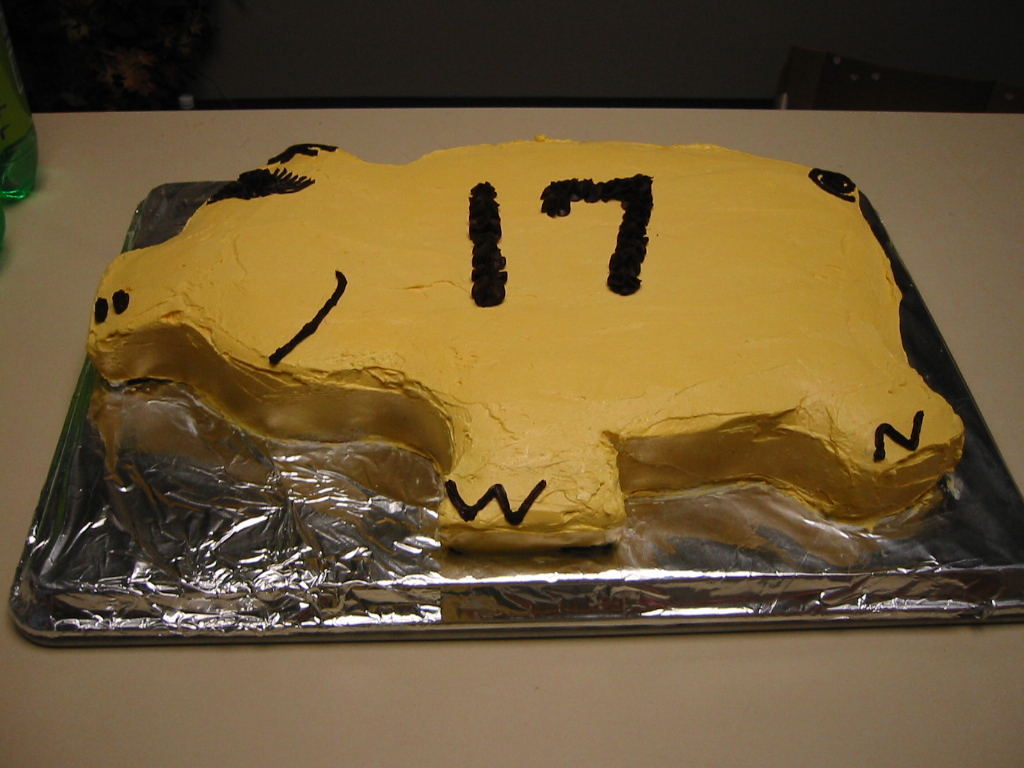
Yellow Pigs Day cake (2004)

Each year on July 17, many alumni visit for "Yellow Pigs Day", celebrating the number 17 and the colorful mascot that Kelly established as emblems of the program. This observance was expanded to multi-day events for 2006, 2017 and 2023, years divisible by or ending in 17.

The Summer Studies program has been funded in the past by the American Mathematical Society and the U.S. National Science Foundation, and in recent years increasingly by private donations supplementing student tuition.

Due to the coronavirus pandemic, the 2020 Summer Studies ran online for a shortened program of four weeks.

Despite the upcoming closure of Hampshire College, the 2026 Summer Studies program was held at Hampshire's campus, and the program is expected to continue at a different campus in 2027.

== Notable alumni ==
Alumni of HCSSiM include many mathematicians and others in related (and not-so-related) fields.

- Gabriel Aeppli, professor of physics at ETH Zurich, co-founder of the London Centre for Nanotechnology, Fellow of the Royal Society
- Julie Ahringer, professor of genetics at the University of Cambridge, Fellow of the Royal Society
- Douglas N. Arnold, professor of mathematics at the University of Minnesota
- Jeremy Avigad, professor of philosophy and mathematics at Carnegie Mellon University
- J. Stewart Burns, television writer and producer known for his work on The Simpsons
- Bram Cohen, developer of BitTorrent, co-founder of CodeCon
- Matthew Cook, computer scientist, group leader at the Institute for Neuroinformatics at ETH Zurich
- Lenore Cowen, computer scientist and mathematician at Tufts University
- Marie desJardins, computer scientist, former dean at Simmons University, formerly at SRI International
- Alan Edelman, professor of mathematics at the Massachusetts Institute of Technology, Sloan Fellow
- Aaron M. Ellison, retired Harvard ecologist
- Glenn Ellison, professor of economics at MIT
- Judy Goldsmith, professor of computer science at the University of Kentucky
- Alan Grayson, former member of the U.S House of Representatives for Florida's 8th and 9th Congressional Districts
- Marcia Groszek, professor of mathematics at Dartmouth College
- Neil Immerman, professor of computer science at the University of Massachusetts Amherst, Guggenheim Fellow
- Adam Tauman Kalai, game theorist and computer scientist formerly at OpenAI
- Susan Landau, professor in cybersecurity and policy at Tufts University, Guggenheim Fellow
- Eric Lander, professor of biology at MIT, presidential science advisor, MacArthur Fellow, Rhodes Scholar
- Adam Leibovich, theoretical physicist and dean at University of Pittsburgh
- Russell Lyons, professor of mathematics at Indiana University Bloomington
- Adam Marcus, professor of mathematics at Princeton University
- Barry Nalebuff, professor of management at Yale University, co-founder of Honest Tea
- David Notkin, former professor of computer science and engineering at University of Washington
- Cathy O'Neil, data scientist, author, and blogger at Mathbabe
- Eve Ostriker, professor of astrophysics at Princeton
- Michael Pepper, physicist notable for his work in semiconductor nanostructures, Fellow of the Royal Society
- Bjorn Poonen, professor of mathematics at MIT, Putnam Competition winner
- Jim Propp, professor of mathematics at the University of Massachusetts Lowell
- Dana Randall, professor of computer science at Georgia Tech, sister of Lisa
- Lisa Randall, professor of theoretical physics at Harvard University, author, Fellow of the Institute of Physics
- Jessica Riskin, professor of history of science at Stanford University
- Robert Schapire, computer scientist at Microsoft Research, former professor of computer science at Princeton
- Ed Scheinerman, professor of applied mathematics and statistics at Johns Hopkins University
- Seth Schoen, technologist at the Electronic Frontier Foundation, author of the DeCSS haiku
- John Schulman, artificial intelligence researcher, co-founder of OpenAI
- Noam Shazeer, computer scientist at OpenAI, who co-led Google Gemini and founded character.ai
- Lisa Su, chair and CEO of AMD
- John Sullivan, professor of mathematics at Technische Universität Berlin
- Jennifer Taback, professor of mathematics at Bowdoin College
- Ann Trenk, professor of mathematics at Wellesley College
- Eugene Volokh, legal scholar at the Hoover Institution, professor emeritus of UCLA School of Law, author of The Volokh Conspiracy
- Martin M. Wattenberg, professor of computer science at Harvard University, known for work in data visualization at Google and IBM Research
- Victor Wickerhauser, professor of mathematics at Washington University in St. Louis
- Elizabeth Wilmer, professor of mathematics at Oberlin College
- Erik Winfree, professor of computer science and bioengineering at the California Institute of Technology, MacArthur Fellow
- David Zuckerman, professor of computer science at University of Texas at Austin
