= Alice H. Lichtenstein =

American nutrition scientist

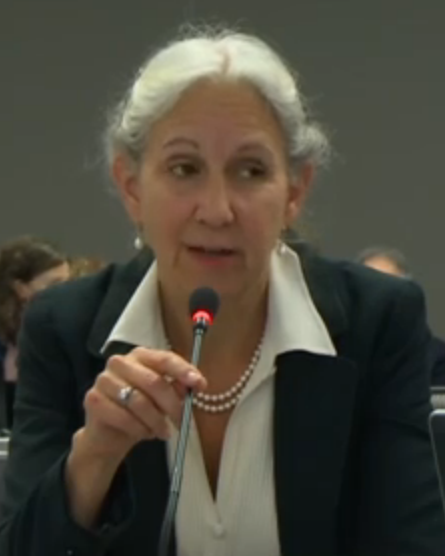
- Lichtenstein in 2015
- Education: Cornell University; Pennsylvania State University; Harvard University
- Known for: Research in diet and heart disease
- Scientific career
- Fields: Nutrition science
- Workplaces: Tufts University
- Doctoral advisor: D. Mark Hegsted

Alice Hinda Lichtenstein is an American professor, researcher, and the lead author of the American Heart Association's dietary guidance for cardiovascular disease risk reduction. She is an expert on cardiovascular health, and has been recognized for her research on dietary fat. Designated a distinguished university professor, she is the chronic disease leader at a USDA center on aging and holds the Stanley N. Gershoff chair in nutrition science and policy at the Friedman School of Nutrition, Tufts University in downtown Boston.

Lichtenstein has served on the Food and Nutrition Board, multiple committees of the National Academy of Sciences, and the U.S. Dietary Guidelines Advisory Committee.

== Education ==
Lichtenstein earned a B.S. in nutrition from Cornell University, M.S. in Nutrition from the Pennsylvania State University, and M.S. and D.Sc. in nutritional biochemistry from Harvard University. She completed her post-doctoral training at the Cardiovascular Institute, Boston University School of Medicine.

== Career ==
External videos
- How does fat affect us?, Tufts University, 2020.
- 2026 Dietary Guidance to Improve Cardiovascular Health, AHAScience, 2026.

=== Tufts University ===
Lichtenstein is the Stanley N. Gershoff Professor of Nutrition Science and Policy at the Friedman School of Nutrition Science and Policy of Tufts University. She is senior scientist and leader of Diet & Chronic Disease Prevention at the Healthy Aging Directive of the Jean Mayer USDA Human Nutrition Research Center on Aging, and professor of medicine at Tufts University School of Medicine. In 2024, she was awarded the designation of Tufts University Distinguished Professor. She is editor-in-chief of the Tufts Health and Nutrition Letter and associate editor of the Journal of Lipid Research.

=== American Heart Association statements ===
Lichtenstein was chair of the writing group and lead author of the 2021 and 2026 American Heart Association's statements on "Dietary guidance to improve cardiovascular health". She served on the task forces on practice guidelines for the 2013 American Heart Association/American College of Cardiology's Guideline on the Treatment Of Blood Cholesterol to Reduce Atherosclerotic Cardiovascular Risk in Adults and Guideline on Lifestyle Management to Reduce Cardiovascular Risk.

=== Other nutrition guidelines committees ===
Lichtenstein served on the Food and Nutrition Board (FNB) of the National Academy of Sciences (NAS). She was vice chair of the NAS Committee on Examination of Front-of-Package Nutrition Rating Systems and Symbols. On the NAS Panel on Macronutrients she helped choose the values used on the nutrition facts label for packaged foods and beverages.

She served on multiple NAS committees, most recently as a member of the Standing Committee for the Review of the Dietary Reference Intakes Framework.

Lichtenstein was vice-chair of the 2015 Dietary Guidelines Advisory Committee (DGAC) of the U.S. Department of Agriculture and the U.S. Department of Health and Human Services. She also served on the 2000 Dietary Guidelines Advisory Committee. This committee develops a scientific report that informs the Dietary Guidelines for Americans.

== Research ==
Lichtenstein has spent her research career studying the relationship of diet and heart disease. She is known for her research on the effects of partially hydrogenated fat on blood lipids and cardiovascular disease. Her work led to labeling and eventual banning of trans fat by the U.S. Food and Drug Administration. In her capacity as director of the cardiovascular nutrition laboratory, Lichtenstein oversees research projects on a wide range of nutrition- and cardiovascular disease-related topics such as soy protein and isoflavones; sterol and stanol esters; dietary fats and oils; dietary patterns, and nutrition policy.

== Publications ==
Lichtenstein is the author of more than four hundred peer-reviewed articles and over twenty book chapters.

Lichtenstein is a frequent contributor to the media, where she discusses nutritional information and misinformation. She has contributed to several high-profile stories in outlets including The New York Times, NPR, The Washington Post, and PBS Newshour.

For example, she provided a cautionary note to The New York Times when a 2014 meta-analysis found that saturated fat was not implicated in heart disease. She told Anahad O'Connor that it would be unfortunate if the study resulted in people eating too much butter and cheese. NPR reported that she wrote a letter to the editor at The New York Times correcting Mark Bittman when he announced that "Butter Is Back" and that she cited a 2013 review by the American Heart Association that recommends limiting saturated fat.

In 2005 she co-authored Strong Women, Strong Hearts with Miriam E. Nelson and Lawrence Lindner. In 2006, Shape magazine named Lichtenstein one of ten "Women Who Shaped the World". In 2019, Tamar Haspel called her a "grande dame of nutrition."

== Personal life ==
Lichtenstein married fellow Tufts professor Barry Goldin who died in June 2026.

== Awards and honors ==
In 2018 Lichtenstein received the Alumni Award of Merit from Harvard T.H. Chan School of Public Health, and the Supelco Research Award from the American Oil Chemists Society, the first woman to receive the award since its inception in 1968. In 2024, the American Heart Association gave her its highest honor, its Award of Meritorious Achievement. She received an Honorary Lifetime Membership Award in Recognition of Extraordinary Expertise and Contributions to Clinical Lipidology from the National Lipid Association, and has been elected as a Fellow of the American Society for Nutrition. In 2019 she accepted the Conrad A. Elvehjem Award for Public Service in Nutrition from the American Society for Nutrition. She has numerous other awards dating back to the 1970s, including an honorary Ph.D. in 2005 from the University of Eastern Finland.
