= New College Plan =

The New College Plan resulted in the formation of Hampshire College.

In 1958, the presidents of Amherst College, Smith College, Mount Holyoke College, and the University of Massachusetts Amherst (together with Hampshire they are known as the Five Colleges consortium), all located in the Pioneer Valley of Massachusetts, formed the Committee for an Experimental College/Committee for New College to explore the creation of an experimental college to put into practice new ideas in academic organization and curriculum.

The intent of these new ideas was to enable students to educate themselves, develop independence, and take responsibility for their own education. Suggested curricular innovations included the freshman seminar, a midwinter (January) term, academic departments replaced by broad groupings of faculty (Social Sciences, Humanities, Sciences), cooperation with the sponsoring institutions, and individualized programs of concentration replacing defined majors. It also placed emphasis on multidisciplinary learning and close faculty interaction. Making this all possible was the idea of providing a liberal arts college education at the minimum cost per student, allowing the school to survive on tuition alone.

The Committee for New College issued two further reports, Student Reactions to Study Facilities (1960) and More Power to Them (1962). Student Reactions to Study Facilities: with implications for architects and college administrators (1960) reported on an extensive survey of college students in the area colleges, indicating their preferences for small or individual study spaces whether in libraries or dormitory rooms.

More Power to Them: a report of faculty and student experience in the encouragement of student initiative (1962), describes a series of twelve experimental courses conducted by faculty during the 1959–60 academic year. These courses attempted to promote student independence through implementing two of the ideas detailed in the New College Plan: the freshman seminar, and the student-led seminar for more advanced students. Eight of the courses were judged successes; one a failure; and the rest had mixed results. One important finding was that more of the instructor's time was needed for supervising such independent work (in comparison to standard lecture courses), rather than less.

The committee's resulting work, in conjunction with a focused vision of Hampshire College published in 1965 by Franklin Patterson and Charles R. Longsworth in The Making of a College, along with the donation of $6,000,000 by Amherst alumnus Harold Johnson, implemented the New College Plan in the formation of Hampshire College in South Amherst, Massachusetts. The New College Plan was widely disseminated and studied and influenced the development of other colleges' programs such as the Midwinter or January Term. Other institutions influenced by the New College Plan include the New College of Florida.

The original 1958 New College Plan offered to: "...dethrone the course as the unit of knowledge...[and] dethrones the idea that a college must be an intellectual autarchy: the course offering is to be developed so as to take advantage for collateral purposes of resources available at neighboring institutions.[...]The New College Plan is based on the conviction that the average student entering one of the better colleges is capable of far more independence than he now demonstrates, but that he must be given proper training and proper opportunities."
