= Gregory S. Prince Jr. =

4th President of Hampshire College
- In office 1989–2005
- Preceded by: Adele S. Simmons
- Succeeded by: Ralph J. Hexter

Personal details
- Education: Yale University (BA, MA, PhD)

Academic work
- Discipline: History
- Institutions: Dartmouth College

Gregory Smith Prince Jr. (born 1939) became Hampshire College's fourth president in 1989 and retired in 2005.

In his 15 years at the helm of Hampshire, Prince worked to broaden the public's awareness of the value and role of liberal arts education, reinforcing the understanding that the liberal arts are about developing an attitude of mind, not simply conveying a body of knowledge.

Prince built partnerships with organizations outside of education and with K-12 education, stressing the importance of strong relationships between higher education institutions and their surrounding communities and the responsibility of higher education to society as a whole.

As president, he envisioned a "Cultural Village," a cluster of independent organizations with complementary missions located around the campus. The Eric Carle Museum of Picture Book Art, a center for international picture book art, drew 90,000 visitors to the Hampshire campus and Amherst during its first year. The National Yiddish Book Center, shares the treasures of rescued Yiddish Books, representing a thousand years of Jewish history and culture. Lastly, New England Wetlands, Inc., grows 118 species of plants for use in restoration of wetlands throughout the region.

Prince has served as president of Five Colleges, Inc. and as chairman of the board of the Association of Independent Colleges and Universities in Massachusetts (AICUM). He is chairman of The Washington Campus, vice-chair of the Council on Racial and Ethnic Justice of the American Bar Association and serves on the board of directors of the New England Association of Schools and Colleges (NEASC), the Massachusetts Nature Conservancy and the Joyful Child Foundation. Prince is also the 2004 recipient of the Millicent Kauffman Award from the Amherst Area Chamber of Commerce, the town's equivalent of the citizen of the year. Prince is currently a member of the Board of Trustees of the American University in Bulgaria and a member of the Governing Board of the European Humanities University. In 2008 he authored a book, Teach Them to Challenge Authority, in which he argues that "educational institutions should model the behaviour and values they seek to instil in their students and how this is essential to teaching students how to challenge authority and convention in appropriate, creative and constructive ways."

Before joining Hampshire, he was associate dean of the faculty for curriculum planning and resource development at Dartmouth College and a professor of history.
