= Ralph Hexter =

Professor of classics and comparative literature

Ralph J. Hexter
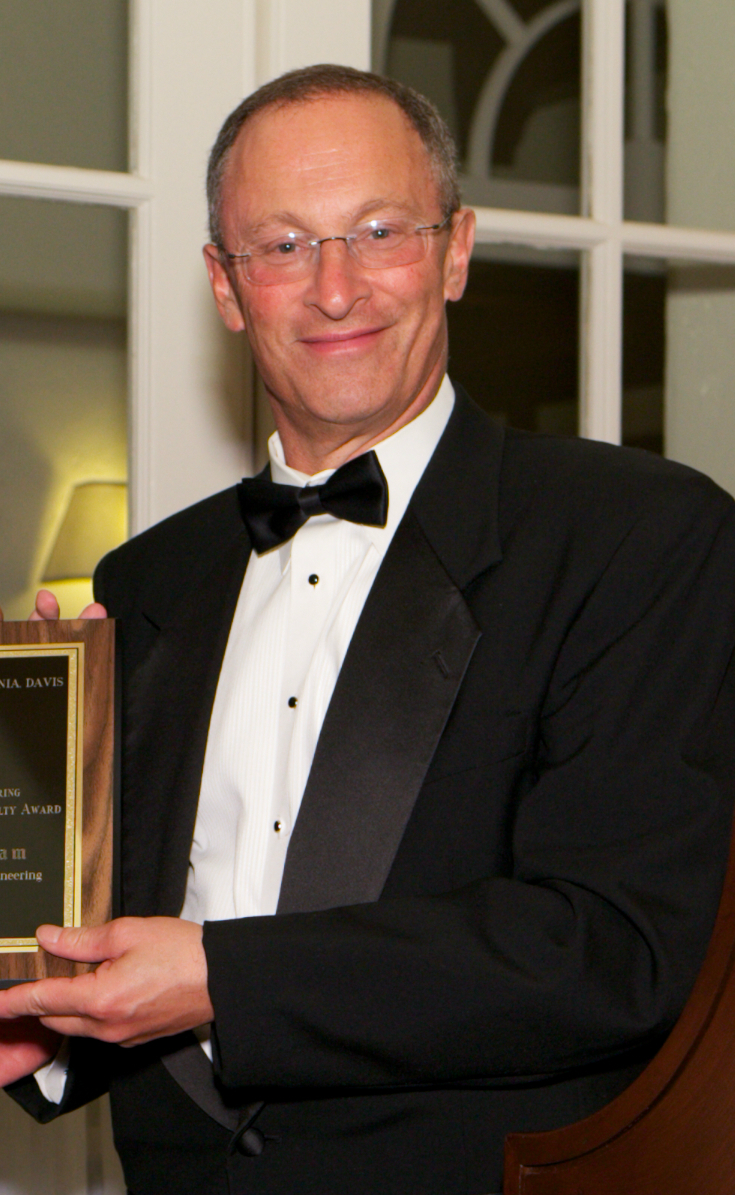
- Hexter at the Gala Event in 2012 celebrating 50 years of achievement at the UC Davis College of Engineering

Acting / Interim Chancellor University of California, Davis
- In office April 28, 2016 – July 31, 2017
- Preceded by: Linda Katehi
- Succeeded by: Gary S. May

5th President of Hampshire College
- In office 2005–2010
- Preceded by: Gregory S. Prince, Jr.
- Succeeded by: Jonathan Lash; Marlene Gerber Fried (interim)

Personal details
- Born: August 25, 1952 (age 74)
- Spouse: Manfred Kollmeier (after 2007)
- Education: Harvard University (BA); Corpus Christi College, Oxford (MA); Yale University (MPhil, PhD)
- Scientific career
- Fields: Classical studies Classical literature
- Thesis: Medieval school commentaries on ovid's "ars amatoria," "epistulae ex ponto," and "epistulae heroidum" (1982)

Ralph Jay Hexter (born 1952) is a distinguished professor emeritus of classics and comparative literature at the University of California, Davis. as well as professor emeritus of classics and comparative literature at UC Berkeley. Previously, he served as the fifth president of Hampshire College.

Effective September 1, 2026, Hexter was recalled from retirement to serve as Interim Provost and Executive Vice President for Academic Affairs at the University of California. He will serve until a permanent provost is in place.

== Education ==
Hexter received an A.B. in English literature magna cum laude from Harvard College in 1974. He was elected to Phi Betta Kappa in the fall of 1972 and in his senior year won both the Le Baron Russell Briggs Honors Thesis Prize and the First Bowdoin Prize (English Essay). He received a Knox Fellowship for study in Great Britain. He earned a B.A. and M.A. in classics and modern languages at Corpus Christi College, Oxford in 1977 and 1982, respectively. He also earned an M.Phil. and a Ph.D. in comparative literature from Yale University in 1979 and 1982, respectively. From 1979 to 1981, recipient of a fellowship from the DAAD, he was enrolled in the Ludwig-Maximilians-Universität in Munich, Germany.

== Career ==
Hexter was an assistant and then associate professor of classics at Yale from 1981 to 1991. From 1991 to 1995 Hexter was professor of classics and comparative literature at the University of Colorado at Boulder, where he also directed the graduate program in comparative literature. Moving to the University of California, Berkeley in January, 1996, from March, 1996 he chaired the department of comparative literature. From September, 1996 to August, 1998, he chaired the editorial board of the journal Classical Antiquity. Effective July 1, 1998 he was Dean of Arts and Humanities and (from July 1, 2002) concurrently Executive Dean of the College of Letters and Science.

Hexter served as President of Hampshire College from August 1, 2005 through December 31, 2010. Until its closure in 2026, Hampshire College, located in Amherst, Massachusetts, was the youngest member of the Five College Consortium.

Returning to California, Hexter served as provost and executive vice chancellor of the University of California, Davis, effective January 1, 2001. During this time, Hexter served first as acting chancellor (April 28 to September 14, 2016) and then interim chancellor (September 15, 2016 to July 31, 2017).

On July 1, 2020, he stepped down from his position as provost and returned to his position as a distinguished professor of classics and comparative literature, from which he retired on June 30, 2025.

Hexter was elected to the American Academy of Arts and Sciences in 2016.

Hexter has been involved with the Association of Independent Colleges and Universities in Massachusetts, Phi Beta Kappa, the Society for Classical Studies (formerly the American Philological Association), and the National Conference for Community and Justice. Since 2023 Hexter has been a commissioner of the Accrediting Commission for Community and Junior Colleges (ACCJC) and serves as a trustee on the board of Cal Performances.

== Personal life ==
Hexter has been out as a gay man since his undergraduate years. He was among the founding members of LGBTQ Presidents (now Leaders) in Higher Education. Hexter met his longtime partner, Manfred Kollmeier, in Munich in December, 1979. They married in Massachusetts in 2007. Kollmeier passed away in 2024 at the age of 77, survived by their son Stefan, his wife Bettina, and grandson Louis. In his husband's memory, Hexter endowed the Global Aggies Award for LGBTQIA+ Rights that they had established at UC Davis.

== Bibliography ==
- Equivocal Oaths and Ordeals in Medieval Literature, by Ralph J. Hexter, Cambridge, Mass.: Harvard University Press, 1975.
- Poetic Reclamation and Goethe's Venetian Epigrams, Modern Language Notes 96 (1981) 526-555.
- Ovid and Medieval Schooling: Studies in Medieval School Commentaries on Ovid's Ars Amatoria, Epistulae ex Ponto, and Epistulae Heroidum, by Ralph J. Hexter, Munich: Arbeo-Gesellschaft, 1986.
- “What Was the Trojan Horse Made Of?: Interpreting Virgil's Aeneid," Yale Journal of Criticism 3.2 (Spring, 1990), 109-31.
- Innovations of Antiquity, edited by Ralph Hexter and Daniel Selden, New York: Routledge, 1992.
- A Guide to the Odyssey: A Commentary on the English Translation of Robert Fitzgerald, by Ralph J. Hexter, New York: Vintage Books, 1993.
- The Faith of Achates: Finding Aeneas' Other, by Ralph J. Hexter, Berkeley, CA: Doe Library, University of California, 1997.
- "Masked Balls," Cambridge Opera Journal 14 (2002) 93-108. Reprinted in Steven Huebner, ed., National Traditions in Nineteenth-Century Opera, vol. I: Italy, France, England and the Americas, The Ashgate Library of Essays in Opera Studies, Ashgate, 2010.
- "John Boswell's Gay Science: Prolegomenon to a Re-Reading," in Matthew Kuefler, ed., History, Homosexuality, and John Boswell: Essays to Honor the Twenty-Fifth Anniversary of the Publication of Christianity, Social Tolerance and Homosexuality, Chicago: University of Chicago Press, 2005, pp. 35-56.
- "Ovid in Translation in Medieval Europe (Ovid-Übersetzungen im europäischen Mittelalter)," in Harald Kittel et al., eds., Übersetzung-Translation-Traduction, vol. 2, Berlin and New York: Walter de Gruyter, 2008, pp.1311-1328.
- The Oxford Handbook of Medieval Latin Literature, edited by Ralph J. Hexter and David Townsend. New York: Oxford University Press, 2012.
- "On First Looking into Vergil's Homer," in Joseph Farrell and Michael Putnam, eds., A Companion to Vergil’s Aeneid and its Tradition, Oxford: Blackwell, 2010, pp. 26-36.
- "The Kisses of Juventius and Policing the Boundaries of Masculinity: The Case of Catullus," in Jennifer Ingleheart, ed., Ancient Rome & the Construction of Modern Homosexual Identities, New York: Oxford University Press, 2015, pp. 273-87.
- Reading the Past Across Space and Time: Receptions and World Literature, ed. with Brenda Deen Schildgen. London: Palgrave Macmillan, 2017.
- Appendix Ovidiana: Latin Texts Ascribed to Ovid in the Middle Ages, edited by Ralph Hexter, Larua Pfuntner, and Justin Haynes. Dumbarton Oaks Medieval Library 62. Cambridge, Mass: Harvard University Press, 2020.
- Entertaining Ambiguities: Sexuality, Humanism and Ephemeral Performances in Fifteenth-Century Italy. Philadelphia: University of Pennsylvania Press, 2025.
