= Franklin Patterson =

American academic (1916–1994)

1st President of Hampshire College
- In office 1966–1971
- Succeeded by: Charles R. Longsworth

Personal details
- Born: September 14, 1916 Ellsworth, Iowa
- Died: July 13, 1994 (aged 77) Framingham, Massachusetts
- Education: Occidental College (B.A., 1939); University of California, Los Angeles (M.A., 1941); Claremont Graduate University (Ph.D., 1955)
- Occupation: Professor, author
- Known for: First President of Hampshire College

Franklin Kessel Patterson (September 14, 1916 – July 13, 1994) was a professor and author, and the first president of Hampshire College in Amherst, Massachusetts. He was also, along with the other presidents of the Five Colleges, a co-author of the New College Plan.

== Early life ==
Patterson was born on September 14, 1916, in Ellsworth, Iowa. He received his bachelor's degree from Occidental College, his master's degree from the University of California at Los Angeles, and his doctorate from the Claremont Graduate School.

Patterson served in the U.S. Army Air Force from 1942 to 1946, where he reached the rank of captain.

== Career ==
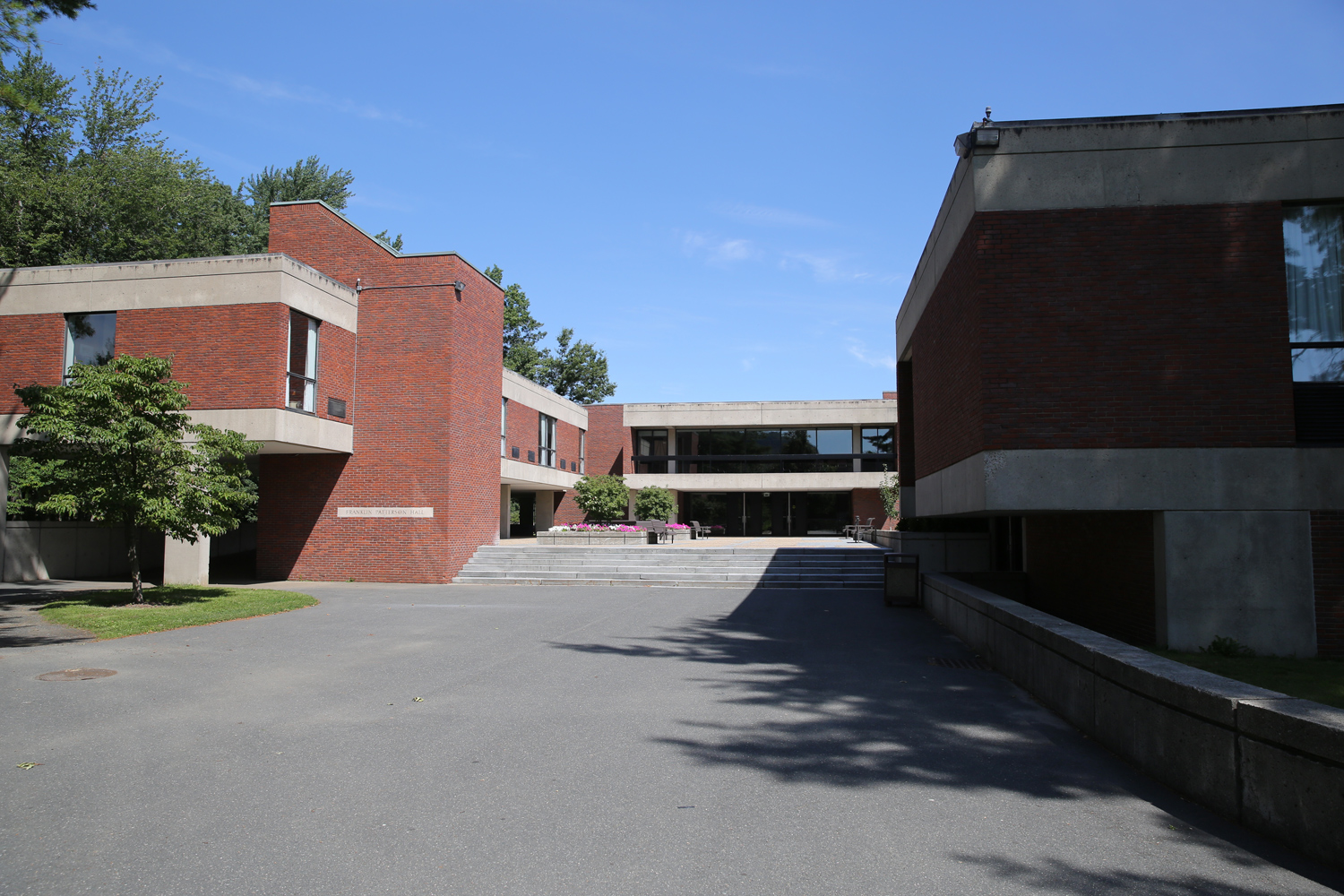
Outside view of Franklin Patterson Hall at Hampshire College.

Patterson began his teaching career as professor at Tufts University from 1957 to 1966, and with Charles Longsworth, helped write The New College Plan in The Making of the College.

In 1966, Patterson was appointed president of Hampshire college by the founding board of trustees in 1965, initially supervising construction, and fund-raising, in preparation for the college's opening in 1970. During the first few years, Patterson chose the Deans and senior administrative staff of the college, organized the academic plans, and assisted in faculty hiring. When the college opened in 1970, Patterson continued as president for the first academic year.

In 1971, Patterson resigned as president to accept the position of chairman of the college's board of trustees, founded as a "center for educational innovation" with four other colleges in central Massachusetts: Smith College, the University of Massachusetts Amherst, Amherst College, and Mount Holyoke College. The Trustees named the college's first academic building "Franklin Patterson Hall" in his honor.

From 1971, through the early 1980s, Patterson was a professor at the University of Massachusetts Amherst in political science and government, and served as secretary of the university board, as well as interim president from 1977 through 1978.

== Personal life ==
Patterson married Jessamy Longacre in 1937, and had two children: a daughter, Shelley Katherine, and a son, Eric. Patterson and Jessamy later divorced. He later married Emily Goldblatt in 1972, with whom he had a son, Nicholas, but that marriage also ended in divorce. His last partner was Harriet Wittenborg. Patterson died on July 13, 1994, of natural causes at his home in Framingham, Massachusetts, at the age of 77.
