= Charles Longsworth =

American businessman (1929–2025)

Charles R. Longsworth

2nd President of Hampshire College
- In office 1971–1977
- Preceded by: Franklin Patterson
- Succeeded by: Adele S. Simmons

Personal details
- Born: August 21, 1929
- Died: January 8, 2025 (aged 95) Concord, Massachusetts, U.S.
- Education: Amherst College

Charles R. Longsworth (August 21, 1929 – January 8, 2025) was the director of Saul Centers, Inc. He assumed this position in June 1993. He served as president Emeritus of Hampshire College. He worked as president of The Colonial Williamsburg Foundation from 1977 to 1994, as Chief Executive Officer until November 1992, and Chairman from November 1991 to November 1994. He worked as Chairman Emeritus of The Colonial Williamsburg Foundation of Williamsburg, Virginia. He graduated from Amherst College in 1951 and served as Life Trustee at the college. Longsworth was Hampshire College's founding vice president who succeeded Franklin Patterson as President (1971–1977), and who had helped draft the final 1965 plan in the form of The Making of College from the New College Plan. He was a member of the American Philosophical Society.
