= D. Mark Hegsted =

American nutritionist

- Born: David Mark Hegsted; March 25, 1914; Rexburg, Idaho, U.S.
- Died: June 16, 2009 (aged 95); Westwood, Massachusetts, U.S.
- Education: University of Idaho (BS); University of Wisconsin (PhD)
- Known for: Hegsted equation
- Scientific career
- Workplaces: Harvard University
- Notable students: Alice H. Lichtenstein

David Mark Hegsted (March 25, 1914 – June 16, 2009) was an American nutritionist who studied the connections between food consumption and heart disease. His work included studies that showed that consumption of saturated fats led to increases in cholesterol, leading to the development of dietary guidelines intended to help Americans achieve better health through improved food choices.

== Early life and education ==
Hegsted was born on March 25, 1914, in Rexburg, Idaho. He graduated in 1936 from the University of Idaho and was awarded a Doctor of Philosophy in biochemistry in 1940 from the University of Wisconsin.

== Career ==
He came to the Department of Nutrition at the Harvard School of Public Health in 1942 after spending a year at Abbott Laboratories as a research chemist. He was named as a professor of nutrition in 1962 and remained at Harvard until 1978.

=== Hegsted equation ===
Research performed by Hegsted in the early 1960s studied the relationships between changes in diet and serum levels of cholesterol. The equation he developed showed that dietary cholesterol and saturated fats from sources such as eggs and meat in the diet raised harmful cholesterol levels, monounsaturated fats had little effect and polyunsaturated fats from sources such as nuts and seeds lowered levels. Results from these studies were published in 1965 in the American Journal of Clinical Nutrition, to what was described by The New York Times as "great acclaim". In combination with research performed independently by Ancel Keys, these results led to recommendations advocating decreased dietary consumption of saturated fats.

The Hegsted equation is a method used to predict the effects of diet on total serum cholesterol:

$\Delta \text{Cholesterol} \; (\text{mg/dl}) = 2.16\Delta \text{S} - 1.65\Delta\text{P} + 0.068\Delta \text{C}_{\text{mg/day}}$

Where $\text{S}$ = saturated fatty acids (% of total calories), $\text{P}$ = polyunsaturated fatty acids (% of total calories), and $\text{C}$ = dietary cholesterol.

=== Later career ===
In 1978, he was hired by the United States Department of Agriculture as Administrator of the Food and Nutrition Service, serving until 1982. He was hired by Harvard Medical School in 1982 as Associate Director for Research at the New England Regional Primate Research Center.

After his death, researchers uncovered connections to research funded by the sugar industry in which Hegsted was critical of connections between sugar consumption and heart disease. The significance of this work in shaping future nutrition policy is disputed, and the Dietary Goals for the United States asks Americans to, "Reduce the consumption of refined and other processed sugars by about 45 percent to account for about 10 percent of total energy intake".

Hegsted's efforts to encourage the United States Department of Agriculture to inform the public about changes in diet included his involvement in drafting Dietary Goals for the United States, a 1977 report from the United States Senate Select Committee on Nutrition and Human Needs that suggested that increased consumption of fruits, grains and vegetables could help cut the risk of heart attacks and other diseases. It was the predecessor of the Dietary Guidelines for Americans updated twice each decade by the federal government.

Hegsted was elected as a member of the United States National Academy of Sciences. The author of over 400 published papers and other works, he served as editor of Nutrition Reviews from 1968 until 1978. He served on bodies advising the National Institutes of Health and the National Research Council in the United States, and internationally to the Food and Agriculture Organization and the World Health Organization.

== Death ==
A resident of Westwood, Massachusetts, Hegsted died there at age 95 on June 16, 2009. Hegsted and his wife, Maxine Scow Hegsted, had two children, Christina Hegsted and Eric Hegsted.
