= Anahad O'Connor =

American journalist (born 1981)

- Born: May 23, 1981 (age 45); New York City, U.S.
- Education: Yale University
- Occupations: Journalist; staff reporter

Anahad O'Connor (born May 23, 1981) is an American journalist and staff reporter for The Washington Post, where he writes about food and nutrition. He joined the Post in 2022, having previously worked at The New York Times since 2003. He is also a bestselling author.

O'Connor was born and grew up on the Lower East Side of Manhattan. He studied neuroscience and has a degree in psychology from Yale University. His book The 10 Things You Need to Eat made The New York Times Bestseller list in 2010. He was part of the first class of the New York Times College Scholarship Program in 1999.

== Bibliography ==
- Lose It!: The Personalized Weight Loss Revolution (2010)
- The 10 Things You Need to Eat: And More Than 100 Easy and Delicious Ways to Prepare Them (2009)
- Always Follow the Elephants: More Surprising Facts and Misleading Myths About Our Health and the World We Live In (2009)
- Never Shower in a Thunderstorm: Surprising Facts and Misleading Myths About Our Health and the World We Live In (2007)
