= Jonathan Lash =

American attorney & academic (born 1945)

6th President of Hampshire College
- In office 2011–2018
- Preceded by: Ralph J. Hexter; Marlene Gerber Fried (interim)
- Succeeded by: Miriam E. Nelson

Personal details
- Born: August 12, 1945 (age 81) New York City, New York, U.S.
- Education: Harvard University (BA); Catholic University of America (MA, JD)

Jonathan Lash (born August 12, 1945) is an American attorney who was the sixth president of Hampshire College (2011–2018) and member of the board of directors of the World Resources Institute where he served as president from 1993 to 2011. He resigned as president of Hampshire effective June 30, 2018.

He assumed the role of sixth president of Hampshire College in May 2011 and was inaugurated on April 27, 2011.

In 1993, he became president of the World Resources Institute. From 1993 to 1999, Lash was co-chair of the President's Council on Sustainable Development. He played a key role in the creation of the U.S. Climate Action Partnership, which in 2007 issued the "Call to Action" on global warming.

From 1987 to 1990, Lash served as Secretary of the Vermont Agency of Natural Resources, having served the previous two years as Vermont's Commissioner of Environmental Conservation. During his tenure in Vermont government, Lash helped write, win enactment of and implement statutes on issues ranging from pollution prevention and solid waste management to protection of streams. In 1990 he became director of the Environmental Law Center at the Vermont Law School, rated the best program of its kind in the United States.

A former Peace Corps volunteer and federal prosecutor, Lash worked as a senior staff attorney at the Natural Resources Defense Council (NRDC) from 1978 to 1985, litigating and lobbying on issues related to pollution control, federal coal leasing, strip mining, and energy conservation.

== Bibliography ==
- A Season of Spoils: The Reagan Administration's Attack on the Environment, by Jonathan Lash, David Sheridan, and Katherine Gillman, New York: Pantheon Books, 1984.
