= Dana Randall =

American computer scientist

- Born: Queens, New York City
- Education: Harvard University (AB); University of California, Berkeley (PhD)
- Relatives: Lisa Randall (sister)
- Awards: Fellow of the American Mathematical Society, Fellow of the Association for Computing Machinery, Outstanding Service Award, Georgia Tech
- Scientific career
- Fields: Theoretical computer science
- Workplaces: Georgia Institute of Technology
- Thesis: Counting in Lattices: Some Combinatorial Problems from Statistical Mechanics (1994)
- Doctoral advisor: Alistair Sinclair

Dana Randall is an American computer scientist. She is a Regents' professor of computer science and adjunct professor of mathematics at the Georgia Institute of Technology. She is also an external professor of the Santa Fe Institute. Previously she was executive director of the Georgia Tech Institute of Data Engineering and Science (IDEaS) that she co-founded, director of the Algorithms and Randomness Center, and served as the ADVANCE Professor of Computing. Her research areas include combinatorics, computational aspects of statistical mechanics, Monte Carlo stimulation of Markov chains, randomized algorithms and programmable active matter.

== Education ==
Randall was born in Queens, New York. She graduated from New York City's Stuyvesant High School in 1984. She received her A.B. in Mathematics from Harvard University in 1988 and her Ph.D. in computer science from the University of California, Berkeley in 1994 under the supervision of Alistair Sinclair.

Her sister is theoretical physicist Lisa Randall.

== Research ==
Her primary research interest is analyzing algorithms for counting problems (e.g. counting matchings in a graph) using Markov chains. One of her important contributions to this area is a decomposition theorem for analyzing Markov chains.

== Accolades ==
In 2012 she became a fellow of the American Mathematical Society. She was named as an ACM Fellow, in the 2024 class of fellows, "for contributions to the theory of Markov chains and programmable active matter".

She delivered the Arnold Ross Lecture on October 29, 2009, an honor previously conferred on Barry Mazur, Elwyn Berlekamp, Ken Ribet, Manjul Bhargava, David Kelly and Paul Sally.

== Publications ==
- Clustering in interfering models of binary mixtures
