= Miriam E. Nelson =

American health and nutrition scholar, policy advisor and author

Past president and CEO, Newmans Own Foundation
- In office 2019–2023

Personal details
- Born: 1960 (age 65–66) Media, Pennsylvania, U.S.
- Spouse: Kinloch Earle
- Children: 3
- Education: University of Vermont (BS); Tufts University (PhD)
- Occupation: Health and nutrition scholar, policy advisor
- Writing career
- Subject: Nutrition, food security and sustainability, public health, women's health, children's health
- Notable works: New York Times bestselling author of the Strong Women series
- Notable awards: Books for a Better Life Award

Miriam E. Nelson (born 1960) is an American health and nutrition scholar, policy advisor, and author. She is the former president and CEO of Newman's Own Foundation, an independent, private foundation formed in 2005 by actor and race car driver Paul Newman to sustain the legacy of his philanthropic work.

Nelson is author of the Strong Women book series, which includes 10 titles, five of which became New York Times bestsellers. The series has sold more than one million copies and has been translated into 14 languages. She has authored or co-authored more than 150 scientific studies, research papers and policy reports. Her most recent research focuses on food sustainability and food systems.

== Personal life ==
Nelson grew up in Media, Pennsylvania, a suburb of Philadelphia. Nelson's father was a senior executive at Scott Paper Company and her mother is an artist. Throughout her youth, Nelson was an avid horseback rider, competing at the national level in Three-Day Equestrian events. She graduated from the Tatnall School in Wilmington, Delaware. She earned her undergraduate degree from the University of Vermont (class of 1983, magna cum laude) majoring in nutrition and a PhD in 1987 from Tufts University. Nelson is married to Kinloch Earle, a classical violinist.

== Career ==
In 1983, Nelson began her career in nutrition and physical activity research as a doctoral fellow in the Human Physiology Laboratory at the Jean Mayer USDA Human Nutrition Research Center on Aging at Tufts University. Nelson’s research on the effects of nutrition and strength training on bone health in older adults provided the evidence for her Strong Women book series.

Nelson served one year as an AAAS Congressional Fellow for Senator Patrick Leahy in 1987. In 1989, Nelson returned to Tufts University to further pursue her research. Nelson conducted research and public policy work at the Gerald J. and Dorothy R. Friedman School of Nutrition Science and Policy in 1990 and is professor emeritus there.

In 1999, Nelson founded the Center for Physical Fitness, whose name was changed in 2002 to the John Hancock Research Center on Physical Activity, Nutrition, and Obesity Prevention at Tufts University. For 15 years she directed the center, the research, policy and civic engagement of which contributed to the reduction of childhood obesity and improvements in women’s health in the United States for over two decades, and directly reached more than 11 million children and women with sustained programming. Nelson also co-founded ChildObesity180, and through that organization, worked with First Lady Michelle Obama on her Let’s Move campaign.

In 2008 she served as the vice-chair of the Physical Activity Guidelines Advisory Committee for the US Department of Health and Human Services. The report was used to develop the inaugural Physical Activity Guidelines for Americans released in October 2008. Nelson also served on the 2010 and 2015 Dietary Guidelines for Americans Committee for the US Department of Agriculture and US Department of Health and Human Services. Within the 2015 DGAC, Nelson spearheaded the influential work on dietary guidance and sustainability. From 2011 to 2014, she served as a member of the Science Board of the President's Council on Fitness, Sports, and Nutrition, chairing in 2013.

In 2018, Nelson was appointed as the seventh president of Hampshire College, succeeding Jonathan Lash. On January 15, 2019, Nelson and the Board of Trustees announced that due to financial instability the college was planning to seek a strategic partner to ensure long-term sustainability. In the wake of disagreement over the course of action, Nelson, along with the chair and vice chair of the board of trustees, and several other trustees, stepped down from their respective positions in April 2019.

Nelson joined the board of directors for Newman's Own, Inc., in 2015, stepping down in 2019 to assume a leadership role at Newmans Own Foundation. Nelson then served as acting president of Newman's Own Foundation from January to December 2020 and was named CEO and president of the Foundation in January 2021.

== Strong Women book series ==
Nelson is the author of the ten books in the Strong Women series, including five New York Times bestsellers. The titles include: Strong Women Stay Young; Strong Women Stay Slim; Strong Women, Strong Bones; Strong Women Eat Well; Strong Women and Men Beat Arthritis; The Strong Women’s Journal; Strong Women, Strong Hearts; Strong Women, Strong Backs; and The Strong Women’s Guide to Total Health. Strong Women, Strong Bones received the "Books for a Better Life Award" for best wellness book of 2000 from the Multiple Sclerosis Society. Nelson’s tenth book, The Social Network Diet: Change Yourself, Change the World, was published in 2011. Nelson’s co-authors on the books include Dr. Ronenn Roubenoff, Dr. Kristin Baker, Dr. Alice H. Lichtenstein, Larry Lindner, Sarah Wernick, Judy Knipe, and Jennifer Ackerman.

Following the success of the book series, Nelson and Rebecca Seguin, Ph.D., co-founded the StrongWomen program to empower people to live healthier lives.

Nelson appeared in her own PBS special entitled Strong Women Live Well and served as the chief scientific adviser for PBS’s NOVA Marathon Challenge documentary.
