= Adele Simmons =

American academic (born 1941)

Adele S. Simmons
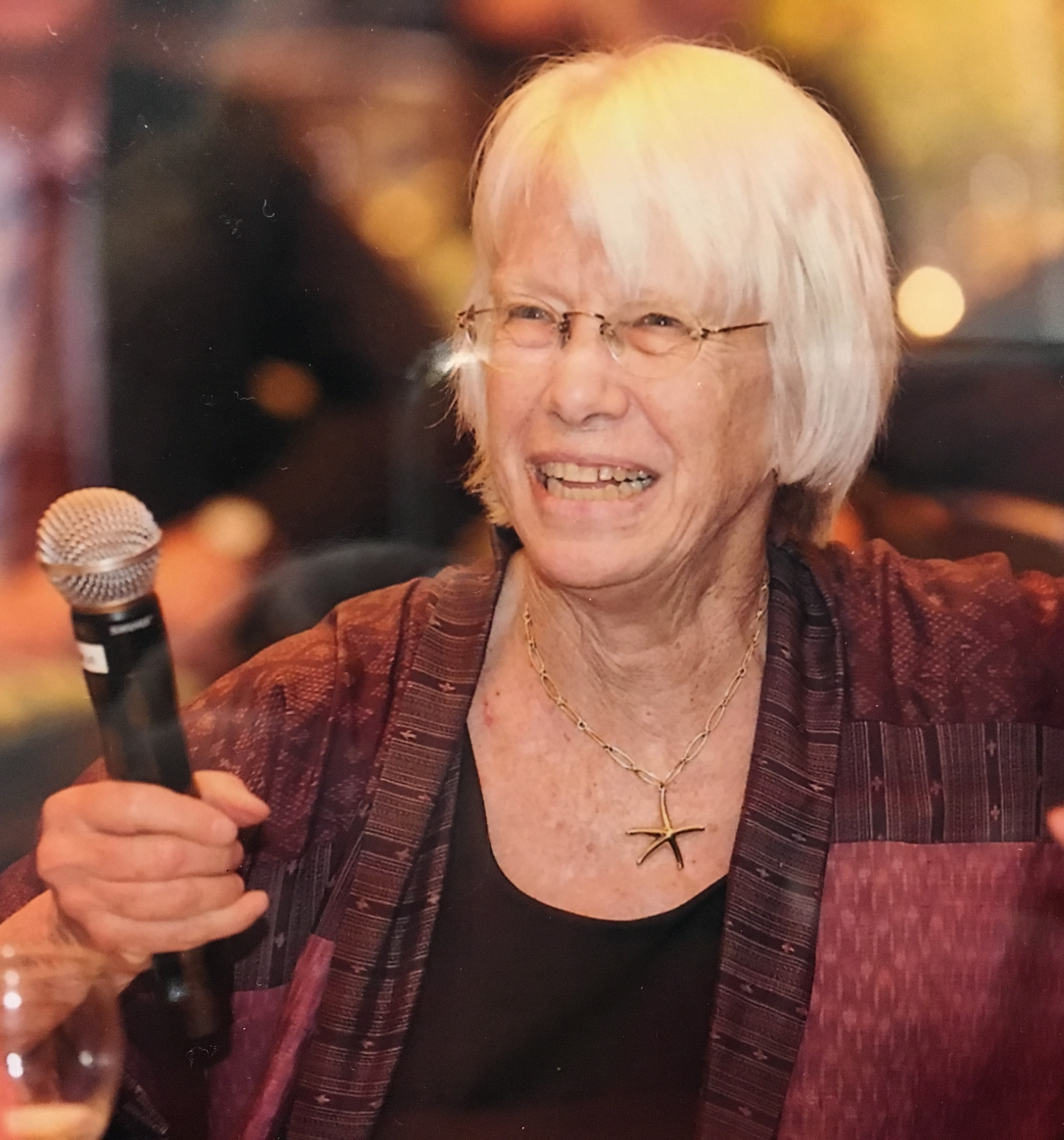
- Simmons in 2016

2nd President of John D. and Catherine T. MacArthur Foundation
- In office 1989–1999
- Preceded by: John E. Corbally
- Succeeded by: Jonathan F. Fanton

3rd President of Hampshire College
- In office 1977–1989
- Preceded by: Charles R. Longsworth
- Succeeded by: Gregory S. Prince Jr.

Personal details
- Born: Adele Dunlap Smith; June 21, 1941 (age 85) Lake Forest, Illinois, United States
- Spouse: John Leroy Simmons (after 1966)
- Children: 3
- Parent(s): Hermon Dunlap Smith; Ellen Thorne
- Education: Radcliffe College (B.A., 1963); University of Oxford (Ph.D., 1969)

Adele Smith Simmons (born June 21, 1941) is an American academic, business director, philanthropist, academic administrator, the third president of Hampshire College in Amherst, Massachusetts, from 1977 to 1989 and the second president of the John D. and Catherine T. MacArthur Foundation from 1989 to 1999. Simmons also served as the dean of student affairs at Princeton University, from 1972 to 1977, where she was the first female dean.

Simmons currently serves as the president of the Global Philanthropy Partnership, a Chicago-based organization that "provides information and resources to donors and donor advisors interested in addressing issues of global importance."

== Biography ==
=== Early life ===
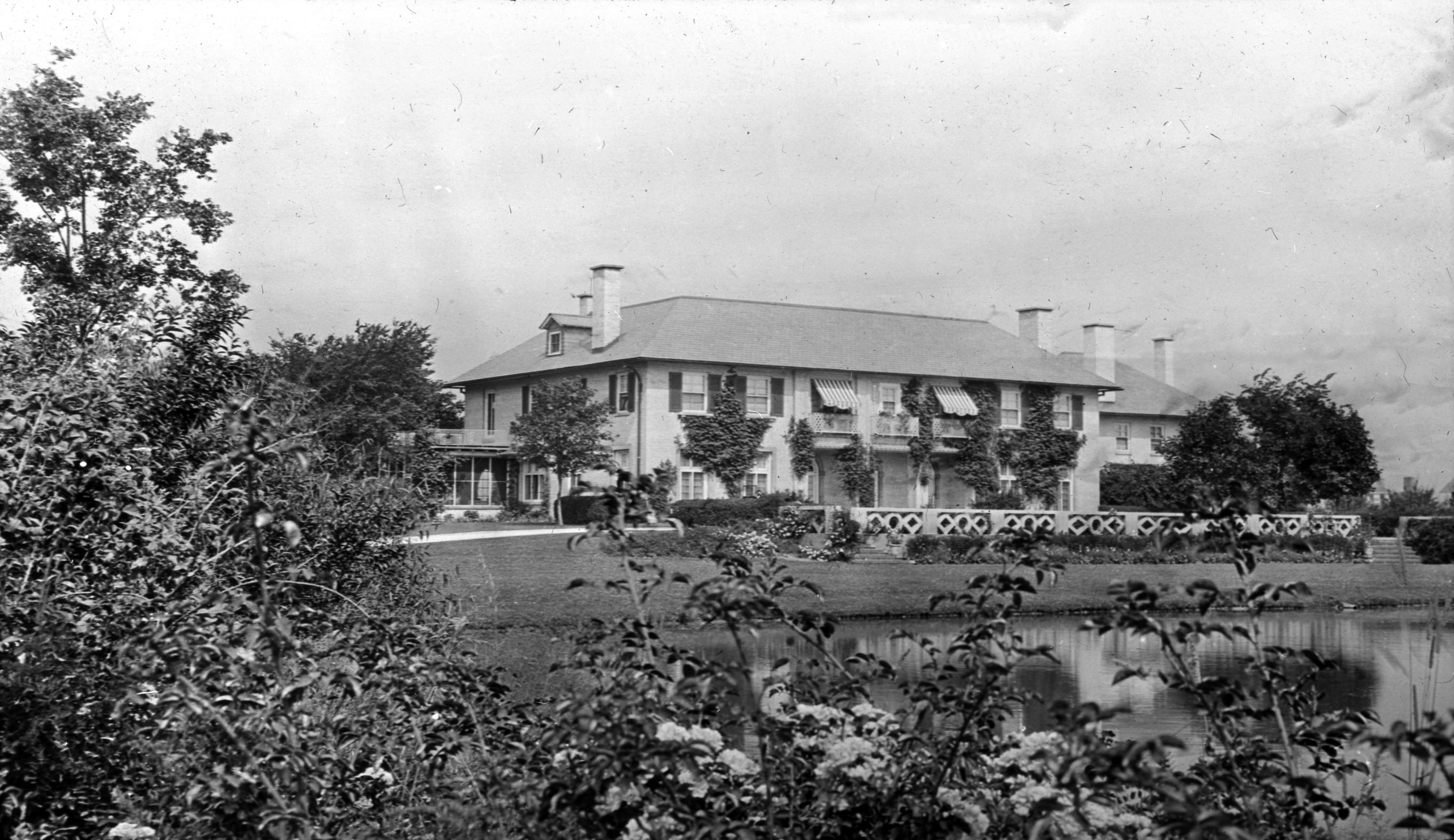
Lake Forest, Illinois, where Simmons was born and raised

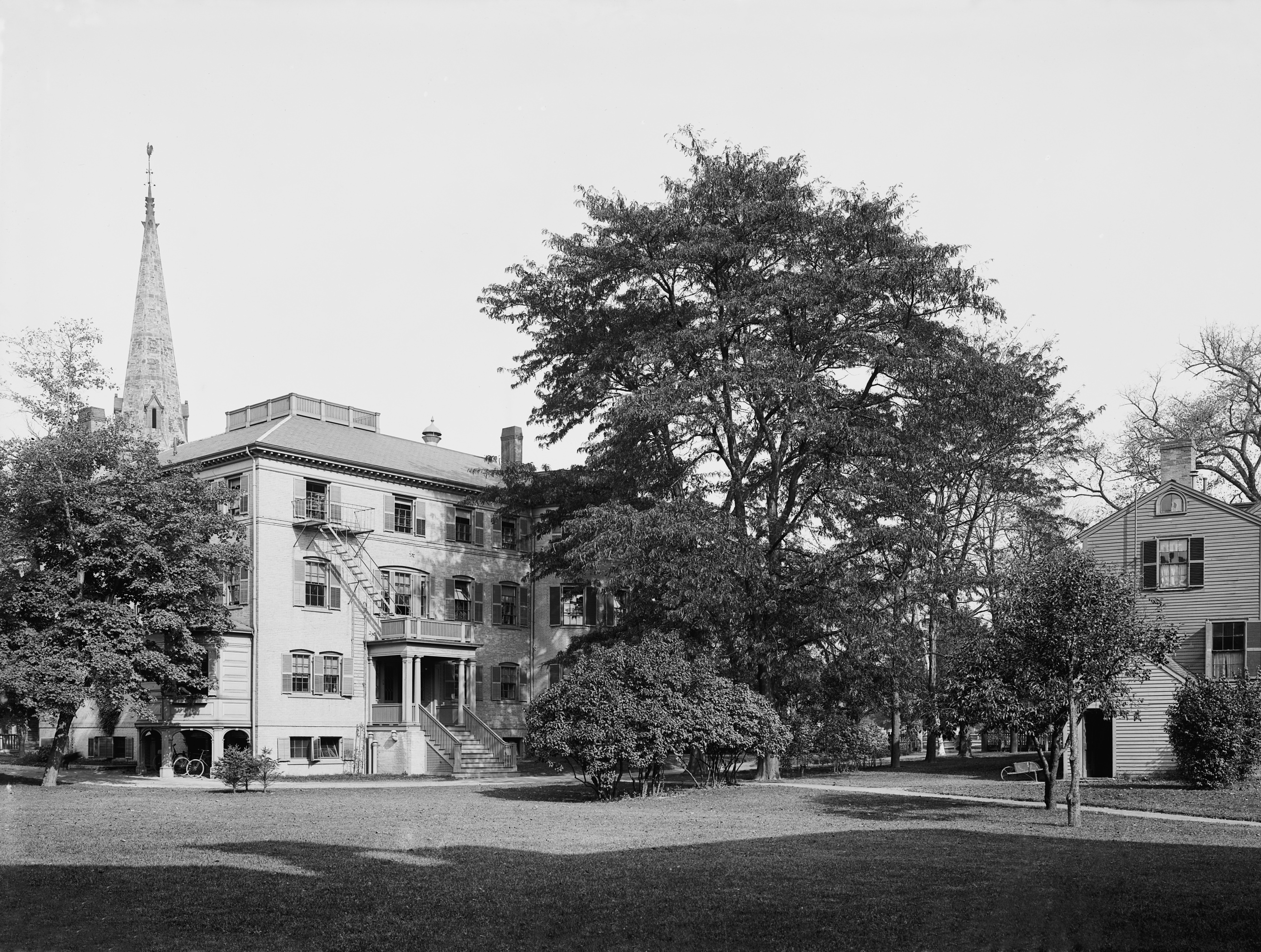
Radcliffe College in Cambridge, Massachusetts, where Simmons graduated with a B.A. in 1963

Simmons, born Adele Dunlap Smith, was born on June 21, 1941, in Lake Forest, Illinois, to Hermon Dunlap Smith, former president of Marsh & McLennan who died in 1983, and Ellen Thorne, an ornithologist who died in 1977. Simmons grew up in Lake Forest, Illinois, an affluent suburb of Chicago. She has two sisters, Deborah Haight and Ellen Buchen, and one brother, Farwell Smith. Her father, Hermon Dunlap Smith was the president, chairman and chief executive officer of Marsh & McLennan Inc., the International Insurance Brokers, and chairman of the Field Foundation of Illinois. Simmons later attended Garrison Forest School, an exclusive girls' boarding school outside Baltimore, Maryland.

=== Education ===
Simmons attended Radcliffe College in Cambridge, Massachusetts, where she graduated with a B.A. in 1963. While at Radcliffe College, Simmons served as a protégé of the college's president, Mary Bunting. Simmons subsequently attended Oxford University in Oxford, England, where she graduated with a Ph.D. in African history in 1969. For her doctoral thesis, Simmons stayed on the island of Mauritius in the Indian Ocean, gathering material for a book and for her doctoral thesis. Simmons went on to work as a reporter for The Economist from 1968 to 1969, where she covered North Africa before returning to Cambridge, Massachusetts.

=== Career positions ===
Simmons' past academic administrative positions include professor of African studies at Tufts University, dean of Jackson College for Women at Tufts University, professor of history at Princeton University, dean of student affairs at Princeton University (1972–77), Harvard University Harvard Board of Overseers board member (1972–79) where she was one of the first women elected, president of Hampshire College (1977–89), and president of the John D. and Catherine T. MacArthur Foundation, from 1989 to 1999.

=== President of Hampshire College ===
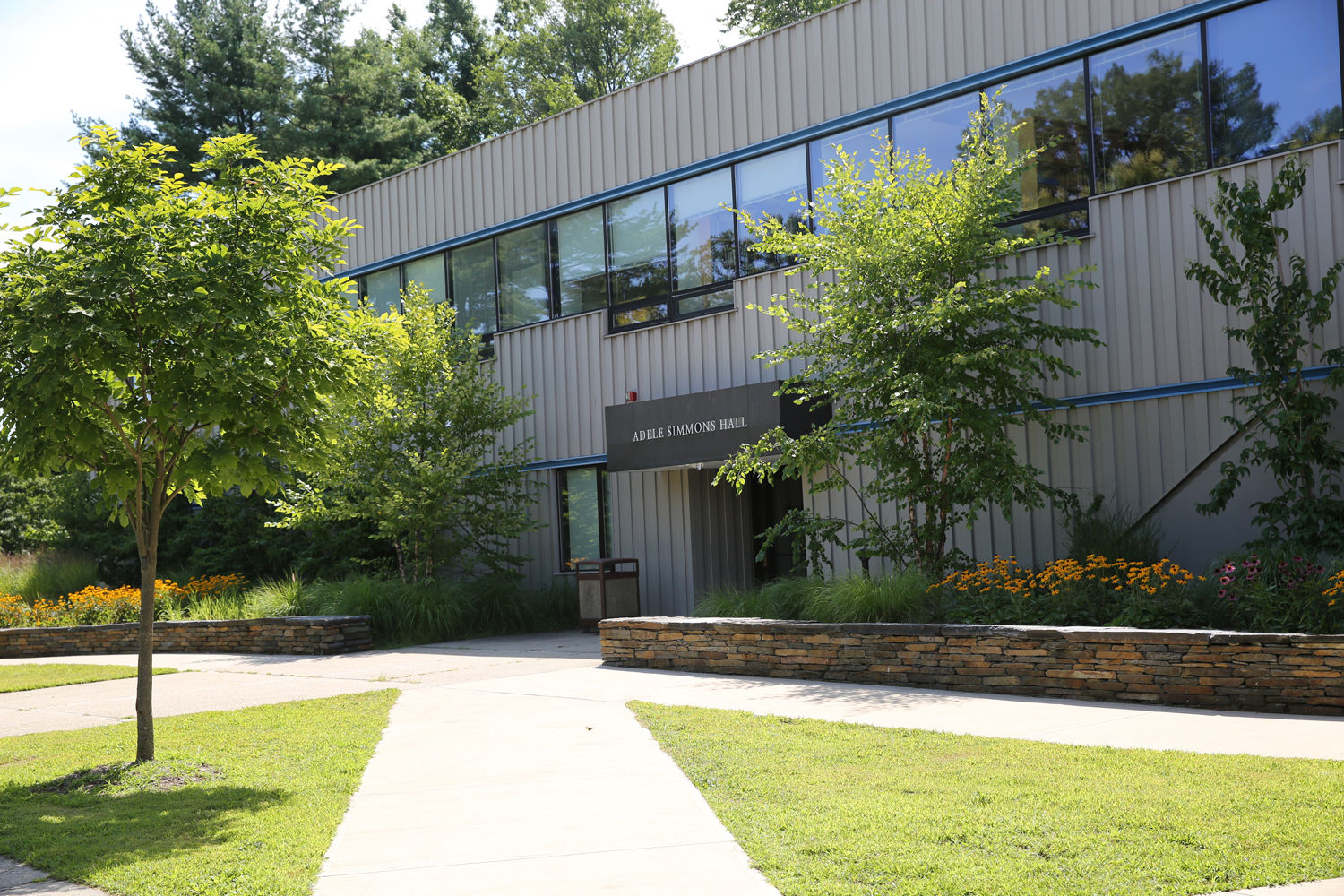
Adele Simmons Hall at Hampshire College, named in Simmons' honor

Simmons served as president of Hampshire College in Amherst, Massachusetts, from 1977 to 1989. Simmons, the first woman president of Hampshire College, was one of very few women to head a coeducational college in the United States during her term as president. During her term as president, Simmons raised Hampshire's endowment by $8 million and raised the number of students receiving financial aid from 20 percent, on her arrival in 1977, to 50 percent. At Hampshire College, the Adele Simmons Hall (or ASH), a facility that is home to Hampshire's School of Cognitive Science, was named in her honor.

=== Other administrative positions ===
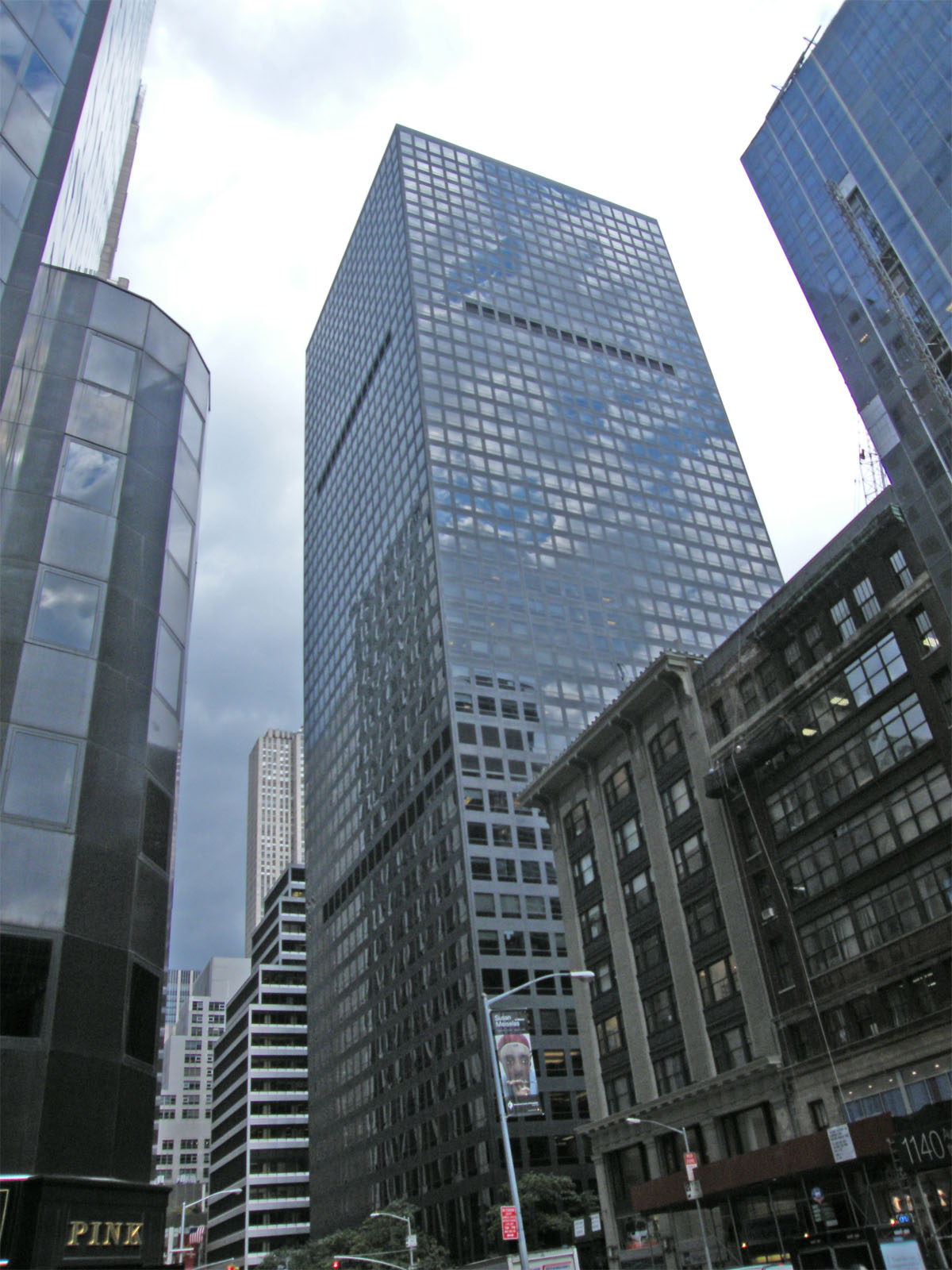
Headquarters of Marsh & McLennan, which Simmons' father was president of and which she served as the director of from 1978 to 2015

Simmons has also held several other administrative positions throughout her career. "Mrs. Simmons also served as a director of Marsh & McLennan Companies, Inc., since 1978 until May 20, 2015. She served as president of the John D. and Catherine T. MacArthur Foundation, from 1989 to 1999. She previously served as a director of ShoreBank. She served as a director of First Chicago Corporation, since 1990 and The First National Bank of Chicago, a subsidiary of First Chicago Corporation. She served as a director of First Chicago NBD, since December 1995.

Simmons is the current president of the Global Philanthropy Partnership. Simmons serves as a senior associate of the Center for International Studies at the University of Chicago and vice chair of Chicago Metropolis 2020 (Metropolis Strategies). She serves as a director of the Field Museum of Natural History in Chicago, Synergos Institute, the Rocky Mountain Institute, the Global Fund for Women, the Union of Concerned Scientists, and The American Prospect. She serves as advisory trustee of Environmental Defense Fund. She is chair of the committee to visit the Graduate School of Education at Harvard University, a member of the Advisory Board of the World Bank Institute and a senior advisor to The World Economic Forum."

== Personal life ==
Simmons, then Adele Dunlap Smith, married John Leroy Simmons on September 18, 1966. The couple have three children.

In August 2013, Simmons and her husband, John, sold their 8,500-square-foot, six-bedroom Lincoln Park, Chicago home on Arlington Place for nearly $2.83 million.
