= Lenore Cowen =

American mathematician and computer scientist

Lenore Jennifer Cowen is an American mathematician and computer scientist known for her work in graph coloring, network routing, and computational biology. She is a professor of computer science and (by courtesy) of mathematics at Tufts University.

== Early life and education ==
Cowen is the daughter of Robert Cowen, a professor of mathematics at Queens College, City University of New York, and Ilsa Cowen, a high school English teacher. She has been a classical violin player since the age of five, and as a student at Benjamin N. Cardozo High School in Bayside, Queens, she edited the school poetry magazine. However, despite these other interests, she decided to aim for a mathematical career after attending a summer mathematics program for high school students, the Hampshire College Summer Studies in Mathematics.

She started her studies at Yale University at age 16, and graduated in 1987 with a bachelor's degree in mathematics, also winning the university's deForest Prize as the top graduate in mathematics that year. She went to the Massachusetts Institute of Technology for graduate study in applied mathematics, completing her Ph.D. in 1993 with a dissertation On Local Representations of Graphs and Networks supervised by Daniel Kleitman.

== Career ==
After postdoctoral research at Rutgers University and the Institute for Mathematics and Its Applications at the University of Minnesota, Cowen joined the Johns Hopkins University faculty in 1994 as an assistant professor of mathematical sciences. She moved to the computer science department of Tufts University in 2000, added a joint appointment in mathematics in 2004, and was promoted to full professor at Tufts in 2009.

In 2020 she became the principal investigator for the newly formed Tufts Center for Transdisciplinary Research in Principles Of Data Science (T-TRIPODS).

== Recognition ==
In 2020, the Education Committee of the Computing Research Association gave Cowen their CRA-E Undergraduate Research Faculty Mentoring Award, for her work with undergraduates at Tufts on interdisciplinary methods in computational biology and data science. She was elected to the 2023 Class of SIAM Fellows.
