= New York Times College Scholarship Program =

Academic scholarship sponsored by the newspaper

The New York Times College Scholarship Program is an academic scholarship competition for New York City high school seniors. Past winners have demonstrated academic achievement, a drive for success — especially in the face of financial and other obstacles — and community service. Furthermore, candidates whose parents did not attend college are favored. Between 1999 and 2008, 20 scholars were announced per year. In 2009, the New York Times selected only 12 winners due to financial hardships. In 2010, that number was halved to six. In 2014, 10 scholars were selected. There are a total of 253 Scholars to date.

== Program entry requirements ==
To enter the competition, a student must

- be enrolled full-time at a New York City public, private or parochial high school, progressing normally toward completion of high school and planning to enroll full-time in college in the fall following the completion of high school
- be an American citizen or have a valid green card and alien registration number

== Steps in the competition ==
=== Initial application ===
Each year the New York Times receives roughly 1500 applications from seniors residing in New York City. The initial application includes an essay, a list of achievements and accomplishments, and the actual application which contains biographical and academic information. Applications are generally due mid-October.

=== Semifinals ===
A total of 150 semifinalists are chosen from the original application pool. These semifinalists must complete an extensive follow-up application, due early January, which consists of:

- Additional three essays
- Two letters of recommendation
- Official high school transcript and SAT scores
- Family's financial information

=== Finals ===
Approximately 35 finalists are selected in February who are called in for a personal interview with the New York Times. Finalists must also submit an updated transcript with the senior year Fall semester grades.

=== The New York Times Scholars ===
By March, 10 Times Scholars are selected. The New York Times Scholars receive:

- UP TO $15,500 scholarship for each of the four years in college
- Laptop computer
- Summer jobs and internships at The New York Times and other organizations
- Advice and mentoring before and during college
