= Judy Goldsmith (computer scientist) =

American computer scientist

Judith Anne Goldsmith is a computer scientist whose publications span a wide range of topics including artificial intelligence, computational complexity theory, decision theory, and computer science education. She is a professor of computer science at the University of Kentucky.

== Education and career ==
Goldsmith graduated from Princeton University in 1982, with a bachelor's degree in mathematics. She completed her Ph.D. at the University of Wisconsin–Madison in mathematics (with a minor in computer science) in 1988. Her dissertation, Polynomial Isomorphisms and Near-Testable Sets, was supervised by Deborah Joseph.

After short-term positions as a lecturer at the University of Wisconsin-Madison, research instructor at Dartmouth College, and NSF visiting professor at Boston University, she joined the computer science faculty at the University of Manitoba in 1991. She moved to the University of Kentucky in 1993.

== Public opinion ==
In computer science education, Goldsmith has spoken in favor of using science fiction in preference to case studies for teaching the ethics of artificial intelligence. She is Jewish, and participates in the Lexington, Kentucky, Havurah. Dr. Goldsmith serves on the board of Sapiens Plurum, which offers annual prizes for short science fiction that envisions options for a better future.

== Recognition ==
Goldsmith won the Mentor Award of the American Association for the Advancement of Science in 1997.

== Selected publications ==
- Buss, Jonathan F.; Goldsmith, Judy (1993), "Nondeterminism within $\mathrm{P}^*$", SIAM Journal on Computing, 22 (3): 560–572, doi:10.1137/0222038, MR 1219041
- Littman, Michael L.; Goldsmith, Judy; Mundhenk, Martin (1998), "The computational complexity of probabilistic planning", Journal of Artificial Intelligence Research, 9: 1–36, arXiv:cs/9808101, Bibcode:1998cs........8101L, doi:10.1613/jair.505, MR 1654163, S2CID 47329118
- Mundhenk, Martin; Goldsmith, Judy; Lusena, Christopher; Allender, Eric (2000), "Complexity of finite-horizon Markov decision process problems", Journal of the ACM, 47 (4): 681–720, doi:10.1145/347476.347480, MR 1866174, S2CID 5087765
- Goldsmith, Judy; Lang, Jérôme; Truszczyński, Miroslaw; Wilson, Nic (2008), "The computational complexity of dominance and consistency in CP-nets", Journal of Artificial Intelligence Research, 33: 403–432, arXiv:1401.3453, doi:10.1613/jair.2627, MR 2487345, S2CID 1626851
