= David Kelly (mathematics educator) =

American mathematician (1940–2025)

- Kelly in retirement, 2015
- Born: June 16, 1940; New Rochelle, New York
- Died: June 10, 2025 (aged 84)
- Education: Princeton (AB), MIT (SM), Dartmouth (AM)
- Occupations: Mathematician and professor
- Known for: Founding HCSSiM; co-creating Yellow Pigs Day
- Spouse: Al McNeely
- Awards: Fellow of the American Mathematical Society
- Website: ypmathfoundation.org

David C. Kelly (1940–2025) was a professor of mathematics at Hampshire College in Amherst, Massachusetts. Kelly founded and directed the Hampshire College Summer Studies in Mathematics program (HCSSiM) for talented high-school students.

== Early life and education ==
Kelly was originally from New Rochelle, New York, but moved frequently as the child of a military father. He held an AB degree from Princeton, an SM from MIT (after stopping out from a doctoral program there) and an AM from Dartmouth.

== Career and later life ==
Kelly taught at Talladega College, New College and Oberlin College before joining Hampshire College in 1970 as one of its founding faculty members. After ten years of teaching summer math programs at St. Paul's School and University of New Hampshire, in 1971 he founded the Hampshire College Summer Studies in Mathematics, an annual six-week program for mathematically talented high-school students. He continued to direct the program until his death.

He died on June 10, 2025, shortly before his 85th birthday. He was survived by his husband of 17 years and partner of 51 years, Al McNeely.

== Yellow pigs and 17 ==
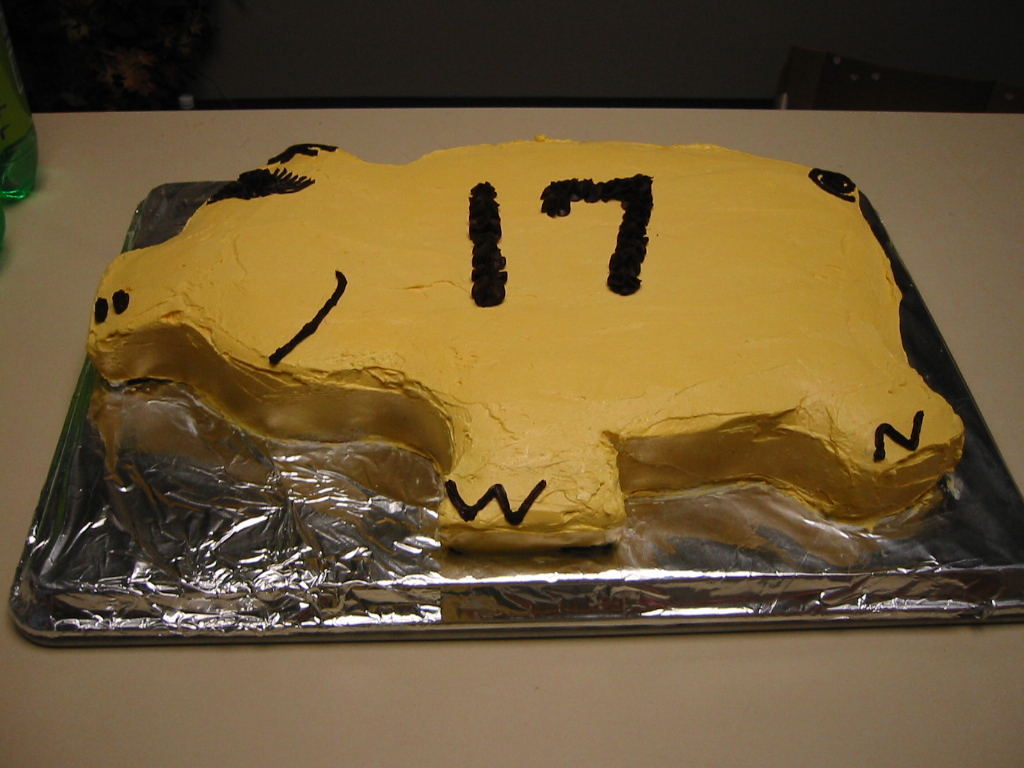
Yellow Pigs Day cake (2004)

After meeting as Princeton students in the early 1960s, later in the decade Kelly and fellow mathematician Michael Spivak created "Yellow Pigs Day," an annual celebration of mathematics and the number 17. The HCSSiM program organizes the holiday each year on July 17, commemorating the day with a reunion, mathematics, food and songs. Kelly was expertly familiar with the properties of the number 17, and gave a special lecture on the subject each summer.

When Kelly retired from the faculty in 2015, Hampshire College officially changed the campus speed limit to 17 mph in his honor, reflecting his lifelong fascination with the number.

== Legacy and recognition ==
Kelly was well known for his inquiry-based teaching style. He often used the phrases "Interesting, if true" and "Let's find out" to encourage students to explore mathematical ideas. Through his leadership at HCSSiM, he fostered a unique mathematical community that influenced generations of students. Kelly was elected to the 2026 class of Fellows of the American Mathematical Society, but died before he could celebrate this honor.

=== Hunting Yellow Pigs documentary ===
In 2026, the feature-length documentary Hunting Yellow Pigs was officially released. Directed by HCSSiM alumnus Jon Roberts, who executive-produced with Ming-I Huang, the film explores the unique community and "questions-first" philosophy that Kelly established at HCSSiM. It includes interviews with dozens of prominent mathematicians and alumni, including Eric Lander, Lisa Randall, Steven Strogatz and Lisa Su, and chronicles the program's quirky traditions and its influence on American mathematics education. The film was selected as "Best Documentary" by Tokyo's Golden Harvest Film Festival.
