= Tamar Haspel =

American journalist

- Occupation: Food columnist
- Employer: The Washington Post

Tamar Haspel is an American columnist who "writes on the intersection of food and science" for The Washington Post. Her column "Unearthed" has twice been nominated for the James Beard Foundation Award, which she won in 2015. Her piece "How to get people to cook more? Get eaters to complain less" was anthologized in The Best Food Writing 2015. She is the author of the 2022 book To Boldly Grow about the pleasures and perils of growing, killing and harvesting your own food.
