= Hampshire College =

Private liberal arts college in Amherst, Massachusetts, US (1965–2026)

- Motto: "Non satis scire"
- Motto in English: "To Know Is Not Enough"
- Type: Private liberal arts college
- Established: 1965
- Accreditation: NECHE (until December 31, 2026)
- Academic affiliations: Five College Consortium; CLAC; Project Pericles; NAICU
- Endowment: $26.5 million (2024)
- Budget: $35.7 million
- President: Jennifer Chrisler
- Faculty: 47 (fall 2024)
- Administrative staff: 249 (fall 2024)
- Undergraduates: 844 (fall 2024)
- Location: Amherst, Massachusetts, U.S. 42.3250°N 72.5325°W
- Campus: Rural, 800 acres (320 ha)
- Colors: Teal, black, forest green, gold
- Website: hampshire.edu
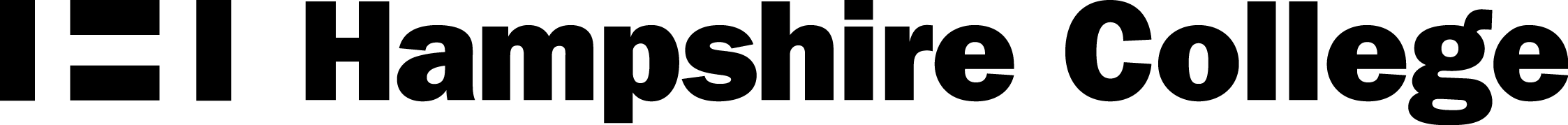

Hampshire College is a private liberal arts college in Amherst, Massachusetts, United States. It was established in 1965 as an experiment in alternative education, in association with four other colleges in the Pioneer Valley: Amherst College, Smith College, Mount Holyoke College, and the University of Massachusetts Amherst. Together, the institutions have been known as the Five College Consortium.

The college uses an alternative curriculum, with an emphasis on progressive pedagogy and self-directed academic concentrations, a focus on portfolios rather than distribution requirements, and a reliance on narrative evaluations instead of grades and GPAs.

Hampshire College alumni, faculty, and researchers include a Nobel laureate, five MacArthur Fellows, 32 Fulbright scholars, and seven members of the National Academy of Sciences.

On April 14, 2026, the college's leaders announced that it would close after the fall 2026 semester, citing unresolved financial and accreditation pressures, along with a steep decline in enrollment.

Hampshire's campus houses the Yiddish Book Center and Eric Carle Museum, both of which are institutionally independent of the college, and hosts the annual Hampshire College Summer Studies in Mathematics.

== History ==
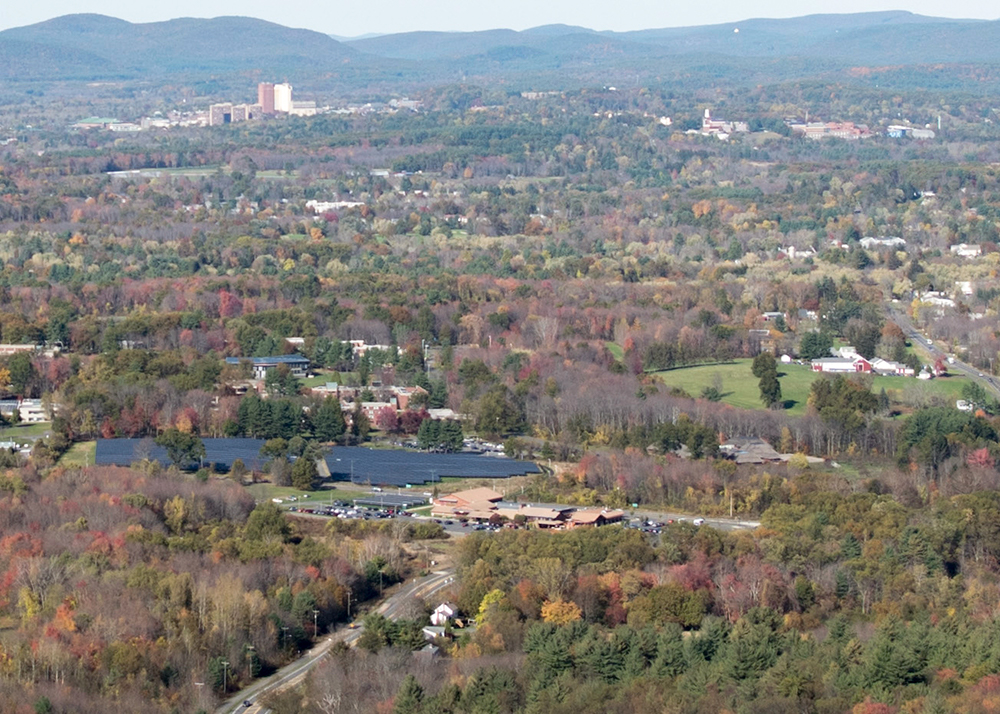
Hampshire College viewed from Bare Mountain in October 2017. Amherst College (top right) and The University of Massachusetts Amherst (top left) are both visible.

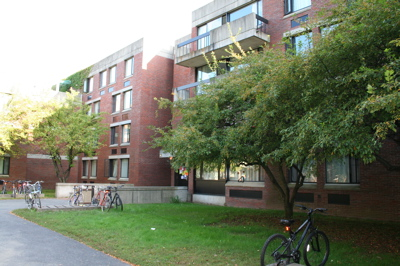
Dakin House dormitory

The idea for Hampshire College originated in 1958 when the presidents of Amherst, Mount Holyoke and Smith Colleges, as well as the University of Massachusetts Amherst, appointed a committee to examine the assumptions and practices of liberal arts education. Their report, "The New College Plan", advocated many of the features that have since been realized in the Hampshire curriculum: inviting students to self-design their program of studies; training students to be able to educate themselves through their lifetimes; emphasis on each student's curiosity and motivation; learning among and across multiple disciplines; and close mentoring relationships with teachers.

In 1965, Amherst College alumnus Harold F. Johnson, inspired by the New College Plan, donated $6 million toward the founding of Hampshire College. With a matching grant from the Ford Foundation, Hampshire's first trustees purchased 800 acres (3.2 km^{2}) of orchard and farmland in South Amherst, Massachusetts, and construction began.

One of the most important founding documents of Hampshire College is the book The Making of a College, written by the college's first president, Franklin Patterson, together with Hampshire's later second president, Charles Longsworth.

Hampshire admitted its first students in 1970. For several years immediately after its founding in the early 1970s, the large number of applications for matriculation caused Hampshire College to be among the most selective undergraduate programs in the United States. Its admissions selectivity declined after that because of declining application popularity. The school's number of applications increased again in the late 1990s, causing increased admissions selectivity.

In the mid-1990s, the college began establishing a "cultural village", making possible the residence of independent non-profit organizations on the campus. The cultural village includes the National Yiddish Book Center, the Eric Carle Museum of Picture Book Art and the Hitchcock Center for the Environment.

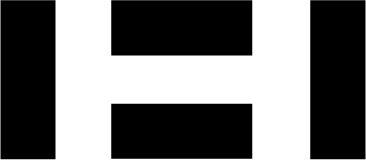
The 'H' logo of Hampshire College, used separately from the seal. The four bars represent the other four colleges that formed Hampshire.

On April 5, 2005, the board of trustees named Ralph Hexter, formerly a dean at University of California, Berkeley's College of Letters and Science, as the college's next president. The appointment made Hampshire one of a small number of colleges and universities in the United States with an openly gay president.

The Hampshire College Archives in the Harold F. Johnson Library has extensively documented the college's history between 1965 and 2005, accessible on the college's website.

On August 23, 2012, the school announced the establishment of a scholarship fund dedicated to helping undocumented students get degrees. It would provide more than $25,000 yearly to help an undocumented student pay for the $43,000-plus tuition.

The school has been financially challenged throughout its history, largely because it lacked a founding endowment to rely on for income stability. It has relied substantially on tuition income for operations. As of June 30, 2017, the endowment had risen to $48.5 million.

=== 2019 admissions pause ===
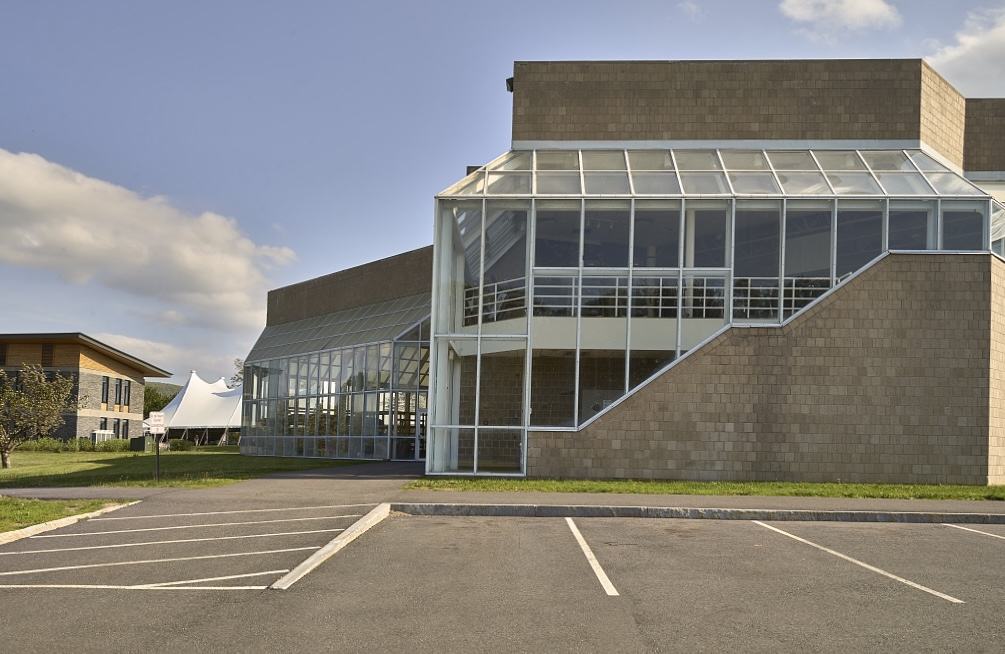
R.W. Kern Center (left) and Robert Crown Center (right) in 2019, photographed by Carol M. Highsmith

On January 15, 2019, president Miriam Nelson and the board of trustees announced that the college was planning to seek a strategic partner to ensure long-term sustainability due to financial instability and a small endowment. In February, the chancellor of the University of Massachusetts Amherst and Hampshire's president discussed a partnership between the two schools. UMass considered the idea, but only if Hampshire would be closed entirely and there were massive layoffs of its faculty. Hampshire wanted its name and its "spirit of interdisciplinary and independent studies" to continue, its students to be able to continue their studies at UMass, and that Hampshire's staff and faculty would be considered for positions at UMass. Ultimately, UMass and Hampshire could not agree.

In addition, the college was considering not accepting a new first-year class for fall 2019, due to concerns with compliance and accreditation. On February 1, the board of trustees voted that, for the fall 2019 semester, it would only be admitting about 60 students who had already been offered early admission or who had previously deferred admission until fall 2019. Early admission students were released from their pledge to attend Hampshire College.

Some alumni protested these decisions, as did many students, who organized sit-ins in the Dean of Students office and the Office of the President, demanding more transparency from the administration and board of trustees and for student, staff, and faculty voices to be taken into account in decision-making processes. The occupation in the Dean of Students office ended after a few weeks, and the sit-in in the president's office lasted for 75 days, ending on April 22, 2019.

Following an announcement that 30%–50% of the faculty and staff might be laid off, the faculty held a vote of no confidence in the administration. Because a binding motion is required to be public for seven days before it is acted on, the February 20 no-confidence vote was not binding. A week later, the majority of the faculty decided not to move forward with a binding vote of no confidence.

In March and April 2019, the chair, vice-chair, and six other members of the board of trustees resigned. Shortly afterward, the board announced a decision to prioritize remaining independent through a capital campaign led by alumnus Ken Burns. Ken Rosenthal was named interim president. The first round of layoffs primarily affected the admissions and fundraising offices, effective April 19, 2019. Ed Wingenbach became the new president in August, beginning an effort to revise the curriculum to increase interdisciplinarity, collaboration, and access.

In September 2019, the first-year class was 13 students. Total enrollment was around 750 students, substantially fewer students than typical, due to decreased retention rates.

=== Final years ===
A fundraising campaign, "Change in the Making: A Campaign for Hampshire", was launched in late 2019 to raise $60 million in unrestricted operating support by 2024. By March 2023, nearly $40 million had been raised. Documentarian Ken Burns, a Hampshire alumnus, served as co-chair. In November 2020, Hampshire received its largest single donation since its founding, $5 million, by alumnus James S. Crown and his wife, Paula H. Crown. Later that month, alumnus Lucy McFadden contributed $2 million. In January 2022, the college received an anonymous gift of $5 million to fund the Ken Burns Initiative to Transform Higher Education. In January 2023, Stonyfield Yogurt cofounder and Hampshire alumnus Gary Hirshberg invested $1 million in the campaign.

In 2020, Hampshire did away with departmental structures, reorganizing around global challenges like climate change, white supremacy, and life in a post-truth era.

In 2021, the college rebuilt its admissions operations, resulting in a 68 percent increase in enrollment over fall 2020 and a 100 percent increase in first-year enrollments over 2020. In the fall of 2022, Hampshire welcomed its largest entering class since 2018, with 275 new students.

On March 9, 2023, "in response to the continuing attacks on New College of Florida intended to limit intellectual exploration, turn back progress toward inclusion, and curtail open discussion of race, injustice, and histories of oppression," Hampshire College extended an invitation of admission to its students, matching their current cost of tuition.

=== 2026 closure announcement ===
In early 2026, Hampshire College faced renewed financial difficulties after enrollment declined from 842 students in autumn 2024 to 747 in autumn 2025. In March 2026, the New England Commission of Higher Education (NECHE), the college's accreditor, placed the college "on notice" over concerns tied to enrollment shortfalls and financial viability. The college would have needed to make their case to the commission at a June 2026 meeting. As of April 2026, the college voluntarily withdrew its accreditation from NECHE.

On April 14, 2026, the college announced it would wind down operations after the autumn 2026 semester. Contributing factors cited in reporting included the college's inability to refinance approximately $21 million in bond debt due by September 2026, a failed land sale, a declining unrestricted endowment, and an incoming class of 168 first-year students against a goal of 300.

Initially, it was announced that only students intending to graduate in December 2026 would be permitted to return in September to finish their degrees, with the school having planned to keep on a significantly smaller staff to serve them. However, NECHE later clarified that all Hampshire students will be allowed to return for the final semester, during which the school will remain accredited until its closure. All students still have the option to transfer during the spring semester.

As of May 6, 2026, transfer pathway agreements have been set up with three dozen schools, with varying admissions requirements, aid provisions, and credit mapping on a per-school basis. The pathways do not guarantee admission, but provide a streamlined process for transferring and admission windows past the typical due dates.

In July 2026, Hampshire College took a loan from Artocarpus Partners, LLC for $29.5 million in order to "keep Hampshire College solvent for its summer and fall teach-out."

Student records and transcripts will be held at the University of Massachusetts Amherst after December 31, 2026, when the school permanently ceases operations.

=== Presidents ===
- Franklin Patterson (1966–1971)
- Charles R. Longsworth (1971–1977)
- Adele S. Simmons (1977–1989)
- Gregory S. Prince, Jr. (1989–2005)
- Ralph J. Hexter (2005–2010)
- Marlene Gerber Fried (2010–2011) (interim)
- Jonathan Lash (2011–2018)
- Miriam E. Nelson (2018–2019)
- Kenneth Rosenthal (2019) (interim)
- Edward Wingenbach (2019–2025)
- Jennifer Chrisler (2025–present)

== Athletics ==
The college is a member of the United States Collegiate Athletic Association, primarily competing in the Yankee Small College Conference since the 2011–2012 academic year.

Hampshire competes in four intercollegiate varsity sports: men's soccer, women's basketball, and coed cross country and track & field. There are two club sports programs, ultimate frisbee and rock climbing.

== Campus publications ==
The oldest currently running publication at Hampshire is The Omen literary magazine, which published its first issue in 1993. The magazine accepts submissions from all students. The Omen published the first issue of its 61st volume in 2024.

== Academics ==
=== Admissions ===
Hampshire College stopped accepting SAT and ACT scores of applicants in 2014, reportedly to eliminate income and ethnicity biases in standardized testing and focus assessment on data better correlated with college success, and over a longer period of time, rather than a single high-pressure test. As a result, it was dropped from the U.S. News & World Report Best Colleges Ranking.

=== Curriculum ===
Hampshire College is accredited by the New England Commission of Higher Education. Hampshire College describes itself as "experimenting" rather than "experimental", to emphasize the changing nature of its curriculum. From its inception, the curriculum has generally had certain non-traditional features:

- An emphasis on project work as well as, or instead of, courses
- Detailed written evaluations (as well as portfolio evaluations) for completed courses and projects, rather than letter or number grades
- A curriculum centered on student interests, with students taking an active role in designing their own concentrations and projects
- An emphasis on independent motivation and student organization, both within and outside the college's formal curriculum

Emily Dickinson Hall, designed by the architecture firm of former faculty member Norton Juster, houses much of the humanities, creative writing, and theatre

The curriculum is divided into three "divisions" rather than four grade-years:

- Division I: Exploration and Working Across Disciplines
- Division II: Concentration
- Division III: Creating Knowledge

Division II takes up two years, while Divisions I and III take up one.

Its most popular majors, by 2021 graduates, were:

Creative Writing (33)
Art/Art Studies (20)
Film/Video & Photographic Arts (14)
Sociology (10)

=== Schools and programs ===
Cole Science Center contains the School of Natural Science and administrative offices

The Hampshire College faculty is organized broadly in defined Schools of thought:

- Cognitive Science (CS): includes linguistics, most psychology, some philosophy, neuroscience, and computer science.
- Humanities, Arts, and Cultural Studies (HACU): includes film, some studio arts, literature, media studies, architecture, art history, dance, music, and most philosophy.
- Critical Social Inquiry (CSI): includes most sociology and anthropology, economics, history, politics, and some psychology.
- Natural Science (NS): includes most traditional sciences, mathematics, and biological anthropology.
- Interdisciplinary Arts (IA): includes theater, some studio arts, creative writing, and social entrepreneurship.

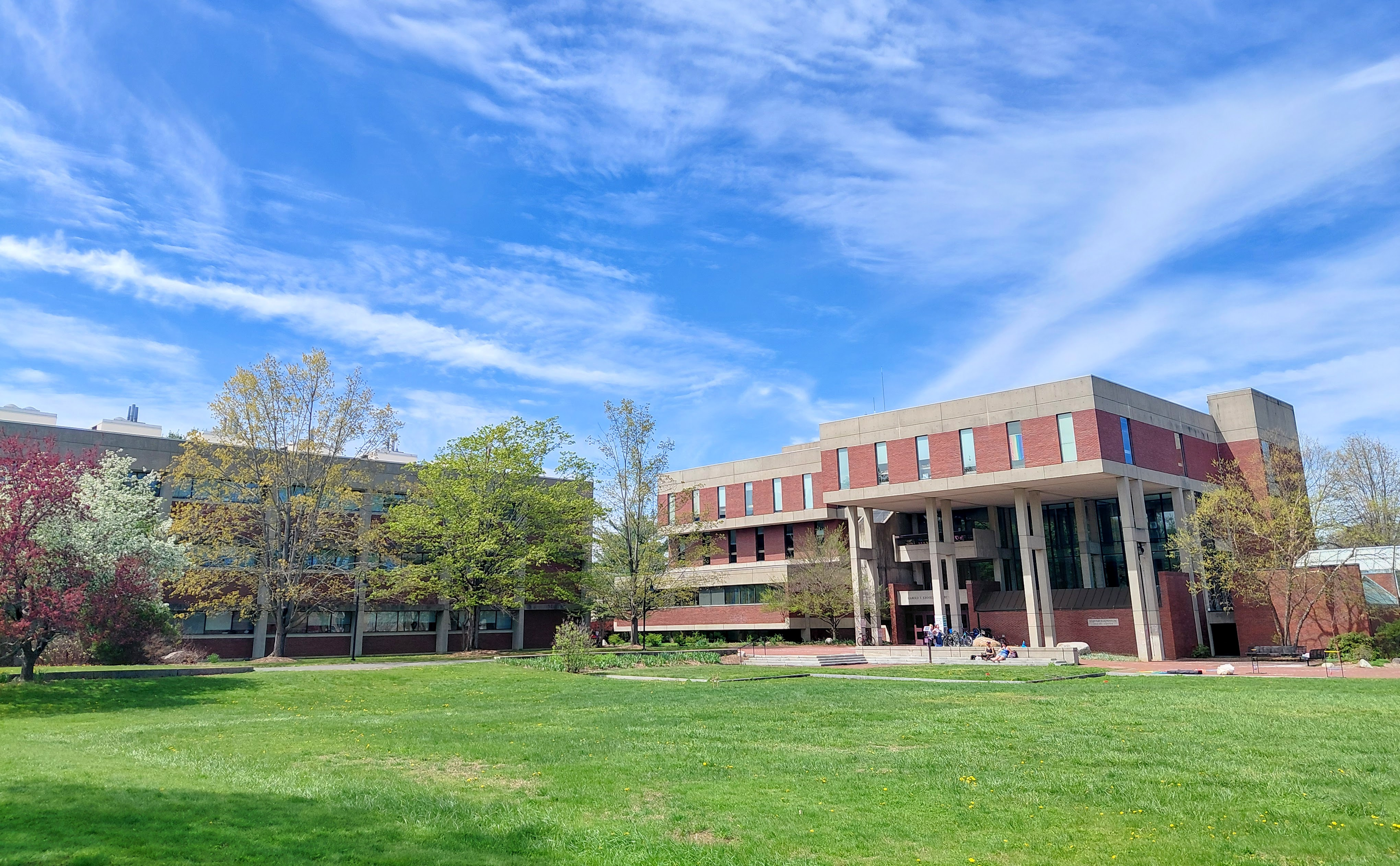
The Library Lawn during spring time

The Five College Program in Peace and World Security Studies (PAWSS) is based at Hampshire; its director is Michael Klare. The national reproductive rights organization Civil Liberties and Public Policy operates on Hampshire's campus, where they host an annual conference. In 2014, Hampshire announced the formation of a new concentration, in Psychoanalytic Studies.

=== Five College Consortium ===
Hampshire College was the youngest of the schools in the Five-College Consortium. The other schools are Amherst College, Mount Holyoke College, Smith College and the University of Massachusetts Amherst.

Students at each of the schools may take classes and borrow books at the other schools, generally without paying additional fees. They may use resources at the other schools, including internet access, and the dining halls. The five colleges collectively offer over 5,300 courses, and the five libraries have over eight million books. The Pioneer Valley Transit Authority operates bus services between the schools and the greater Pioneer Valley area.

There are two joint departments in the five-college consortium: Dance and Astronomy.

=== "Re-Radicalization" student group ===
In the spring of 2004, a student group calling itself Re-Radicalization of Hampshire College (Re-Rad) emerged with a manifesto called "The Re-Making of a College", which critiqued what they saw as a betrayal of Hampshire's founding ideas in alternative education and student-centered learning. On May 3, 2004, the group staged a demonstration that packed the hall outside the President's office during an administrative meeting. Response from the community was generally amicable, and Re-Rad made some progress.

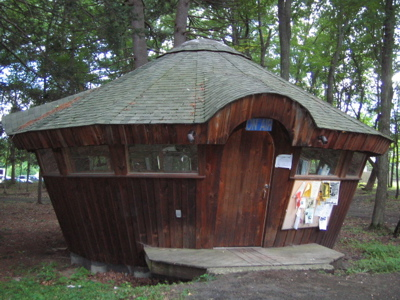
The Yurt is home to Hampshire's student Internet radio station

The Re-Radicalization movement was responding in part to a new "First-Year Plan" that changed the structure of the first year of study. Beginning in the Fall of 2002, the requirements for passing Division I were changed so that first-year students no longer had to complete independent projects (see #Curriculum).

A more detailed account of movements such as these can be found in A Documentary History of Hampshire College, Vol. 4: 1995–2005.

== Sustainability ==
Since 2011, Hampshire College has been involved in various projects to "transform its food systems, campus operations, curriculum and campus culture to embrace sustainability." The college's advances in sustainability include various projects. In 2011, the college was the first in the world to divest from fossil fuels. In 2012, they developed the Climate Action Plan for climate neutrality by 2022. Hampshire College Farm expanded its education and operation, establishing the Center for New England and Agriculture. In 2014, the main traffic circle and parking lot were eliminated and turned into a meadow. They also stopped mowing dozens of acres of lawns in hopes of reducing greenhouse-gas emissions, saving landscaping expenses, and creating wildlife and plant habitats. In the same year, they installed an electric car-charging station behind the library. In 2015, they permanently protected 46 acres of their property through a conservation restriction. The Kern Center became their first 100% emission-free building in 2016, and the Hitchcock Center for the Environment built its new living building on Hampshire land. In 2017, Hampshire College pledged to continue to support climate action and reduce carbon emissions in accordance with the Paris Climate Agreement. They signed the We Are Still In campaign along with 2,600 total signers.

=== The R.W. Kern Center ===
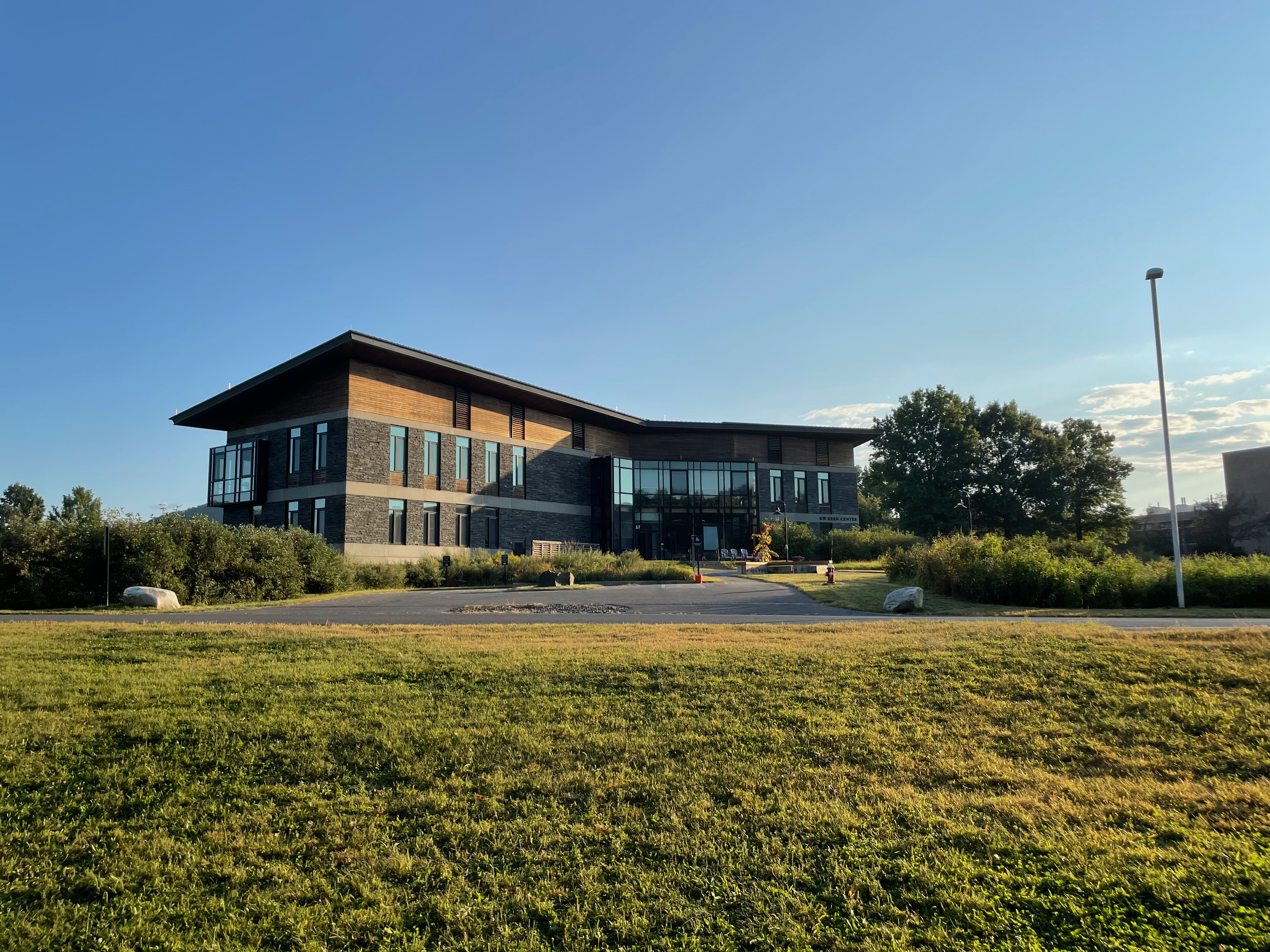
The R.W. Kern Center in 2024

Opened on April 26, 2017, the R.W. Kern Center is the 17th Living Building in the world certified under the advanced green-building standard, the Living Building Challenge. The building cost $10.4 million made possible by private donations. It operates net-zero energy, water, and waste. The building is powered by solar panels on its roof, supplies its own drinking water by harvesting rainwater from its roof, manages its wastewater on site, and contains composting toilets. The Kern Center was built using materials from local sources without the use of any toxic "red list" materials; even materials such as duct tape were chosen carefully to comply with strict environmental standards. Currently, the Kern Center houses Admissions and financial aid offices as well as classrooms, student lounges, and a coffee shop. President Jonathan Lash stated that "[w]ith this building we have sought to reflect our values, in the inclusive design process, the design and materials, our construction practices, and our reporting about the building... [w]hy are buildings constructed any other way? In every way, the Kern Center was built to learn and teach."

=== Climate Action Plan ===
In the next 20 years, the college planned to reduce 50% of its current energy consumption, another major goal stated in its Climate Action Plan. They had planned to renovate the Robert Crown Center, Library, Cole Science Center, Franklin Patterson Hall, Merrill House, and Greenwich House. The plan was made possible by a $1 million gift.

==== Solar power ====
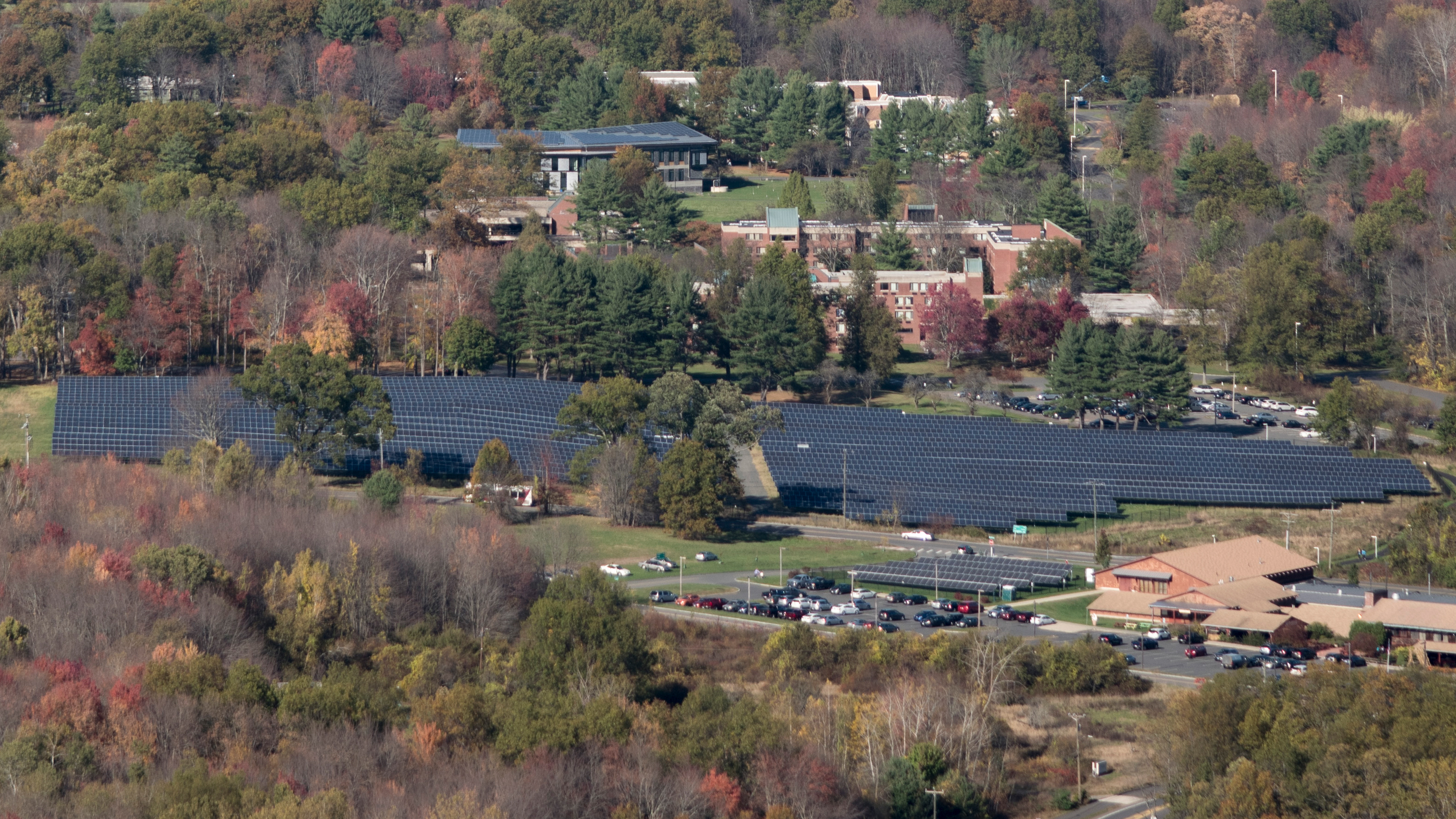
The solar panel field at Hampshire College

Hampshire College planned to become the first residential college in the United States to be 100% solar powered for electricity. The solar panel array is a part of the college's main goal – to be climate-neutral by 2020 according to their extensive Climate Action Plan developed in April 2012. The school purchases solar credits and sells solar energy from its field. They began construction in February 2015. Two witness tests were conducted in June 2017, and the final one was conducted in November 2017. Since June 2017, part of the solar array has been powering the college. The solar panels cover 19 acres, consisting of 15,000 panels, which will eventually produce 4.7 megawatts of power. Hampshire College contracted with SolarCity to install the panels.

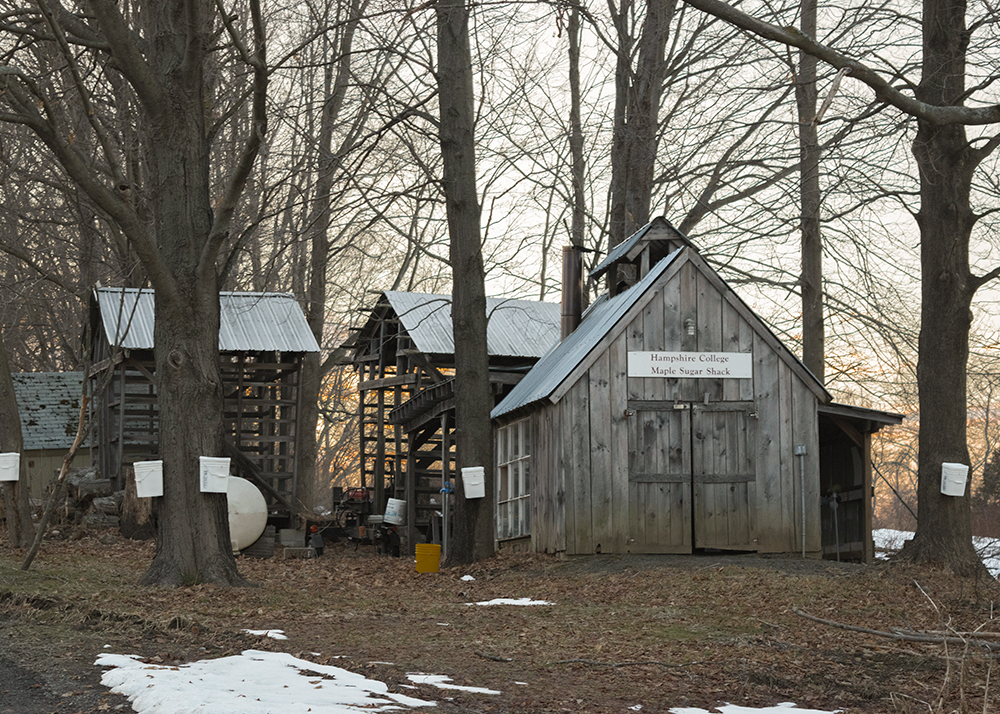
The Maple Sugar Shack

The college announced it will save up to $8 million in electricity costs in 20 years and $400,000 yearly. The 4.7 megawatts of solar power avoids 3,000 metric tons of greenhouse gas emissions per year, equivalent to 650 fewer cars on the road. Other solar sources on campus contribute to the primary solar array's power production: the Kern Center rooftop solar arrays, the CSA Barn, the president's house, and the Longworth Arts Center canopy. The president stated that "[t]his is the challenge that our students and every other student is going to face in the next 20 years, how to turn the US economy into a low-carbon economy ... and they're going to get the real firsthand experience of doing it. So that was reason number one." The president has declared that switching to renewable energy is "just the right thing to do in an era of accelerating climate change." He also noted this project will keep jobs local and avoid pipelines being built through people's communities to get power to our college."

In February 2023, the College announced that it had achieved its 2022 goal of carbon neutrality for all campus emissions, including electricity and natural gas heating.

== Campus issues ==
=== Divestment ===
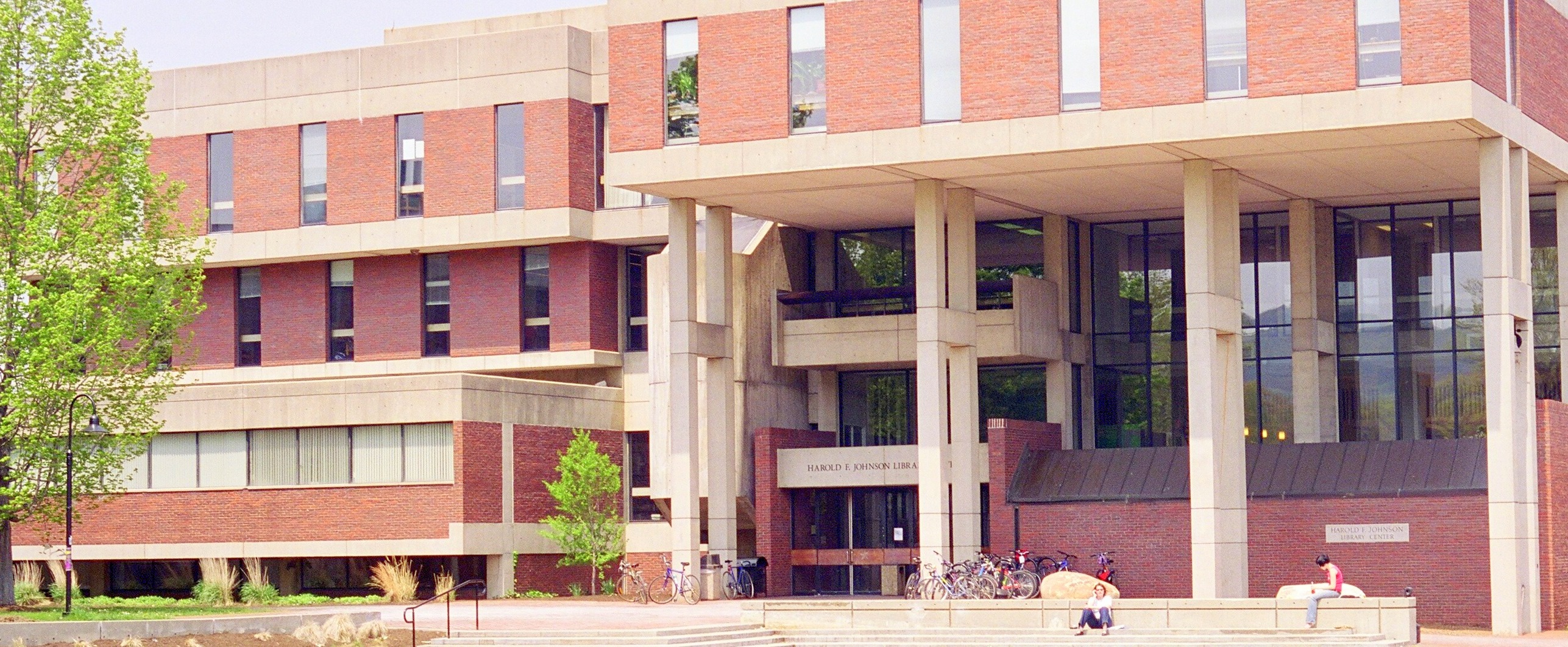
The Harold F. Johnson Library

In May 1977, Hampshire was the first college in the nation to divest from apartheid South Africa. The college removed $39,000 in stocks in four companies (equivalent to $207,000 in 2025).

In February 2009 it was reported that Hampshire College had divested from Israel because it violated human rights. However, under pressure from pro-Israel groups and high-profile individuals, including attorney Alan Dershowitz, the father of a Hampshire alumnus, Hampshire's president stated that the changes in investments were not politically motivated. Hampshire displayed a statement from Dershowitz on its website until at least October 2021, in which the lawyer withdrew his criticism and pledged his support, stating, "Hampshire has now done the right thing. It has made it unequivocally clear that it did not and will not divest from Israel. Indeed, it will continue to hold stock in companies that do business with Israel as well as with Israeli companies...."

=== American flag ===
Following the election of Donald Trump as President of the United States, on November 9, 2016, Hampshire students lowered the American flag at the center of campus to half-staff as "a protest against acts of hate and harassment." The next day, school officials announced they would allow the flag to remain at half-staff temporarily. College president Jonathan Lash said in a statement that some of the people on campus felt that the flag was "a powerful symbol of fear they've felt all their lives because they grew up in marginalized communities, never feeling safe." In an incident under investigation by campus police, the flag was burned at some time in the evening of November 10 or the morning of November 11. It was replaced the following day, and the school indicated it would continue to fly the flag at half-staff "to mourn deaths from violence in the U.S. and around the world." Following a backlash, the college announced on November 21 that it would temporarily cease flying the flag on campus. This, in turn, led to protests including veterans for restoration of the flag, with sources claiming from 400 attendees to "over a thousand." Local state representative John Velis (D) called for the school to return the flag and expel the students who burned the flag: they should "pack up their bags and leave." On November 29, shortly after Fox News aired a news segment on the incident, Trump tweeted "Nobody should be allowed to burn the American flag – if they do, there must be consequences – perhaps loss of citizenship or year in jail!" On December 2, the school decided to raise the flag to full staff.

== In the media ==
In November 2001, a controversial All-Community Vote at Hampshire declared the school opposed to the recently launched war on terrorism after 9/11, another national first that drew national media attention, including scathing reports from Fox News Channel and the New York Post ("Kooky College Condemns War").

Saturday Night Live had a regular sketch, "Jarret's Room", starring Jimmy Fallon, which ostensibly takes place at Hampshire College but is instead a composite of several schools. It refers to non-existent buildings ("McGuinn Hall", which is actually the Sociology and Social Work building at fellow cast member Amy Poehler's alma mater, Boston College). It features yearbooks, tests, seniors, fraternities, three-person dorm rooms, and a football team – none of which the school has ever had. The sketch also claims that the college is actually in New Hampshire rather than Massachusetts. These characters would later be revived on The Tonight Show with Jimmy Fallon during the COVID-19 pandemic. In another SNL episode aired on December 14, 2002, host Al Gore plays Dr. Ralph Wormly Curtis, a professor at Hampshire College. The same sketch implies that the band Phish attends Hampshire as well, though in reality all four members attended the University of Vermont.

In Whit Stillman's comedy-drama film The Last Days of Disco, Chloë Sevigny and Kate Beckinsale star as two recent Hampshire graduates in the early 1980s in the disco scene of New York City.

Alumnus Ken Burns wrote of the college: "Hampshire College is a perfect American place. If we look back at the history of our country, the things we celebrate were outside of the mainstream. Much of the world operated under a tyrannical model, but Americans said, 'We will govern ourselves.' So, too, Hampshire asked, at its founding, the difficult questions of how we might educate ourselves... When I entered Hampshire, I found it to be the most exciting place on earth." Loren Pope wrote of Hampshire in the college guide Colleges That Change Lives: "Today no college has students whose intellectual thyroids are more active or whose minds are more compassionately engaged."

The events around the planned closure of the college that was made unsuccessful by student protests are the subject of the 2022 film The Unmaking of a College.

== Alumni and faculty ==
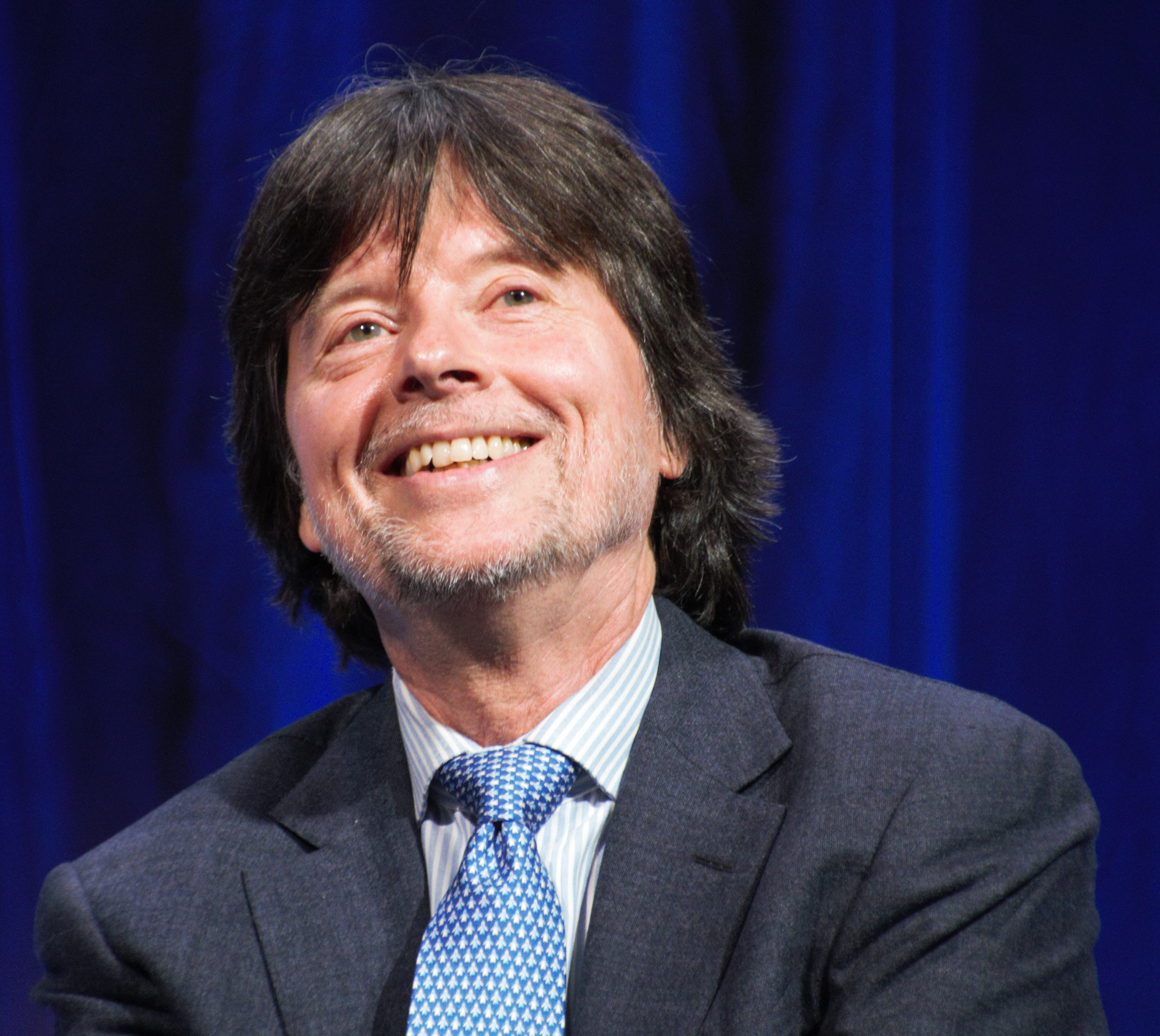
Documentarian Ken Burns

=== Notable alumni ===
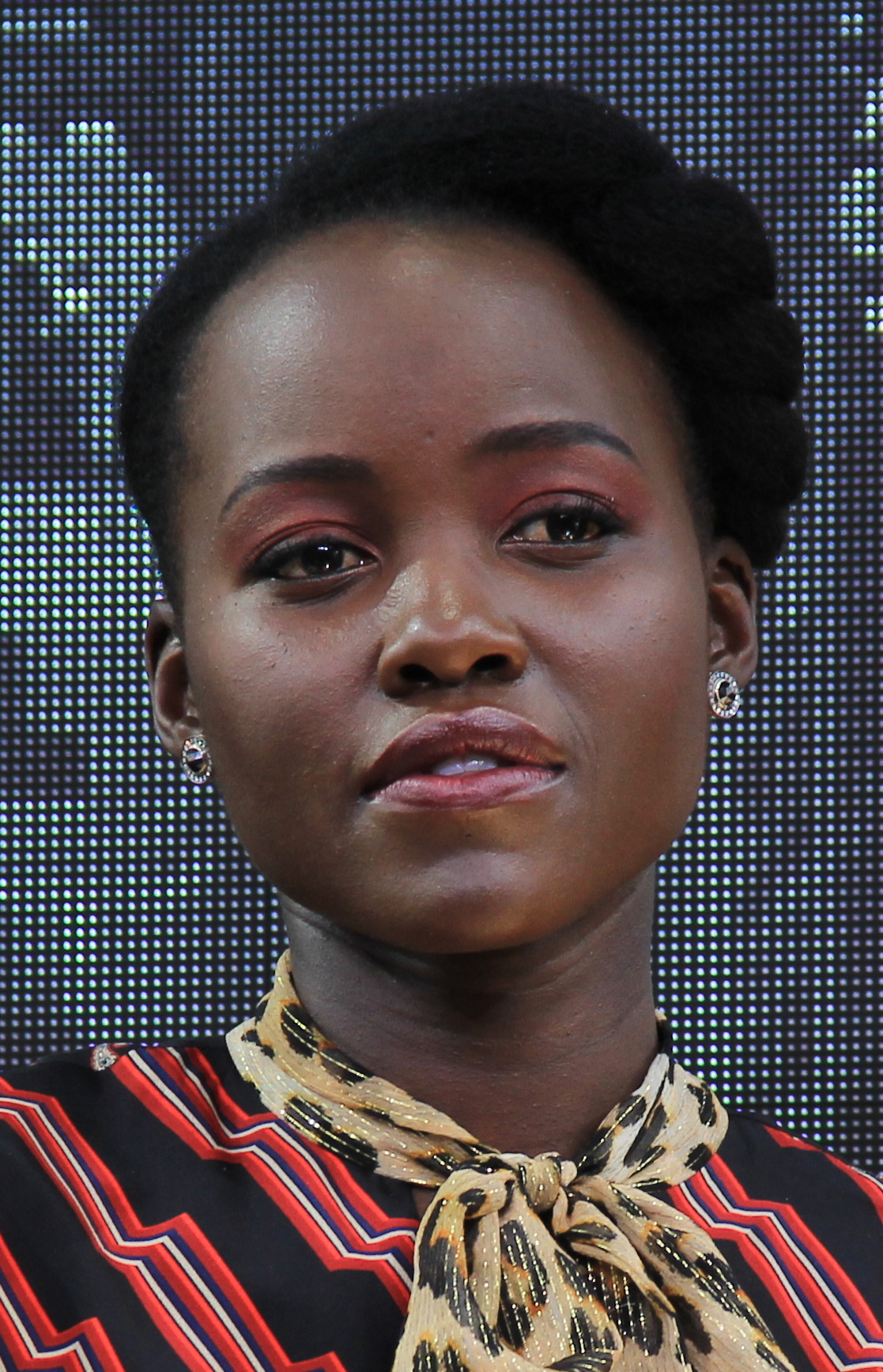
Academy Award-winning actress Lupita Nyong'o

Hampshire College alumni have been recognized with awards including the Pulitzer Prize, Emmy Award, Academy Award, Peabody Award, Grammy Award, and MacArthur Fellowship. Notable alumni include:

- Heather Boushey, economist
- Ken Burns, documentary filmmaker
- Charlie Clouser, composer
- James Crown, billionaire investor
- James Estrin, Pulitzer Prize–winning photographer
- Stephen Gardner, Amtrak CEO
- Tooker Gomberg, politician, activist, filmmaker
- Gary Hirshberg, Stonyfield Farm CEO
- Jeffrey Hollender, Seventh Generation Inc. CEO
- Jon Krakauer, author
- Fred Melamed, actor
- Eugene Mirman, comedian
- Lupita Nyong'o, Academy Award–winning actress
- Oneohtrix Point Never, musician
- Liev Schreiber, actor
- David Shulkin, 9th U.S. secretary of veterans affairs
- Elliott Smith, singer-songwriter
- Barry Sonnenfeld, director

=== Notable former faculty ===
- Eqbal Ahmad (1982–1997), political scientist
- James Baldwin (1983–1986), writer and activist
- Norton Juster (1970–1992), writer and architect, taught architecture and environmental design
- David Kelly (1940–2025), founder and longtime director of Hampshire College Summer Studies in Mathematics for talented high-school students

== See also ==
- Tofu Curtain – Cultural or socioeconomic divide in Western Massachusetts
