= Association of Independent Colleges and Universities in Massachusetts =

The Association of Independent Colleges and Universities in Massachusetts (AICUM) is a grouping of accredited, independent, private colleges and universities in the state of Massachusetts. The Association advocates in public policy forums on behalf of its member institutions.

AICUM is headquartered in Boston, Massachusetts, and it was established by a panel of university presidents. Its current president is Richard Doherty. AICUM is a member of the Coalition for College Cost Savings and the National Association of Independent Colleges and Universities
