= Law enforcement in the United States =

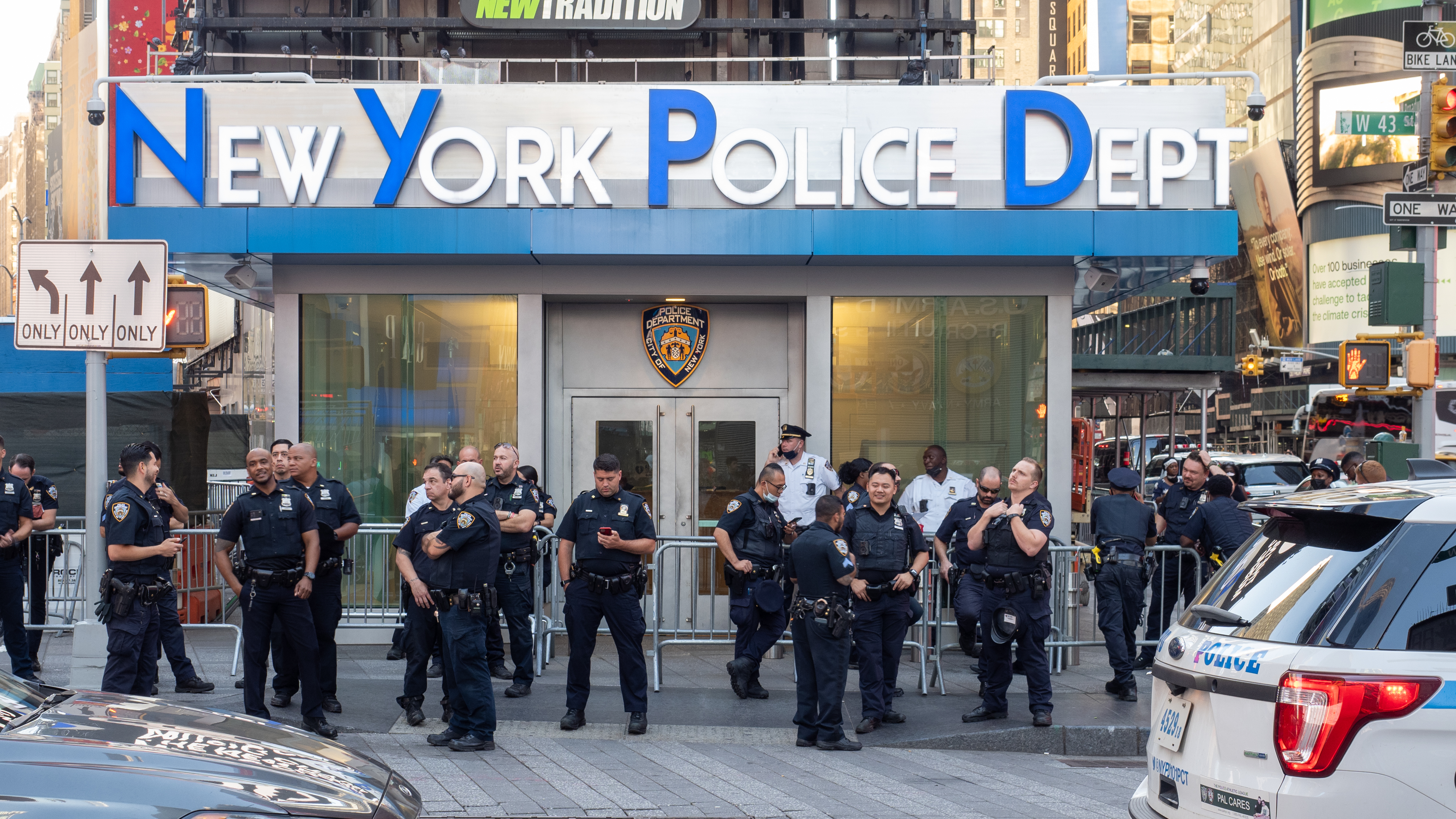
New York City Police Department officers outside a police station in Times Square, 2021. The NYPD is the largest municipal police in the U.S. and the world

Law enforcement in the United States operates primarily through governmental police agencies. There are 17,985 police agencies in the United States which include municipal/local police departments, county police or sheriff's offices/departments, state police and highway patrol, and federal law enforcement agencies. The law enforcement purposes of these agencies are the investigation of suspected criminal activity, referral of the results of investigations to state or federal prosecutors, and the temporary detention of suspected criminals pending judicial action. Law enforcement agencies are also commonly charged with the responsibilities of deterring criminal activity and preventing the successful commission of crimes in progress. Other duties may include the service and enforcement of warrants, writs, and other orders of the courts.

In the United States, police are considered an emergency service involved in providing first response to emergencies and other threats to public safety; the protection of certain public facilities and infrastructure, such as private property; the maintenance of public order; the protection of public officials; and the operation of some detention facilities (usually at the local level).

As of 2023, more than 600,000 sworn law enforcement officers are serving in the United States. About 137,000 of those officers work for federal law enforcement agencies.

== Types of law enforcement agencies ==
Policing in the United States is conducted by "around 18,000 federal, state, county, and municipal law enforcement agencies, all with their own rules". Every state has its own nomenclature for agencies, and their powers, responsibilities and funding vary from state to state. 2008 census data from the Department of Justice's Bureau of Justice Statistics (BJS) revealed that this constitutes:

- federal law enforcement agencies
- state troopers
  - state police and highway patrol
  - state highway patrol and state patrol
- county police or sheriff's offices/departments
- municipal/local police departments

=== Federal ===
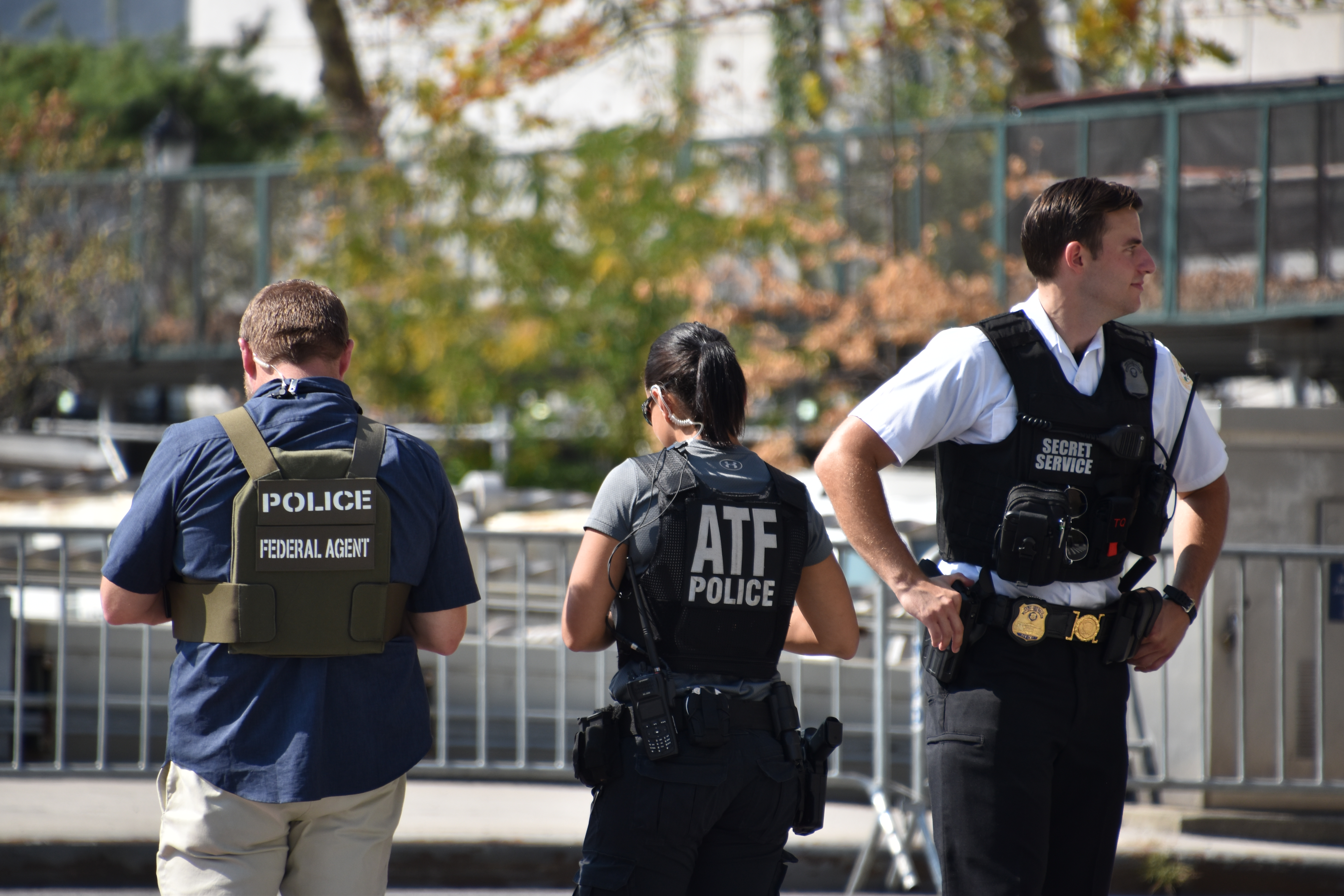
Federal agents of the Diplomatic Security Service, ATF, and Secret Service coordinating security for United Nations General Assembly delegates in 2019

At the federal level, there exists both federal agents, which possess full federal authority as given to them under United States Code (U.S.C.), and federal law enforcement agencies, who are authorized to enforce various laws at the federal level. Both police and law enforcement agencies operate at the highest level and are endowed with police roles; each may maintain a small component of the other (for example, the FBI Police). The agencies have jurisdiction in all states, U.S. territories, and U.S. possessions for enforcement of federal law. Most federal agencies are limited by the U.S. Code to investigating only matters that are explicitly within the power of the federal government. However, federal investigative powers have become very broad in practice, especially since the passage of the Patriot Act. There are also federal law enforcement agencies, such as the National Park Service Law Enforcement Rangers, that are granted state arrest authority off primary federal jurisdiction.

The Department of Justice (DOJ) is responsible for most law enforcement duties at the federal level. It includes the Federal Bureau of Investigation (FBI), the Drug Enforcement Administration (DEA), the Bureau of Alcohol, Tobacco, Firearms, and Explosives (ATF), the United States Marshals Service, and the Federal Bureau of Prisons (BOP).

The Department of Homeland Security (DHS) is another branch with numerous federal law enforcement agencies reporting to it. The United States Border Patrol (USBP), U.S. Immigration and Customs Enforcement (ICE), United States Secret Service (USSS), United States Coast Guard (USCG), and the Transportation Security Administration (TSA) are some of the agencies that report to the DHS.

At a crime or disaster scene affecting large numbers of people, multiple jurisdictions, or broad geographic areas, many police agencies may be involved by mutual aid agreements. For example, the United States Federal Protective Service responded to the Hurricane Katrina natural disaster. The command in such situations remains a complex and flexible issue.

In accordance with the federal structure of the United States government, the national (federal) government is not authorized to execute general police powers by the Constitution of the United States. The power to have a police force is given to each of the United States' 50 federated states. The Constitution gives the federal government the power to deal with foreign affairs and interstate affairs (affairs between the states). For police, this means that if a non-federal crime is committed in a U.S. state and the fugitive does not flee the state, the federal government has no jurisdiction. However, once the fugitive crosses a state line, he violates the federal law of interstate flight and is subject to federal jurisdiction, at which time federal law enforcement agencies may become involved.

==== Security-oriented agencies ====
Certain federal law enforcement agencies operate primarily as security forces for their parent agency's properties and buildings by providing access control, emergency response, site security, and protection for sensitive facilities. These law enforcement officers have a more limited scope of responsibility and generally have a jurisdiction limited to federal property and its surrounding area.

Examples

- United States Federal Protective Service
- United States Secret Service Uniformed Division
- United States Capitol Police
- Supreme Court of the United States Police Department
- FBI Police
- United States Treasury Police
- United States Mint Police
- Federal Reserve Police
- Central Intelligence Agency Security Protective Officers
- National Security Agency Police
- NASA Office of Protective Services (NASA OPS)

==== Gendarmerie ====
The American equivalent of Gendarmerie (a military force tasked with law enforcement) is the United States Coast Guard. The Coast Guard is the maritime law enforcement agency part of the United States Armed Forces and is exempt from the Posse Comitatus Act (a U.S. law banning the Armed Forces from engaging in law enforcement operations). Additionally when National Guard forces are under state control they are exempt from the Posse Comitatus Act.

=== State ===
Most states operate statewide law enforcement agencies that provide law enforcement duties, including investigations and state patrols. They may be called state police and highway patrol (state troopers), and are normally part of the state Department of public safety. In addition, the Attorney General's office of each state has its own state bureau of investigation, such as in California with the California Department of Justice. The Texas Ranger Division fulfills this role in Texas, although they were founded in the period before Texas became a state.

Various departments of state governments may have their own enforcement divisions, such as state capitol police, commercial vehicle enforcement, campus police, water police, environmental (fish and game/wildlife) conservation officers, or game wardens (with full police powers and statewide jurisdiction). For example, in Colorado, the Department of Revenue has its own investigative branch.

=== County ===
Also known as parishes and boroughs, county law enforcement is provided by sheriffs' departments or offices and county police departments.

==== County police ====
County police tend to exist only in metropolitan counties and have countywide jurisdiction. For places that have both county police and county sheriff, responsibilities are given to each: the county police are in charge of typical police duties such as patrol and investigations, whereas the sheriffs' department in this situation takes care of serving papers and providing security to the courts. County police tend to fall into three broad categories, full service, limited service, and restrictive service. Full service provides full police services to the entire county. Limited service provides to the unincorporated and special districts. Restricted service provide security to the county-owned parts of the county.

==== Sheriffs' offices ====
Sheriffs are law enforcement officers who have many different responsibilities and functions from state to state. Sheriffs are elected officials who are appointed or hired in. Sheriffs are responsible for all three parts of the criminal justice system. They uphold the county jail, ensure safety within the courts, and may have jurisdiction to enforce laws in the entire county. They have more responsibilities such as transporting prisoners, running crime labs, and collecting taxes.

In Texas, the sheriff's office is normally the agency responsible for handling mental health calls. If the situation is dangerous, a sheriff's deputy has the power to take a person to a hospital on a mental health commitment immediately. However, if the situation is not actively dangerous, a warrant must be sought. With the rise in mental health units across the state, the Texas CIT Association was formed.

==== Commonwealth of Virginia ====
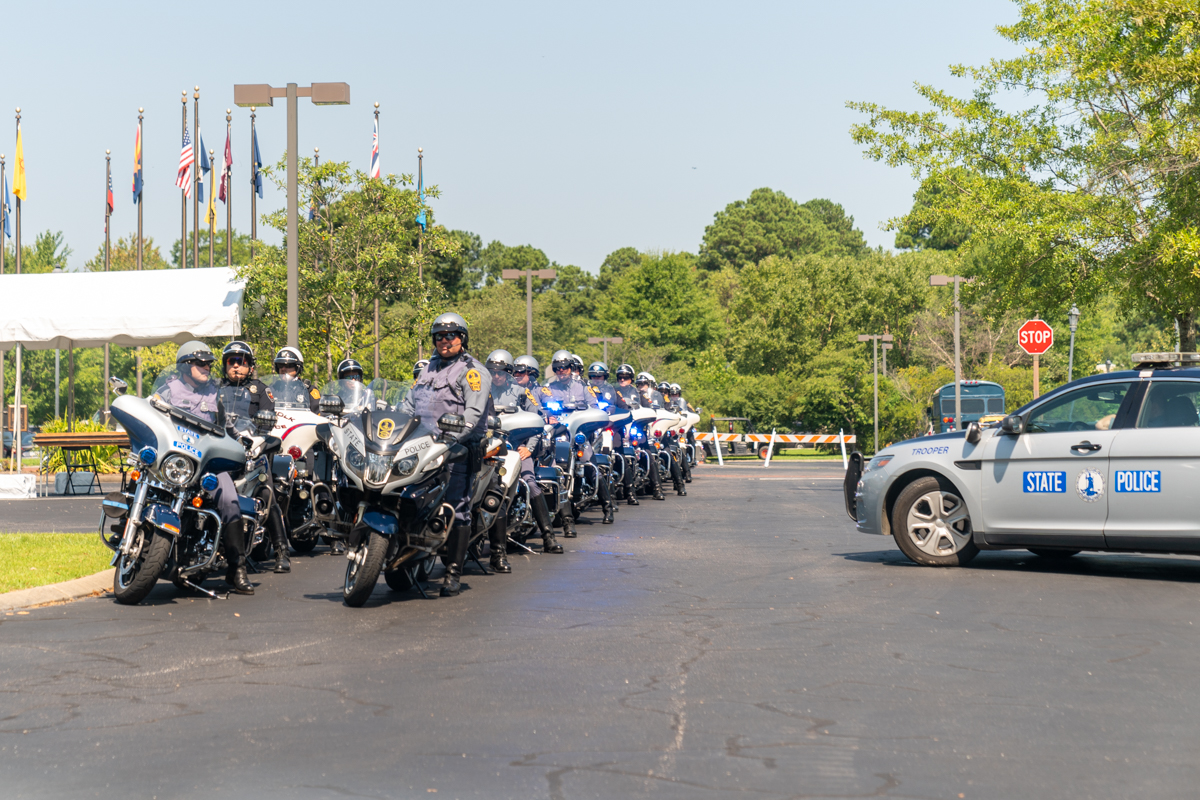
Virginia State Police troopers alongside local police officers in Williamsburg, Virginia

The Commonwealth of Virginia does not have overlapping county and city jurisdictions, whereas in most other states, municipalities generally fall within (and share jurisdiction and many other governmental responsibilities with) one (or more) county(ies). In Virginia, governmental power flows down from the state (or in Virginia's case, commonwealth) directly to either a county or an independent city. Thus, policing in Virginia is more streamlined: the county sheriff's office/department or county police department does not overlap with an independent city police department. Unincorporated townships remain part of their parent county, but incorporated townships may have town police departments to augment their county law enforcement. Town police departments are often small and may deploy a combination of paid and unpaid, full and part-time law enforcement officers, including auxiliary officers who typically serve as part-time, unpaid volunteers. If present, independent city sheriff's offices usually follow the restrictive model shown above for sheriff's departments, with limited law enforcement authority including warrant service, jail bailiff, etc. Mutual assistance compacts may exist where neighboring law enforcement agencies will assist each other, however, in addition to state (commonwealth) law enforcement resources. Like most states, Virginia also has campus police officers. Under Virginia State Code 23.1-809 and 23.1-810, public and private colleges and universities can maintain their own armed police force and employ sworn campus police officers. These sworn officers have the same authority as local police and are required to complete police academy training mandated by the Virginia Department of Criminal Justice Services. Virginia campus police officers have jurisdiction on and immediately around the campus, but police departments may petition to the local circuit court for concurrent jurisdiction with the local police.

=== Municipal ===
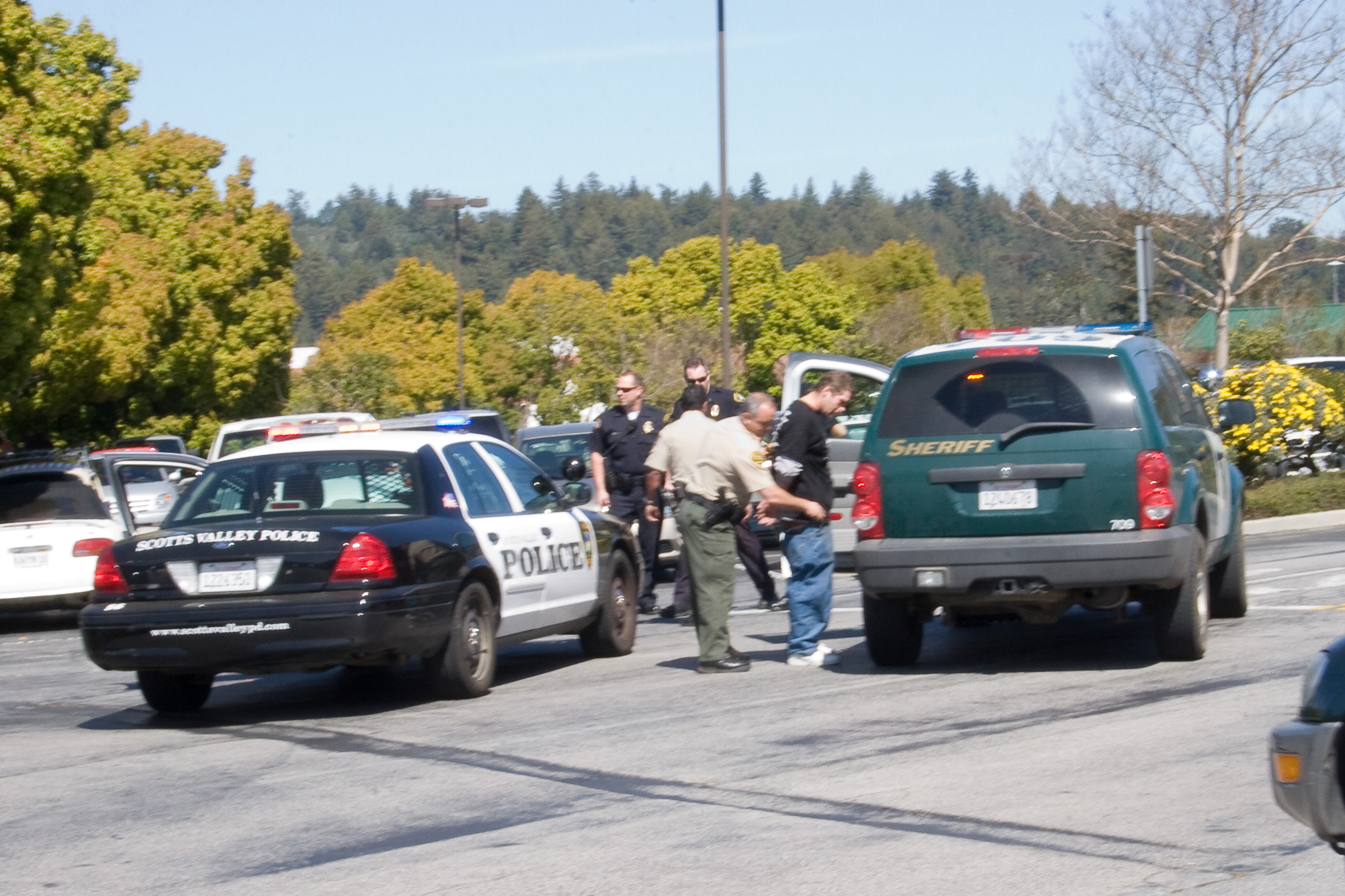
Police officers and sheriff's deputies in Scotts Valley, California arresting a suspect following a police pursuit in 2009

Municipal police range from one-officer agencies (sometimes still called "city police", "town police", and "village police") to the 40,000 person-strong New York City Police Department, which has its own counterterrorism division. Most city agencies take the form (Municipality Name) Los Angeles Police Department. Most municipalities have their own local police departments.

Metropolitan departments, such as the Las Vegas Metropolitan Police Department and Metropolitan Police Department of the District of Columbia, have jurisdiction covering multiple communities and municipalities, often over a wide area, and typically share geographical boundaries within one or more cities or counties. Metropolitan departments have usually been formed by a merger between local agencies, typically several local police departments and often the local sheriff's department or office, in efforts to provide greater efficiency by centralizing command and resources and to resolve jurisdictional problems, often in communities experiencing rapid population growth and urban sprawl, or in neighboring communities too small to afford individual police departments. Some county sheriff's departments, such as the Los Angeles County Sheriff's Department, are contracted to provide full police services to local cities within their counties. Likewise, in Florida, the Duval County Road Patrol and the Jacksonville Police Department consolidated in 1968 to form the "Office of the Sheriff – Jacksonville Police," commonly known as the Jacksonville Sheriff's Office, policing all of Duval County.

=== Puerto Rico Police ===
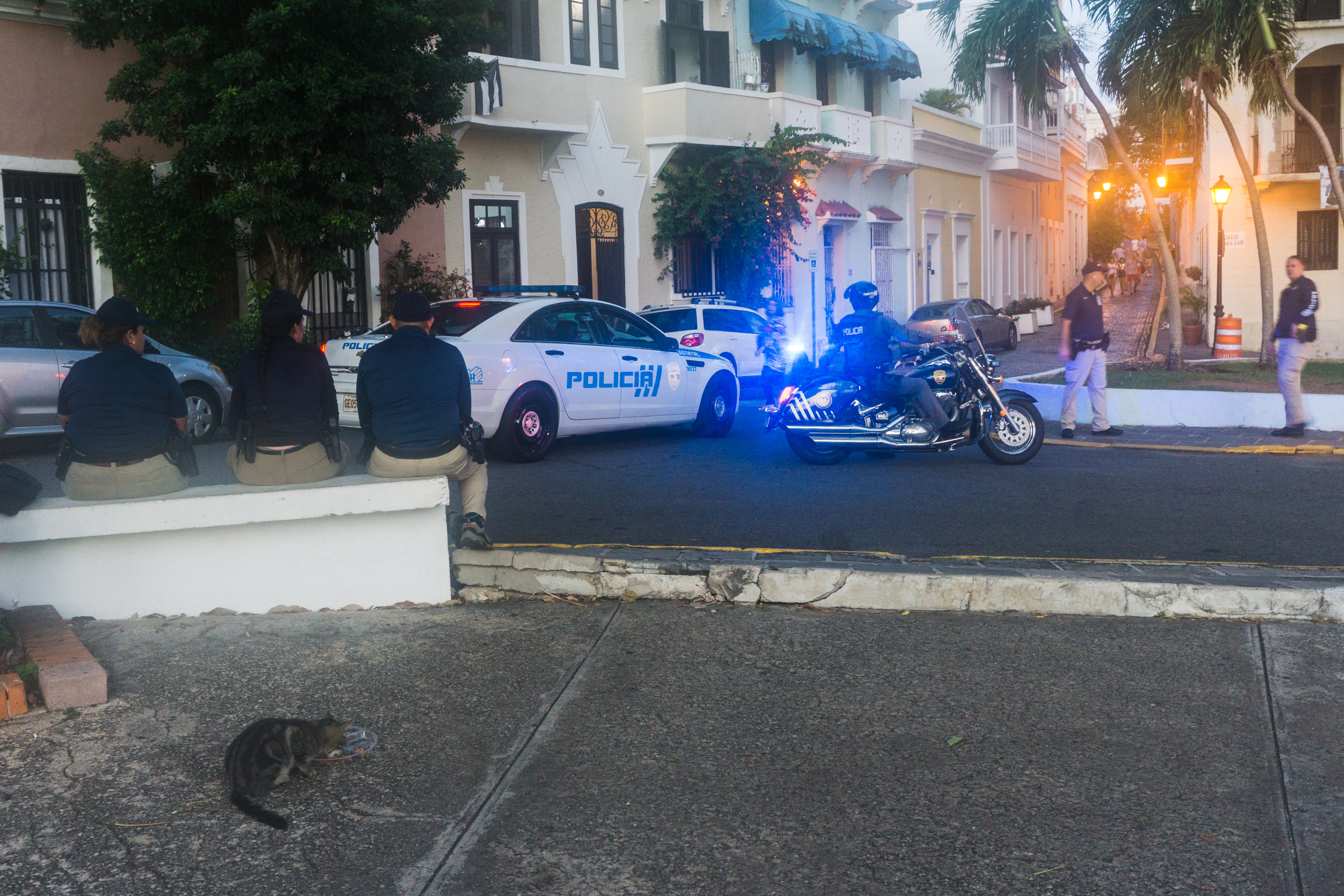
PRPB officers in San Juan, Puerto Rico

The Puerto Rico Police Bureau (PRPB) traces back to 1837, when Spanish governor Francisco Javier de Moreda y Prieto created La Guardia Civil de Puerto Rico (Puerto Rico Civil Guard) to protect the lives and property of Puerto Ricans who at the time were Spanish subjects, and provide police services to the entire island, even though many municipalities maintained their own police force. The United States invaded and took possession of Puerto Rico in July 1898 as a result of the Spanish–American War and has controlled the island as a US territory since then. The Insular Police of Puerto Rico was created on February 21, 1899, under the command of Colonel Frank Thacher (U.S. Marine officer during the Spanish–American War), with an authorized strength of 313 sworn officers. As of 2009, the PRPB had over 17,292 officers.

=== Private police force or department ===
Some law enforcement agencies may be owned, operated, or otherwise controlled by a private entity (such as a corporation) or is a police agency whose primary function is to provide contract based security services to private entities, and may be considered private police. For example, in Washington, D.C., special police officers from the Metro Special Police Department have full law enforcement authority and contract their services to private organizations.

Private police officers are different from security guards, who generally do not have arrest powers beyond a citizen's arrest if they have probable cause to do so. Private police officers are generally required to be licensed the same as a regular police officer and have the same powers as a regular law enforcement officer (even if sometimes limited to the properties they are assigned to protect).

A specific type of private police is company police, such as railroad police. In some cases, private police are sworn in as government employees to ensure compliance with the law, as in the Kalamazoo, Michigan-Charles Services contract, which lasted 3 1/2 years. Private police services are sometimes called "Subscription-Based Patrol." The largest private police forces in the United States are the railroad police employed by the major Class I railroads.

=== Bi-state police ===
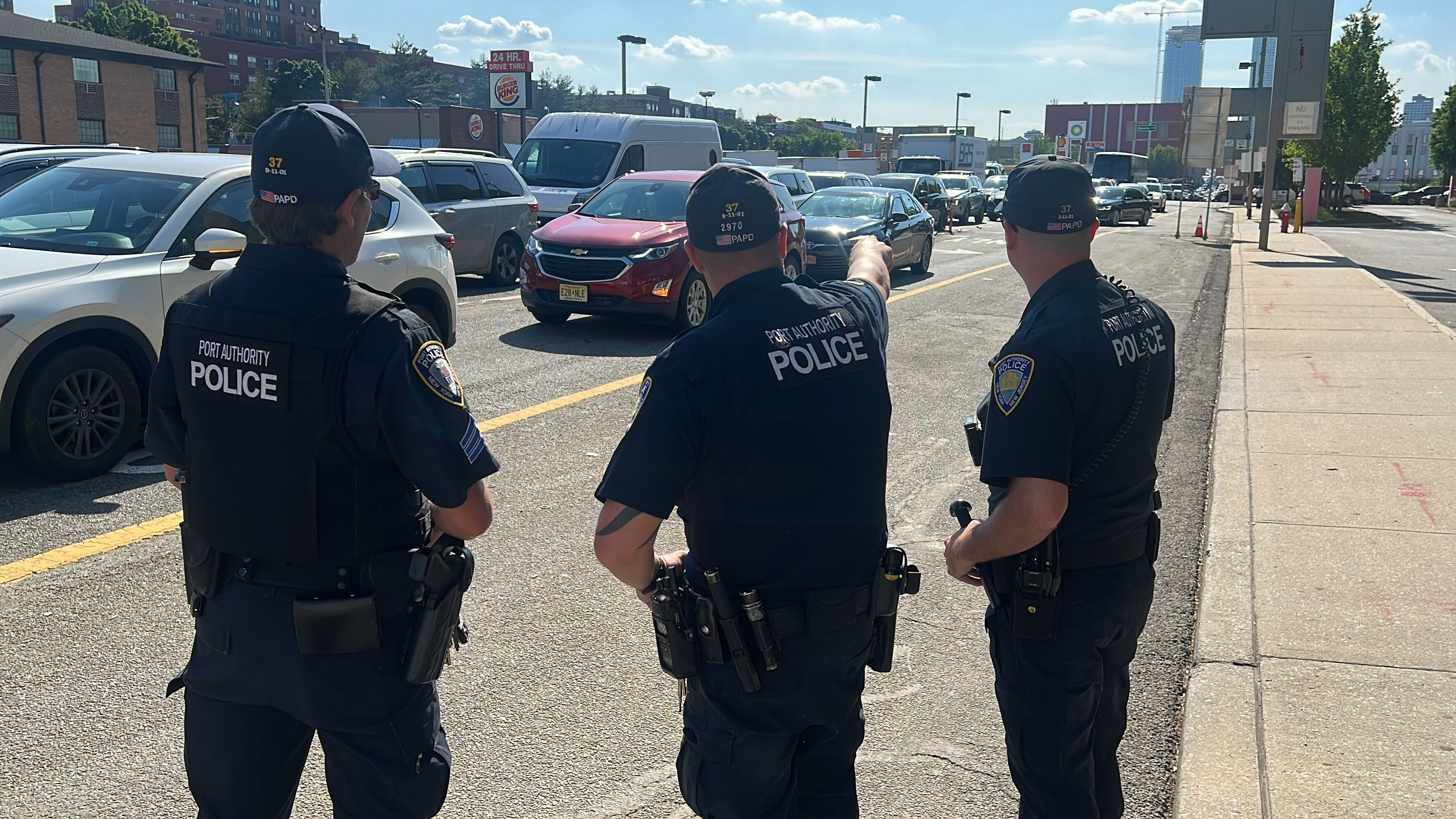
Port Authority of New York and New Jersey Police Department officers watching traffic. This police department has jurisdiction over the Port of New York and New Jersey.

Some police departments have jurisdiction in multiple states, typically two. These agencies are commonly referred to as a bi-state agency. They are state-level agencies that carry full police powers in both states.

These departments have been formed through interstate compact commissions and state-local laws. The US Supreme Court held that states could delegate police power to interstate compact commissions.

Officers of these agencies have full law enforcement powers and responsibilities in each state they operate in. This includes the power to arrest, enforce laws, conduct investigations, run traffic, write traffic citations, respond to emergencies, form mutual aid agreements, assist other agencies, testify in court, and more. Officers are bound to the laws of the jurisdiction(state) that they are currently in.

Railroad police departments are granted this privilege without interstate compacts thanks to various federal and state laws.

Some bi-state police departments include:

- Port Authority of New York and New Jersey Police Department (New York and New Jersey)
- Metro Transit Police Department (District of Columbia, Maryland, and Virginia)
- Delaware River Port Authority Police Department(Pennsylvania and New Jersey)
- Delaware River and Bay Authority Police Department (Delaware and New Jersey)
- Metropolitan Transportation Authority Police Department (New York and Connecticut)
- Delmar Police Department(Delaware and Maryland)
- Colorado City/Hildale City Police Department (Arizona and Utah)
- Ardmore Police Department (Alabama and Tennessee)
- Union City Police Department (Indiana and Ohio)
- Texhoma Police Department (Texas and Oklahoma)
- TSCRA Special Rangers (Texas and Oklahoma)

Mutual aid agreements often give officers/departments from "State A" limited police powers in "State B" & vice versa, even though they aren't certified in both states like bi-state police departments. Twin city departments such as Lookout Mountain, Georgia and Lookout Mountain, Tennessee are examples of this.

== Police functions ==
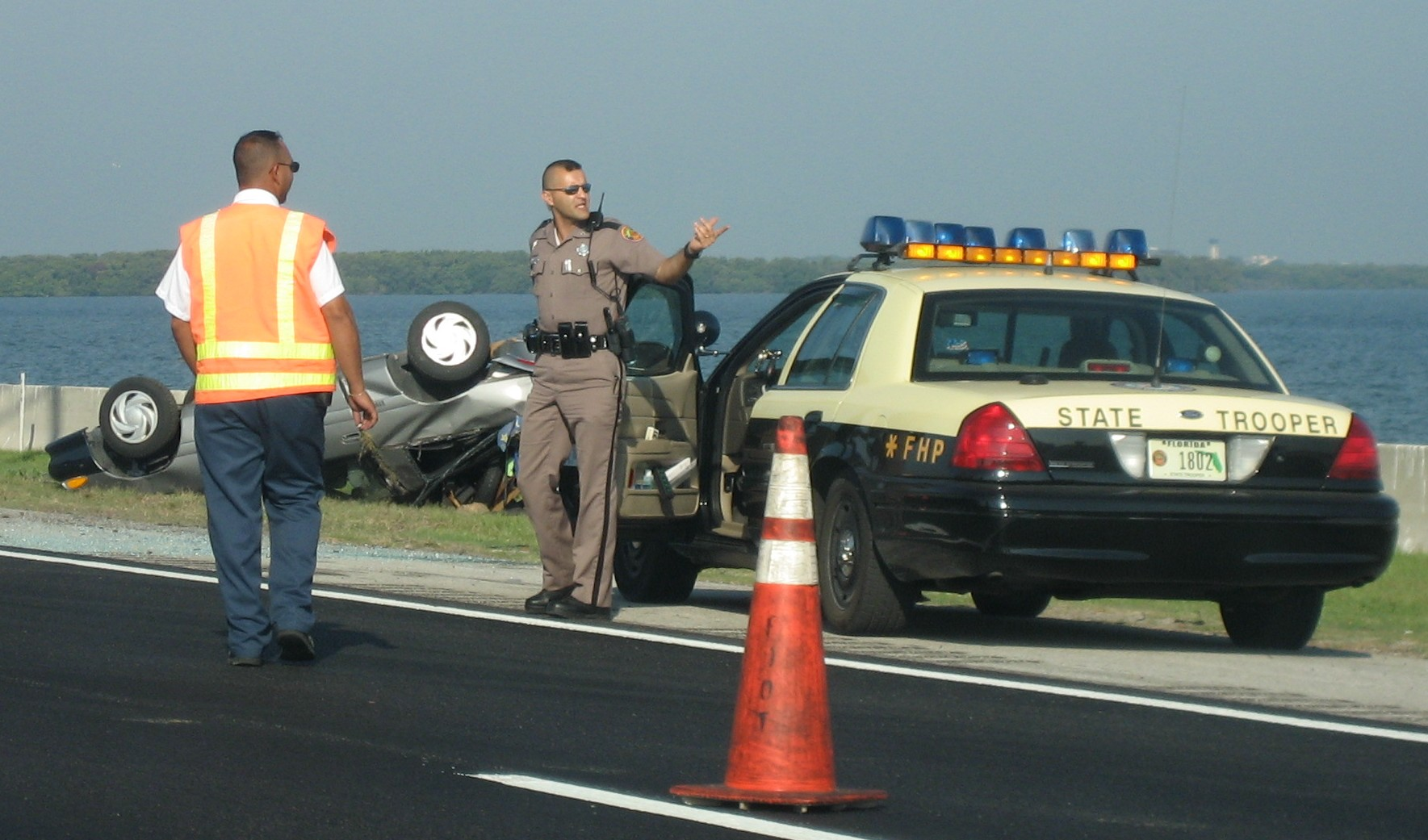
A Florida Highway Patrol trooper and a government worker at the scene of a traffic collision

Textbooks and scholars have identified three primary police agency functions. The following is cited from The American System of Criminal Justice, by George F. Cole and Christopher E. Smith, 2004, 10th edition, Wadsworth/Thomson Learning:

Order maintenance
This is the broad mandate to keep the peace or otherwise prevent behaviors which might disturb others. This can deal with things ranging from a barking dog to a fist-fight. By way of description, Cole and Smith note that police are usually called-on to "handle" these situations with discretion, rather than deal with them as strict violations of law, though of course their authority to deal with these situations is based in violations of law.

Law enforcement
These powers are typically used only in cases where the law has been violated and a suspect must be identified and apprehended. Most obvious instances include robbery, murder, or burglary. This is the popular notion of the main police function, but the frequency of such activity depends on geography and season.

Service
Services may include rendering first aid, providing tourist information, guiding the disoriented, or acting as educators (on topics such as preventing drug use). Cole and Smith cited one study which showed 80% of all calls for police assistance did not involve crimes, but this may not be the case in all parts of the country. Because police agencies are traditionally available year-round, 24 hours a day, citizens call upon police departments not only in times of trouble but also when just inconvenienced. As a result, police services may include roadside auto assistance, providing referrals to other agencies, finding lost pets or property, or checking locks on vacationers' homes.

=== Styles of policing ===
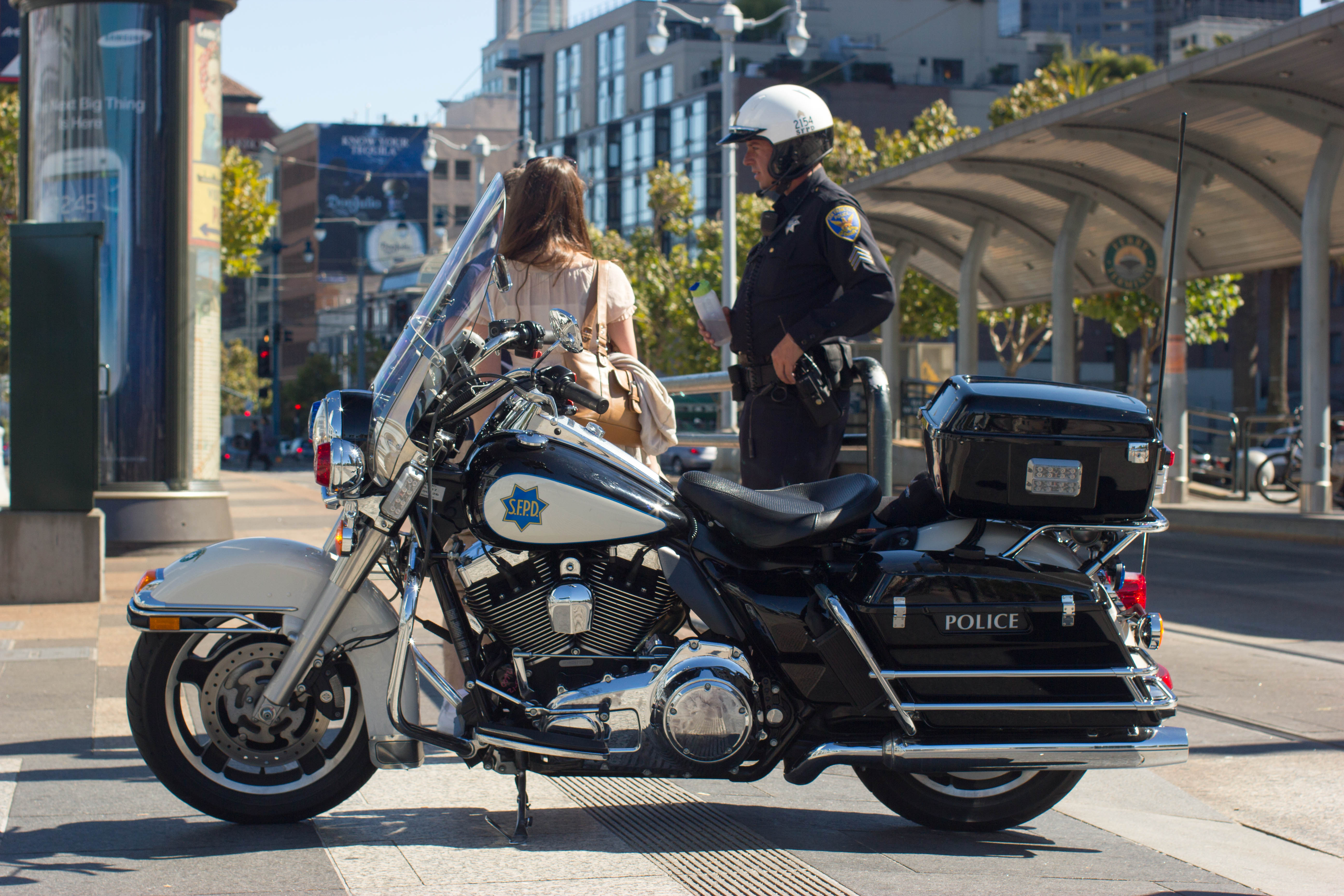
A San Francisco Police Department motorcycle officer speaking to a civilian

Given the broad mandates of police work and the limited resources they have, police administrators must develop policies to prioritize and focus their activities. Some of the more controversial policies restrict, or even forbid, high-speed vehicular pursuits. Researchers Falcone, Wells, & Weisheit describe a historical separation of police models between small towns and larger cities. The distinction has also been defined between rural and urban policing models, which tended to function differently with separate hierarchical systems supporting each.

Three styles of policing develop from a jurisdiction's socioeconomic characteristics, government organization, and choice of police administrators. According to a study in a book by James Q. Wilson (Varieties of Police Behavior, 1968, 1978, Harvard University Press), there were three distinct types of policing developed in his study of eight communities. Each style emphasized different police functions and was linked to specific characteristics of the community the department served.

Watchman
Emphasizes maintaining order, usually found in communities with a declining industrial base, and a blue-collar, mixed ethnic/racial population. This form of policing is implicitly less pro-active than other styles, and certain offenses may be "overlooked" on a variety of social, legal, and cultural grounds as long as public order is maintained. Cole and Smith comment the broad discretion exercised in this style of policing can result in charges of discrimination when it appears police treatment of different groups results in the perception that some groups get better treatment than others.

Legalistic
Emphasizes law enforcement and professionalism. This is usually found in reform-minded cities, with mixed socioeconomic composition. Officers are expected to generate a large number of arrests and citations and act as if there were a single community standard for conduct, rather than different standards for different groups. However, the fact that certain groups are more likely to have law enforcement contact means this strict enforcement of laws may seem overly harsh on certain groups.

Service
Emphasizes the service functions of police work, usually found in suburban, middle-class communities where residents demand individual treatment. Police in homogeneous communities can view their work as protecting their citizens against "outsiders", with frequent but often informal interventions against community members. The uniform make-up of the community means crimes are usually more obvious, and therefore less frequent, leaving police free to deal with service functions and traffic control.

Wilson's study applies to police behavior for the entire department over time. At any given time, police officers may be acting in a watchman, service, or legalistic function by the nature of what they are doing at the time, their temperament, or their mood at the time. Individual officers may also be inclined to one style or another, regardless of the supervisor or citizen demands.

Community policing is a shift in policing practices in the U.S. that moved away from standardization and towards a more preventive model where police actively partner with the community it serves.

== History ==
=== Early colonial policing ===
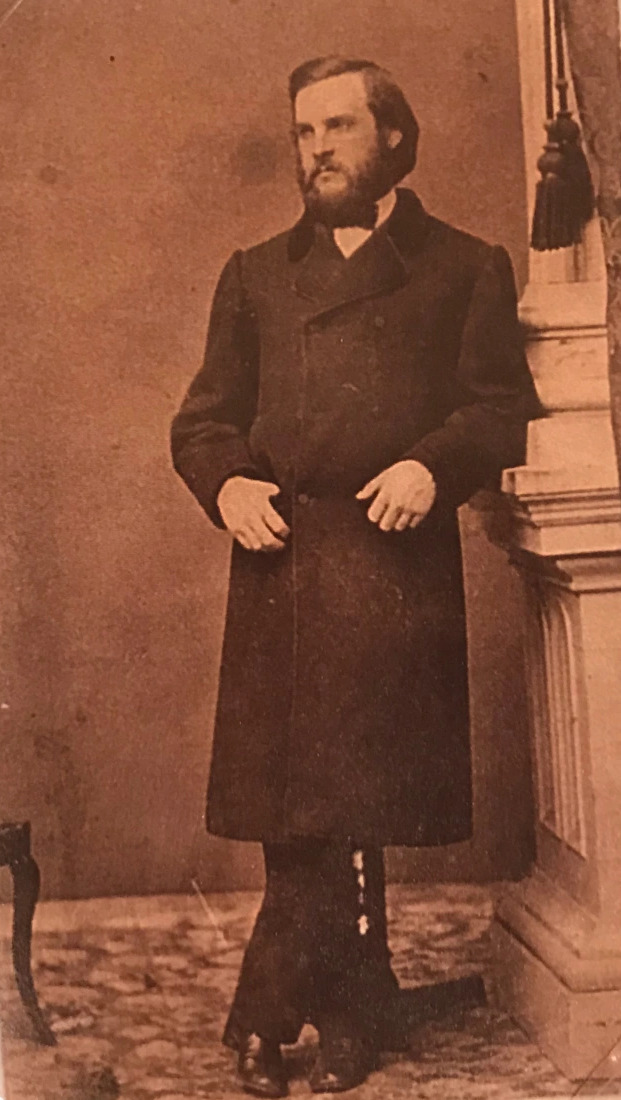
Grover Cleveland, sheriff of Erie County, New York from 1871 to 1872

Policing in what would become the United States of America arose from the law enforcement systems in European countries, particularly the ancient English common law system. This relied heavily on citizen volunteers, as well as watch groups, constables, sheriffs, and a conscription system known as posse comitatus similar to the militia system.

An early night watch formed in Boston in 1631, and in 1634 the first U.S. constable on record was Joshua Pratt, in the Plymouth Colony. Constables were tasked with surveying land, serving warrants, and enforcing punishments.

A rattlewatch was formed in New Amsterdam, later to become New York City, in 1651. The New York rattlewatch "strolled the streets to discourage crime and search for lawbreakers" and also served as town criers. In 1658, they began drawing pay, making them the first municipally funded police organization. When the English captured New Amsterdam in 1664, they installed a constable whose duties included keeping the peace, suppressing excessive drinking, gambling, prostitution, and preventing disturbances during church services. A night watch was formed in Philadelphia in 1700.

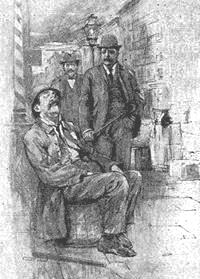
Theodore Roosevelt as New York City Police Commissioner with Jacob Riis in 1894

In the Southern Colonies, formal slave patrols were created as early as 1704 in the Carolinas to prevent slave rebellions and enslaved people from escaping. By 1785 the Charleston Guard and Watch had "a distinct chain of command, uniforms, sole responsibility for policing, salary, authorized use of force, and a focus on preventing 'crime'."

=== Development of modern policing ===
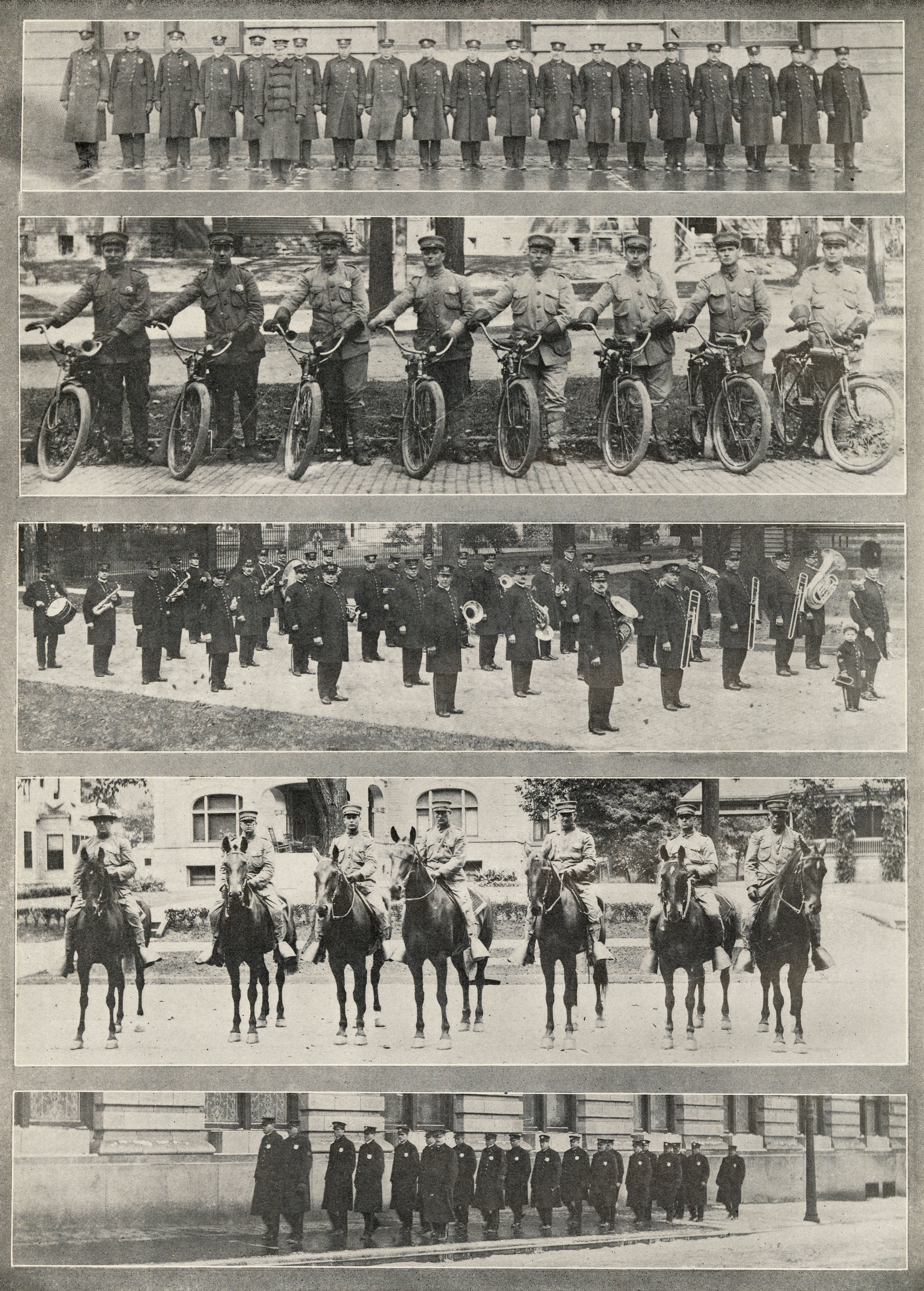
Police in different roles from Toledo, Ohio as seen in 1912 from "Bramble's views Toledo, Ohio : diamond anniversary 1837–1912"

Modern policing began to emerge in the U.S. in the mid-nineteenth century, influenced by the British model of policing established in 1829 based on the Peelian principles. The first organized, publicly funded professional full-time police services were established in Boston in 1838, New York in 1844, Salt Lake City in 1851, and Philadelphia in 1854.

Slave patrols in the south were abolished upon the abolition of slavery in the 1860s. The legal tactics of the slave patrols are reflected in the vigilante tactics of the Ku Klux Klan.

In the 19th century, local private vigilant and detective societies supplemented law enforcement by identifying and arresting criminals and protecting property rights. New Jersey, for example, had more than 80 such societies. These groups, often termed "anti-horse-thief" associations, were authorized by statute in some states and established through private acts of incorporation in others. Members of these societies were volunteers who generally paid membership fees.

In the late 19th and early 20th century, there were few specialized units in police departments. In 1905, the Pennsylvania State Police became the first state police agency established in the United States, as recommended by President Theodore Roosevelt's Anthracite Strike Commission and Governor Samuel Pennypacker.

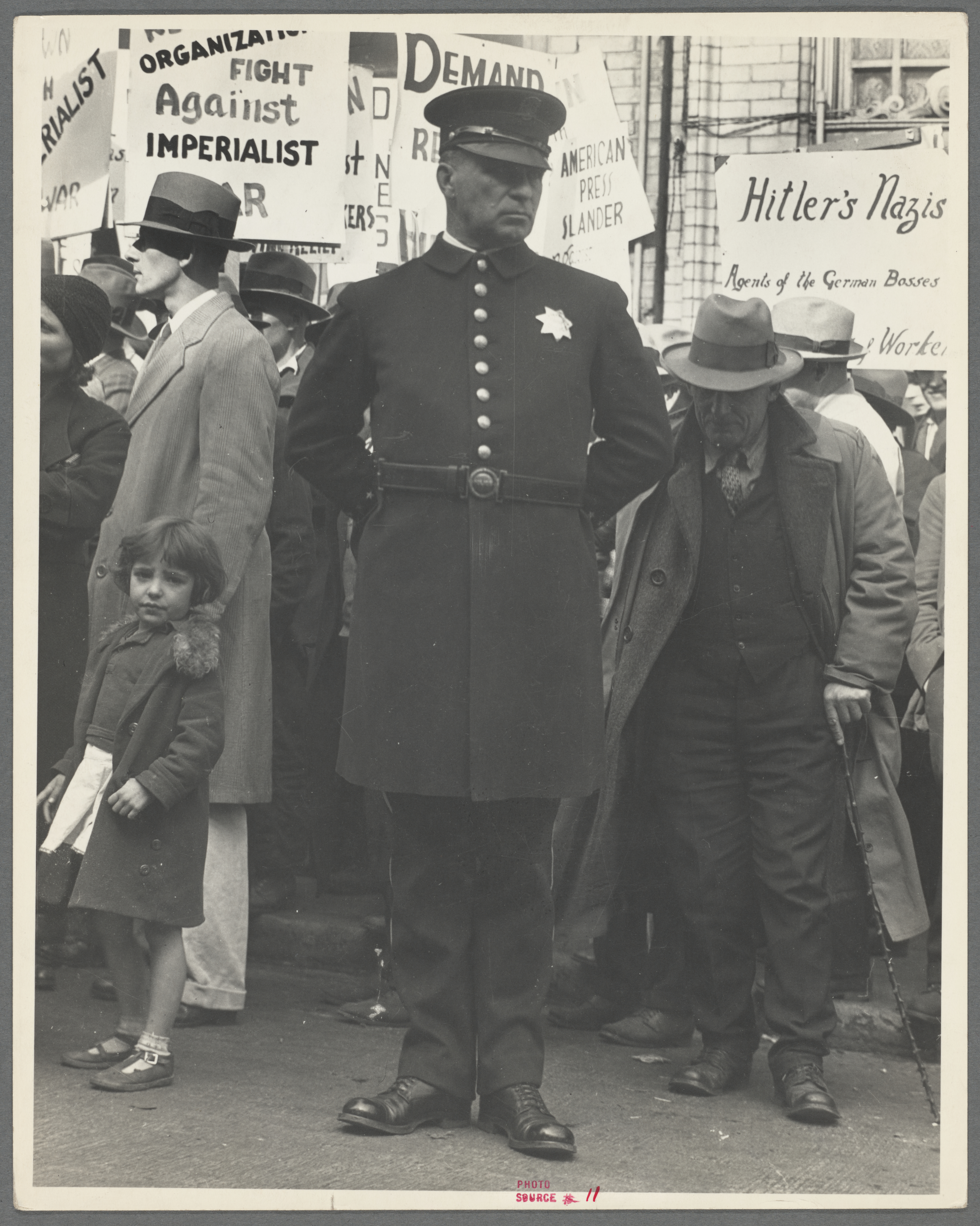
A San Francisco Police Department officer on duty at an anti-Nazi rally in 1936

The advent of the police car, two-way radio, and telephone in the early 20th century transformed policing into a reactive strategy that focused on responding to calls for service. In the 1920s, led by Berkeley, California police chief August Vollmer, police began to professionalize, adopt new technologies, and place emphasis on training. With this transformation, police command and control became more centralized. Orlando Winfield Wilson, a student of Vollmer, helped reduce corruption and introduce professionalism in Wichita, Kansas, and later in the Chicago Police Department. Strategies employed by O.W. Wilson included rotating officers from community to community to reduce their vulnerability to corruption, establishing a non-partisan police board to help govern the police force, a strict merit system for promotions within the department, and an aggressive recruiting drive with higher police salaries to attract professionally qualified officers.

Despite such reforms, police agencies were led by highly autocratic leaders, and there remained a lack of respect between police and the community. During the professionalism era of policing, law enforcement agencies concentrated on dealing with felonies and other serious crime, rather than focusing on crime prevention. Following urban unrest in the 1960s, police placed more emphasis on community relations, and enacted reforms such as increased diversity in hiring. The Kansas City Preventive Patrol study in the 1970s found the reactive approach to policing to be ineffective. The cost of policing rapidly expanded during the 1960s. In 1951, American cities spent $82 per person on policing. Adjusting for inflation, police spending increased over 300% by 2016, to $286 per person.

In the 1990s, many law enforcement agencies began to adopt community policing strategies, and others adopted problem-oriented policing. In the 1990s, CompStat was developed by the New York Police Department as an information-based system for tracking and mapping crime patterns and trends, and holding police accountable for dealing with crime problems. CompStat, and other forms of information-led policing, have since been replicated in police departments across the United States.

== Powers of officers ==
The number of arrests in the US, "all crimes", as reported by the FBI, began a decrease in the early 2010s.

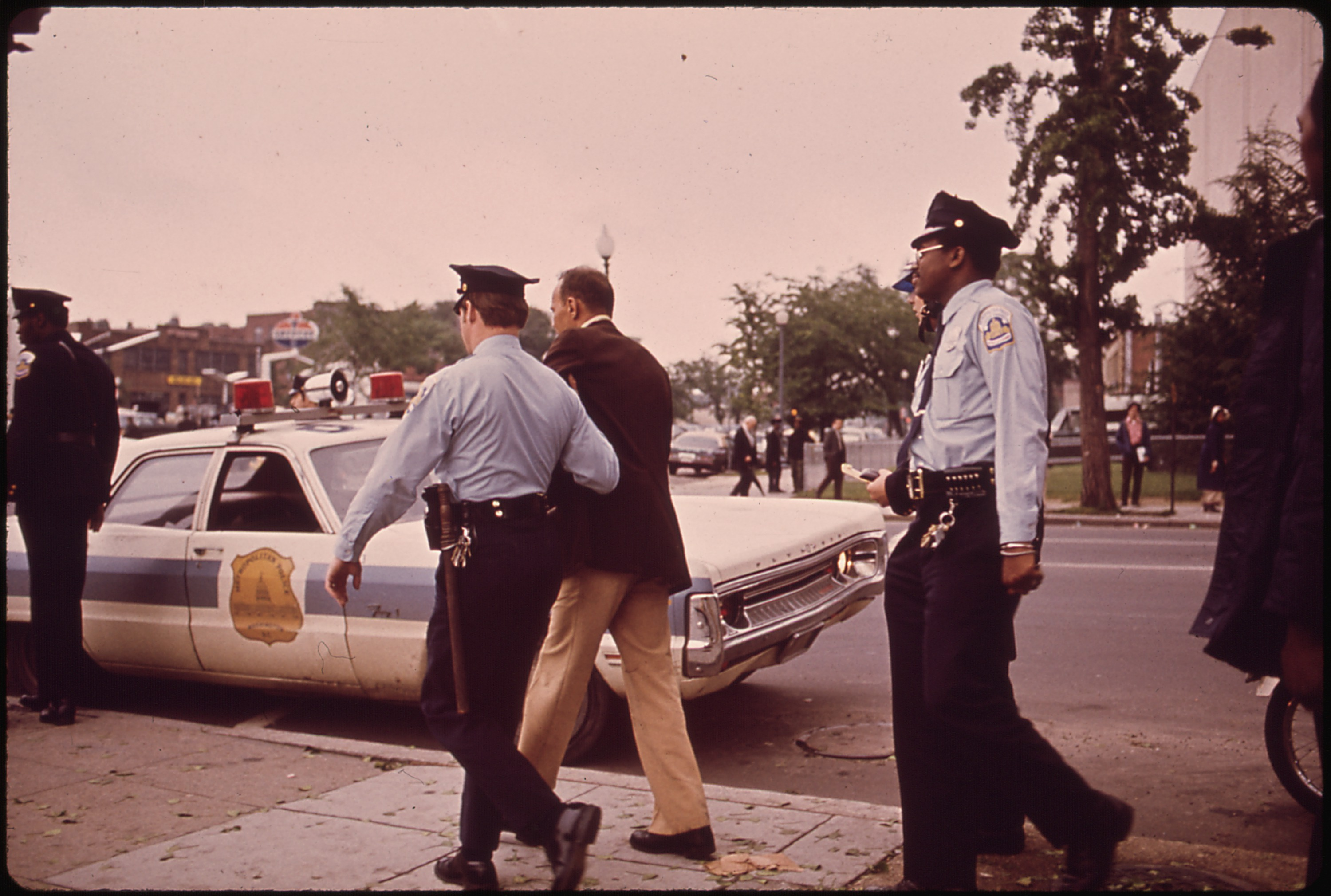
Metropolitan Police Department of the District of Columbia officers arresting a man for public intoxication in 1974

Law enforcement officers are granted certain powers to enable them to carry out their duties. When there exists probable cause to believe that a person has committed a serious crime, a misdemeanor in their presence, or a select-few misdemeanors not in their presence, a law enforcement officer can handcuff and arrest a person, who will be held in a police station or local jail pending a judicial bail determination or an arraignment.

In 2010, the FBI estimated that law enforcement agencies made 13,120,947 arrests (excluding traffic violations). Of those persons arrested, 74.5% were male and 69.4 percent of all persons arrested were white, 28.0 percent were black, and the remaining 2.6 percent were of other races.

A law enforcement officer may briefly detain a person upon reasonable suspicion of involvement in a crime but short of probable cause to arrest. Merely lawfully detaining a person—in and of itself—does not deprive a person of their Fourth Amendment right against unlawful searches. Federal, state, and local laws, and individual law enforcement departmental policies govern when, where, how, and upon whom a law enforcement officer may perform a "pat down," "protective search," or "Terry frisk," based on several U.S. Supreme Court decisions (including Terry v. Ohio (1968), Michigan v. Long (1983), and Maryland v. Buie (1990)):

In Terry v. Ohio, the landmark decision introducing the term "Terry frisk", or "frisk", to the broader public (italics added):

Our evaluation of the proper balance that has to be struck in this type of case leads us to conclude that there must be a narrowly drawn authority to permit a reasonable search for weapons for the protection of the police officer, where he has reason to believe that he is dealing with an armed and dangerous individual, regardless of whether he has probable cause to arrest the individual for a crime. The officer need not be absolutely certain that the individual is armed; the issue is whether a reasonably prudent man in the circumstances would be warranted in the belief that his safety or that of others was in danger.

=== Interrogation ===
In the United States, police interrogations are conducted under an adversarial system, in which the police seek to obtain material that will aid in convicting a suspect rather than discovering the facts of the case. To this end, a variety of tactics are employed.

The Reid technique is widely used by U.S. law enforcement officers for interrogation purposes. It involves steps to obtaining a confession and methods for detecting signs of deception in the suspect's body language. The technique has been criticized for being difficult to apply across cultures and as eliciting false confessions from innocent people. An example is described in the analysis of the Denver police's January 2000 interrogation of 14-year-old Lorenzo Montoya, which took place during its investigation of the murder of 29-year-old Emily Johnson.

== Controversies ==
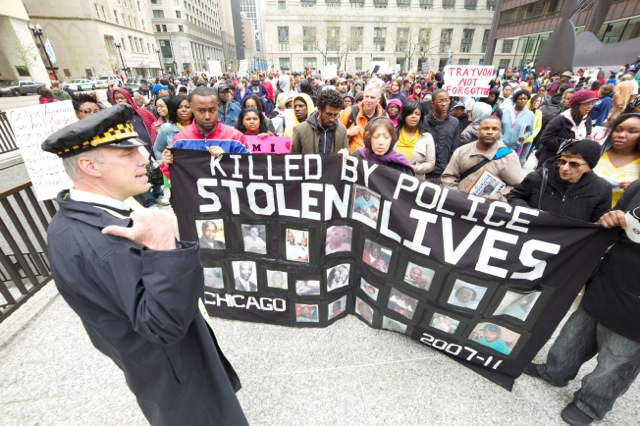
A Chicago Police Department officer in front of protestors during a protest over the killing of Trayvon Martin, part of Occupy Chicago, in 2012

=== Abuse of sex workers ===
Sex worker abuse by police officers can occur in one or more ways. Police brutality refers to the intentional use of excessive force by a police officer, be it physical, verbal, or psychological. Police corruption is a form of police misconduct where an officer obtains financial benefits and/or career advancements in exchange for not pursuing, or selectively pursuing, an investigation or arrest. Police misconduct refers to inappropriate actions taken by police officers in connection with their official duties. Sex workers, particularly poor sex workers and those who had been manipulated, coerced, or forced into sex work, are at risk of being obliged or otherwise forced to provide free sexual services to police officers out of fear of being harmed or arrested. Some sex workers have reported that they have encountered police officers who have physically assaulted them without evidence of a crime and without making an arrest.

Studies have been conducted to examine the extent and frequency of abuse experienced by sex workers in the United States. Steven D. Levitt and Sudhir Alladi Venkatesh have noted that there has been difficulty in obtaining reliable data due to prostitution being largely illegal in the United States, rendering standard data sources uninformative. A 2005 study of sex workers found that 16% have experienced police violence. According to another study, a third of violence against sex workers is committed by police officers.

Concerns have been raised about the health and rights of sex workers and the role police have in either improving or worsening them by utilizing prostitution law, with some critics stating that in areas such as Washington, D.C., the laws effectively "legitimized unconstitutional police behavior that had long existed in the District."

Police abuse can have long-lasting consequences. Sex workers who are forced to move to another area can end up in areas where they feel less safe, and there have been reports of disrupted medication routines and medical schedules due to arrests. Organizations such as Human Rights Watch have stated that police abuse in countries such as the United States has led to sex workers becoming distrustful of officers, deterring them from reporting attacks from clients, and are one of the primary sources of violence. Some sex workers have further reported that they see the legal system as being unhelpful, as they feel that the system does not provide them with access to resources, that it pressures them to accept guilty pleas even when innocent, and the process of arrest and trial is humiliating.

=== Deadly force and death in custody ===
In most states, law enforcement officers operate under the same self-defense laws as the general public. Generally, when the first responder or a member of the public is at risk of serious bodily injury and/or death, lethal force is justified. Most law enforcement agencies establish a use of force continuum and list deadly force as a force of last resort. With this model, agencies try to control excessive uses of force. Nonetheless, some question the number of killings by law enforcement officers, including killings of people who are unarmed or have a permit to be armed, raising questions about alleged widespread and ongoing excessive use of force. Other non-fatal incidents and arrests have raised similar concerns.

The racial distribution of victims of US police lethal force is not proportionate to the racial distribution of the US population. Whites account for the largest racial group of deaths, but are under-represented, accounting for 45% of police killings (and 60% of the population). Blacks are over-represented, accounting for 24% of police killings (and 13% of the population). Hispanics are proportionately represented, accounting for 17% of police killings (and 18% of the population). Others (including Asian, Native American, and others) are under-represented, accounting for 4% of police killings (and 8% of the population).

A 2021 study published in The Lancet found that over 30,000 people have died by police violence in the United States from 1980 to 2018.

=== Gangs ===
Since the 1970s, several deputies of the Los Angeles County Sheriff's Department have formed internal gangs in which membership is exclusive to certain sheriff's deputies, often along ethnic lines, and requires certain acts, such as police violence (particularly against people of color), for initiation into said gang. Members are often tattooed and are expected to maintain the blue wall of silence (i.e. not snitch or report misconduct on or about other officers), fabricate evidence, engage in police corruption, and engage in criminal activity such as vandalism and homicide, among other things. Historically, almost all instances of deputy gang violence have either been ignored by the Los Angeles County District Attorney's Office or the office has stood by the members of the deputy gangs, alongside the tolerance or assistance of the county sheriff. Although not unique to the Los Angeles County Sheriff's Department, it suffers from the most prolific case of the existence of law enforcement gangs in the state.

=== Militarization of police ===
The militarization of both rural and urban law enforcement has been attributed to the United States' involvement in wars during the 20th century, although some attribute the militarization to the more recent campaigns on drugs and terror. Historian Charles Beard argued that cultural change during the Great Depression encouraged the militarization of law enforcement, whereas Harwood argues that the creation of Special Response Teams and tactical units within law enforcement during the 1960s began such a trend.

Beginning in the 1990s, the use of military equipment and tactics for community policing and for public order policing has become more widespread under the 1033 program. The program prompted discussion among lawmakers in 2014 after unrest in Ferguson, Missouri. President Obama introduced restrictions in 2015 on the transfer of surplus military equipment to police. In 2017, the Trump administration announced it would reinstate the program. Although the 1033 program intended to provide equipment for free to law enforcement agencies, heavy-armored vehicles designed for warfighting conditions came saddled with hefty and difficult maintenance requirements which can burden agencies heavily with unexpected costs.

=== No-knock warrants ===
The use of no-knock warrants has become widespread and controversial. Their use has led to misconduct, unlawful arrests, and deaths.

=== Qualified immunity ===
The U.S. Supreme Court first introduced the qualified immunity doctrine in 1967, originally with the rationale of protecting law enforcement officials from frivolous lawsuits and financial liability in cases where they acted in good faith in unclear legal situations. Starting around 2005, courts increasingly applied the doctrine to cases involving the use of excessive or deadly force by police, leading to widespread criticism that it, in the words of a 2020 Reuters report, "has become a nearly failsafe tool to let police brutality go unpunished and deny victims their constitutional rights".

=== Phone Surveillance ===
The use of stingrays by United States law enforcement is an investigative technique used by both federal and local law enforcement in the United States to obtain information from cell phones by mimicking a cell phone tower. The devices which accomplish this are generically known as IMSI-catchers, but are commonly called stingrays, a brand sold by the Harris Corporation.

=== Terry stops ===
A Terry stop in the United States allows the police to briefly detain a person based on reasonable suspicion of involvement in criminal activity. Reasonable suspicion is a lower standard than probable cause which is needed for arrest. When police stop and pat-down a pedestrian, this is commonly known as a stop and frisk. When police stop an automobile, this is known as a traffic stop. If the police stop a motor vehicle on minor infringements in order to investigate other suspected criminal activity, this is known as a pretextual stop.

=== Torture ===
In more modern policing, police brutality has involved torture. Police officials have generally described these cases as aberrations or the actions of criminals in police uniform, as New York City Police Commissioner Howard Safir described the attack on Abner Louima. Police brutality critics, such as law professor Susan Bandes, have argued that such a view is erroneous and that it "allows police brutality to flourish in a number of ways, including making it easier to discount individual stories of police brutality, and weakening the case for any kind of systemic reform."

In 1936, the Supreme Court recognized in Brown v. Mississippi that confessions extracted through police violence are inadmissible as evidence.

In the 1970s and 1980s the Chicago Police Department's Area 2 unit under Commander Jon Burge repeatedly used electroshock, near-suffocation by plastic bags and excessive beating on suspects. The City of Chicago's Office of Professional Standards (OPS) concluded that the physical abuse was systematic and, "The type of abuse described was not limited to the usual beating, but went into such esoteric areas as psychological techniques and planned torture."

In 1997, Abner Louima was sodomized with a plunger by New York City police. The officer was convicted and sentenced to 30 years in prison.

In May 2006 in Geneva, Switzerland the United Nations Committee against Torture released a report, which took note of the "limited investigation and lack of prosecution" in connection to accusations of torture in Areas 2 and 3 of the Chicago Police Department and called on American authorities to "promptly, thoroughly and impartially" investigate the accusations, and provide the committee with more information.

In 1983 Texas sheriff James Parker and three of his deputies were convicted for conspiring to use waterboarding to force confessions. The complaint said they "subject prisoners to a suffocating water torture ordeal in order to coerce confessions. This generally included the placement of a towel over the nose and mouth of the prisoner and the pouring of water in the towel until the prisoner began to move, jerk, or otherwise indicate that he was suffocating and/or drowning." The sheriff was sentenced to ten years in prison, and the deputies to four years.

In September 1997, two former officers from the Adelanto Police Department, San Bernardino County, California, were jailed for two years on federal charges, after pleading guilty to beating a suspect during questioning and forcing another man to lick blood off the floor in 1994.

According to the Innocence Project, about 25 percent of wrongfully convicted innocent people were coerced into making false confessions or false incriminating statements. Most of the victims were threatened by the terror of harsher sentences if they remained non-compliant.

=== Warren v. District of Columbia ===
In the 1981 case Warren v. District of Columbia, the ultimate ruling was that United States law did not require law enforcement officers to protect the general population, that ordinary citizens could not be classified as persons requiring special protection, and the officers had no legal duty to protect.

This and other cases have been used to establish legal precedents in many jurisdictions across the United States. Such precedents are often used to protect law enforcement officers and organizations from being charged with inaction during riots or mass shootings.

=== Civil asset forfeiture ===
Rules on civil asset forfeiture allow law enforcement officers to seize anything which they can plausibly claim was the proceeds of a crime. The property-owner need not be convicted of that crime; if officers find drugs in a house, they can take cash from the house and possibly the house itself. Commentators have said these rules provide an incentive for law enforcement officers to focus on drug-related crimes rather than crimes against persons, such as rape and homicide. They also provide an incentive to arrest suspected drug-dealers inside their houses, which can be seized, and to raid stash houses after most of their drugs have been sold, when officers can seize the cash.

=== Recruitment practices ===
Despite safeguards around recruitment, some police departments have at times relaxed hiring and staffing policies, sometimes in violation of the law, most often in the cases of local departments and federally funded drug task forces facing staffing shortages, attrition, and needs to quickly fill positions. This has included at times the fielding (and sometimes the arming) of uncertified officers (who may be working temporarily in what is supposed to be a provisional limited-duty status prior to certification) and the hiring of itinerant "gypsy cops", who may have histories of poor performance or misconduct in other departments. In some cases, such as the Seattle Police Department learned in 2024, a Department may begin with several thousands of applications but by the end of the recruitment drive, less than 100 applicants are qualified.

=== Racial profiling ===
Racial profiling by law enforcement at the local, state, and federal levels, leads to discrimination against people in the African American, Native American, Asian, Pacific Islander, Latino, Arab, and Muslim communities of the United States. Examples of racial profiling are the use of race to determine which drivers to stop for minor traffic violations (commonly referred to as 'driving while black or African, Asian, Native American, Middle Eastern, Maghrebis, Hispanic, or brown'), or the use of race to determine which pedestrians to search for illegal contraband. Besides such disproportionate searching of African Americans and members of other minority groups, other examples of racial profiling by law enforcement in the U.S. include the Trump-era China Initiative following racial profiling against Chinese American scientists; the targeting of Hispanic and Latino Americans in the investigation of illegal immigration; and the focus on Middle Eastern and South Asians present in the country in screenings for ties to Islamic terrorism. These suspicions may be held on the basis of belief that members of a target racial group commit crimes at a higher rate than that of other racial groups.

=== Other concerns ===
The procedural use of strip searches and cavity searches by law enforcement has raised civil liberties concerns.

The practice of taking an arrested person on a perp walk, often handcuffed, through a public place at some point after the arrest, creating an opportunity for the media to take photographs and video of the event, has also raised concerns.

The New York City Police Department came under scrutiny in 2012 for its use of a stop-and-frisk program.

There are a variety of controversies involving the National Fraternal Order of Police and its branches/chapters, including one instance of a billion dollar donation scam.

The use of LRADs for crowd dispersal, although rare, has been met with criticism and legal challenges.

=== Misconduct cases ===
Over the past decades, police departments across the country have been affected by instances of misconduct and brutality. Some prominent examples include the following:

- 1960s: The 1960s marked the height of the Civil rights movement, and much police misconduct came from protests that often turned violent. There were also planned attacks against police stemming directly from the force that was being used by the police against the protesters. President Lyndon Johnson created the Office of Law Enforcement Assistance in 1965. From that, much was done on the federal and local level, such as enhanced training for police personnel. Police officers at that time were often made up of ex-military members who had little training and were left to learn their skills during their job experiences. Law enforcement personnel were also responsible to attend college as a result.
- 1965: The Watts riots of 1965 lasted six days and began following the arrest of Marquette Frye by a white California Highway Patrol officer on suspicion of driving while intoxicated. 34 people were killed, and more than 1,000 were injured. The riots also caused over $40 million in damage.
- 1985: On May 13, 1985, nearly five hundred police officers attempted to clear the MOVE black liberation group compound in Philadelphia, Pennsylvania. After a shootout between police and MOVE members involving automatic weapons and over 10,000 rounds fired, Commissioner Gregore Sambor ordered that the compound be bombed. Two one-pound bombs made of FBI-supplied Tovex were dropped from a police helicopter targeting a fortified, bunker-like cubicle on the roof of the house. The resulting explosions ignited a fire from fuel for a gasoline-powered generator stored in the rooftop bunker. The fire spread and eventually destroyed approximately sixty-five nearby houses. Eleven people, including five children aged 7 to 13, died in the resulting fire.
- 1991: In March 1991, Officers from the Los Angeles Police Department, while attempting to arrest Rodney King, used what many believed was excessive force. Four LAPD officers used physical force on King after he resisted arrest. A bystander videotaped the incident and later supplied it to local media. The officers were charged with assault and using excessive force, with all officers acquitted of the assault, and three of the four officers acquitted of using excessive of force, during the initial trial. This led to the citywide 1992 Los Angeles riots, during which 63 people were killed and 2,373 were injured; it ended only after the California Army National Guard, the United States Army, and the United States Marine Corps provided reinforcements to re-establish control.
- 2006: Sean Bell was fatally shot on the night before his wedding. It was reported that the police had shot over 50 times at Bell and two of his friends that he was with.
- 2014: Michael Brown was shot by a police officer after struggling with the officer and attempting to take the officer's gun. His death prompted citywide riots and protests that lasted approximately 5 days.
- 2016: Philando Castile was shot by a police officer. Due to the rise of social media and cell phones, it is now easy for people to broadcast police use of force incidents that they see. The trend started with Rodney King and has grown since. In this case, Castile's girlfriend live-streamed his death on Facebook. The video gained approximately 3.2 million views by the next day.
- 2020: George Floyd was murdered by a Minneapolis Police Department officer in an arrest filmed and uploaded on social media. Officer Derek Chauvin spent over nine minutes with his knee on Floyd's neck, asphyxiating him, despite pleas from onlookers to stop. The incident sparked protests and riots across the United States.

== Accountability and reform ==
Special commissions, such as the Knapp Commission in New York City during the 1970s, have been used to bring about changes in law enforcement agencies. Civilian review boards (permanent external oversight agencies) have also been used as a means for improving police accountability. Review boards tend to focus on individual complaints, rather than broader organizational issues that may result in long-term improvements.

The 1994 Violent Crime Control and Law Enforcement Act authorized the United States Department of Justice's Civil Rights Division to bring civil ("pattern or practice") suits against local law enforcement agencies, to rein in abuses and hold them accountable. As a result, numerous departments have entered into consent decrees or memoranda of understanding, requiring them to make organizational reforms. This approach shifts focus from individual officers to placing focus on police organizations.

Beginning in the 1960s, under President Lyndon Johnson, police reform in the United States became a topic of public notoriety. Actions such as the Katzenbach Commission and cases including Mapp v. Ohio and Miranda v. Arizona were the first of decades of history involving attempted or successful reform. Following the murder of George Floyd at the hands of a police officer, a number of modern reforms were implemented.

=== Calls for abolition ===
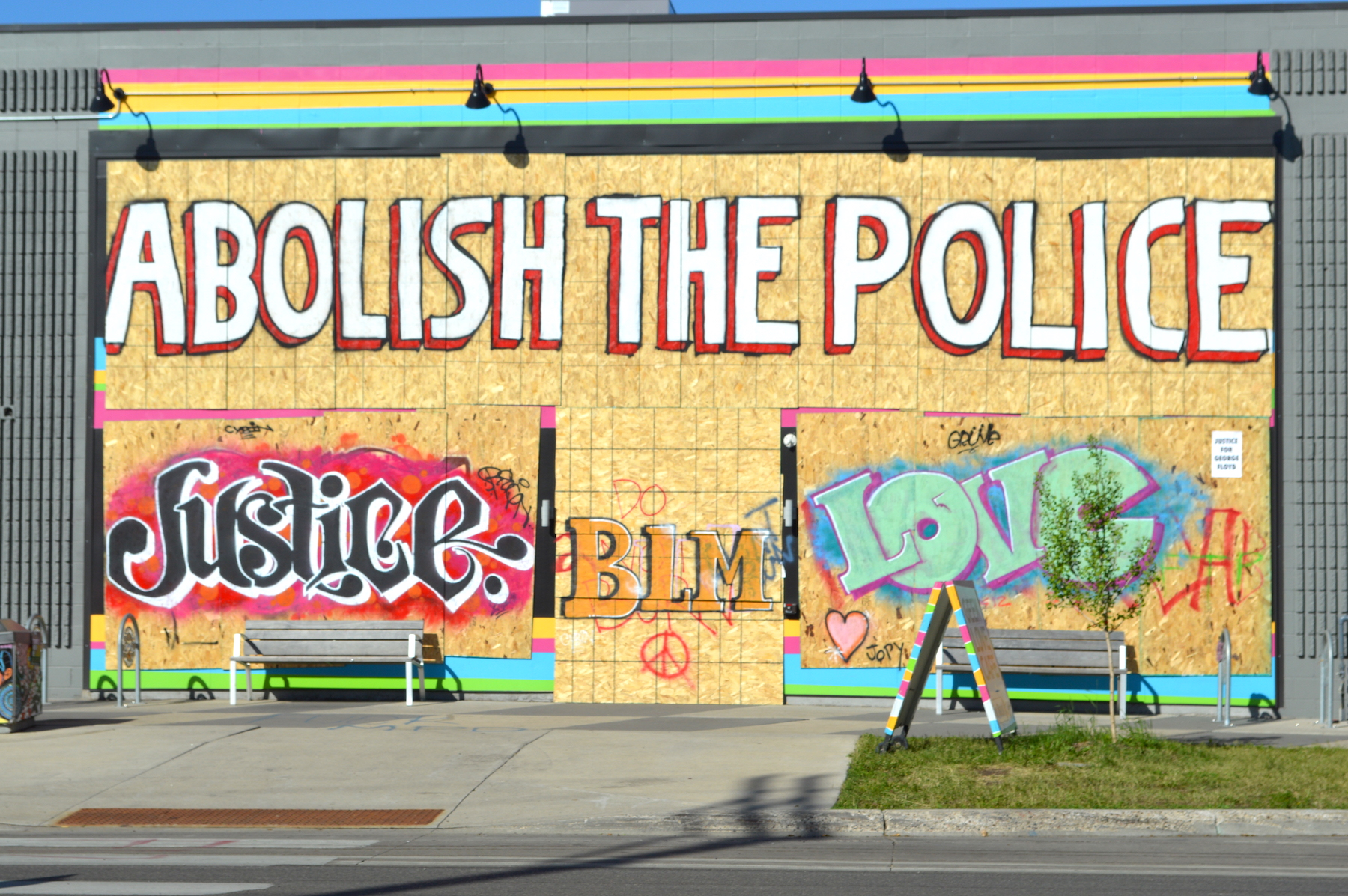
"Abolish the police" graffiti in Minneapolis, Minnesota

While police resentment and calls for abolition of the police have existed in the United States for over a century, police abolition became more popular in 2014 following the killing of Michael Brown and the Ferguson unrest, with national attention being drawn to issues surrounding policing. The roots of police abolition stem from (and are often linked to) the prison abolition movement.

Authors and activists such as Angela Davis and Ruth Wilson Gilmore, who are best known for their prison abolition work, have integrated police abolition into their work when advocating against the carceral system of the United States.

In the summer of 2016, Chicago had a multitude of abolitionist actions and protests in response to the deaths of Michael Brown and Paul O'Neal, among others. This included the occupation of an empty lot across from a Chicago Police Department property, naming it "Freedom Square", as an experiment of a world without police.

In 2017, sociologist Alex S. Vitale authored The End of Policing, calling for police abolition as opposed to reforms.

Police abolition spiked in popularity following the murder of George Floyd by Minneapolis Police officer Derek Chauvin. A super-majority of the Minneapolis City Council (9 of 12 council members) pledged in June 2020 to dismantle the Minneapolis Police Department. The Minneapolis Police Department's funding was ultimately restored to its original levels after a public ballot measure "to remove the Police Department and replace it..." (City Question 2 – Department of Public Safety) was rejected by voters.

== Recruitment and training ==
Nearly all U.S. states and the federal government have laws dictating minimum standards for training requirements which all officers must receive. Many standards apply to in-service training as well as entry-level training, particularly in the use of firearms, with periodic re-certification required. These standards often comply with standards promoted by the US Department of Justice and typically require a thorough background check that potential police recruits must take.

=== Entry qualifications ===
A typical set of criteria dictates that the applicant must:

- Be a United States citizen (waived in certain agencies if the applicant is a lawful resident);
- Have a high school diploma or a GED and if necessary a college degree or served in the United States military without a dishonorable discharge;
- Be in good medical, physical, and psychological condition;
- Maintain a clean criminal record without either serious or repeated misdemeanor or any felony convictions;
- Have a valid driver's license that is not currently nor has a history of being suspended or revoked;
- Be of high moral character;
- Not have a history of prior narcotic or repeated marijuana use or alcoholism;
- Not have a history of ethical, professional, prior employment, motor vehicle, educational, or financial improprieties;
- Not have a history of domestic violence or mental illness;
- Not pose a safety and security risk;
- Be legally eligible to own and carry a firearm.

Repeated interviews, written tests, medical examinations, physical fitness tests, comprehensive background investigations, fingerprinting, drug testing, a police oral board interview, a polygraph examination, and a consultation with a psychologist are common practices used to review the suitability of candidates. In Connecticut, a recruit can obtain a CHIP certification which is proof of a passed police physical test that can be used for any police department applications throughout the state. There are also some police departments that allow the recruit to choose between a 1.5 mile run or a 300 meter sprint.Recruiting in most departments is competitive, with more suitable and desirable candidates accepted over lesser ones, and failure to meet some minimum standards disqualifying a candidate entirely. Police oral boards are the most subjective part of the process and often disqualifies the biggest portion of qualified candidates. Departments maintain records of past applicants under review, and refer to them in the case of either reapplication or requests between other agencies.

=== Training ===
Police academies exist in every state and also at the federal level. Policing in the United States is highly fragmented, and there are no national minimum standards for licensing police officers in the U.S. Researchers say police are given far more training on use of firearms than on de-escalating provocative situations. On average, US officers spend around 21 weeks training before they are qualified to go on patrol, which is far less than in most other developed countries. Similar European training programs can last more than three years.

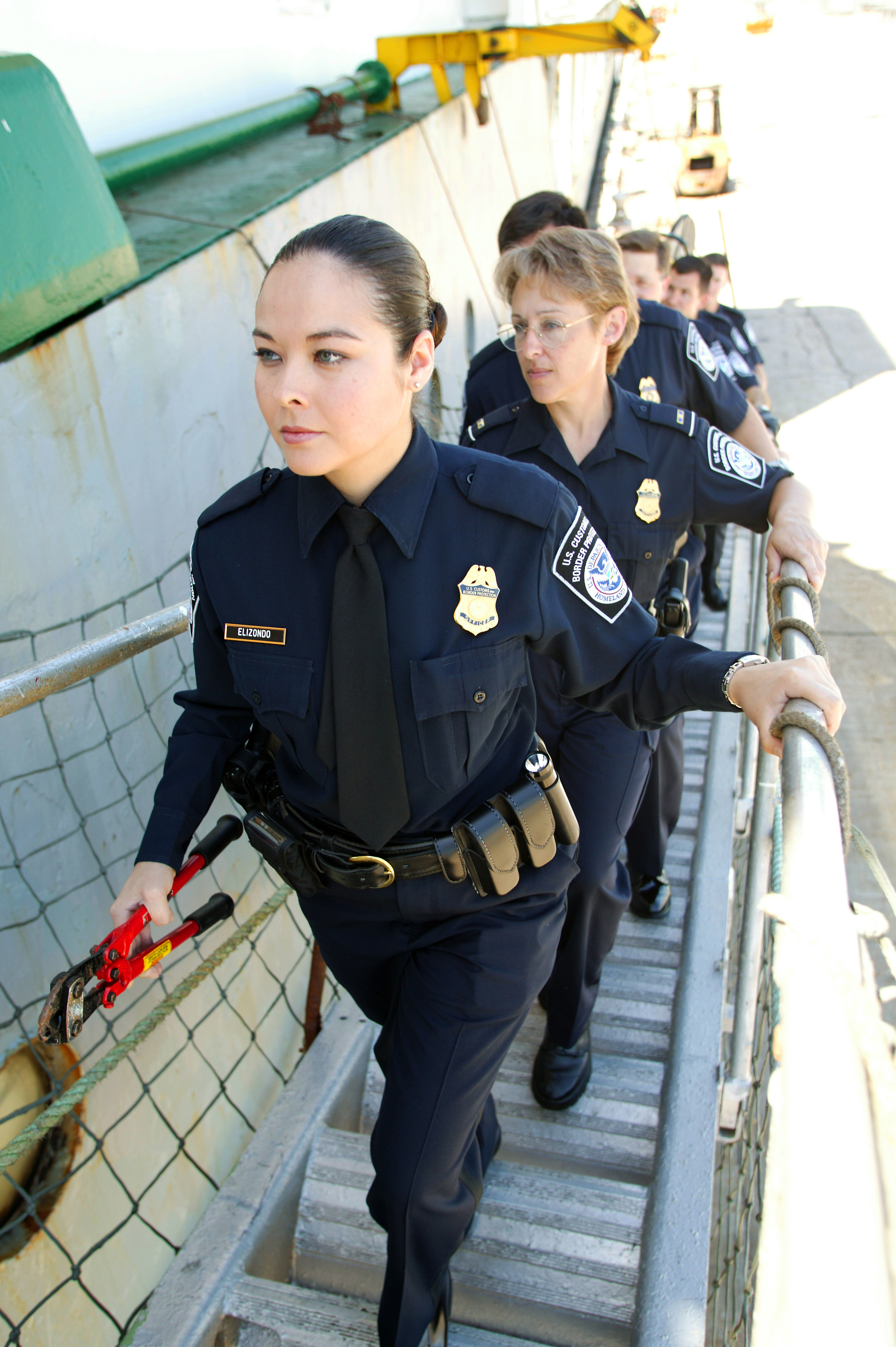
CBP Office of Field Operations officers boarding a ship in the US and Canada.

== Equipment ==
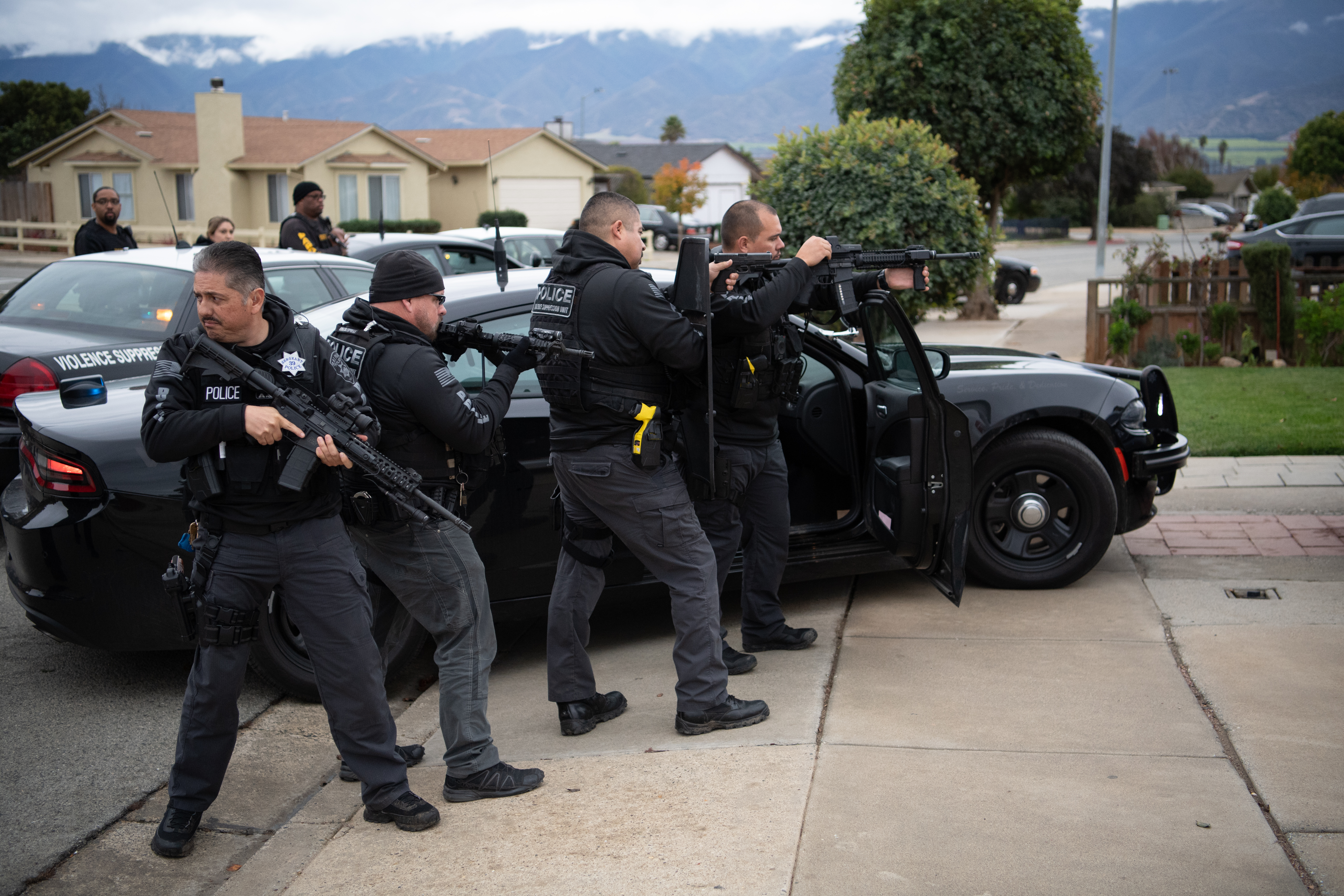
U.S. Marshals and local police using a variety of equipment to conduct a gang arrest in Salinas, California

=== Vehicles ===
Police use a wide range of vehicles in their duties. Police vehicles are used for patrol, responses, and pursuits, and generally carry much of an officer's equipment, including communication devices and tools. Police vehicles in the United States have traditionally been sedans produced by the Big Three (General Motors, Ford, and Chrysler), though SUVs, crossovers, pickup trucks, station wagons, and a wide variety of other vehicles have seen use among police departments historically and presently, in both standard and specialized roles.

Apart from cars, law enforcement also rely on helicopters, and small fixed-wing aircraft, for a variety of functions including: observational support, search and rescue, vehicle pursuits, and transportation of personnel. Additionally, boats and other watercraft are used for patrolling bodies of water, water rescue operations, enforcement of fish and game laws, and securing locations such as sea ports.

=== Firearms ===
All police officers in the United States carry firearms while on duty and usually carry a handgun at minimum. Many are also required to be armed off-duty, and are often required to have a concealable off-duty handgun. Among the most common sidearms are models produced by Glock, Smith & Wesson, SIG Sauer, Beretta, and Heckler & Koch, usually in 9mm, .40 S&W, .357 SIG, or .45 ACP.

Until the late 1980s and early 1990s, most American police officers carried revolvers, typically in .38 Special or .357 Magnum calibers, as their primary duty weapons. At the time, Smith & Wesson, Colt, Ruger, and Taurus models were popular with police officers, the most popular being .38 caliber revolvers produced by Smith & Wesson or Colt. Since then, most agencies have switched to semi-automatic pistols due to their higher stopping power, higher rate of fire, and greater magazine capacity. Historic events influencing the switch to pistols by police included the 1980 Norco shootout, the 1986 FBI Miami shootout, and the 1997 North Hollywood shootout.

Some police departments allow qualified officers to carry shotguns, semi-automatic rifles, or (very rarely) submachine guns in their vehicles for additional firepower. These are typically intended to be used when their use would be necessary or ideal compared to handguns, such as when confronting a visibly armed or armored suspect, or when a handgun would not provide the range, accuracy, or rate of fire required for the situation, such as when engaging a suspect from a distance or in close-quarters combat.

=== Less-lethal weapons ===
==== Baton ====
Police officers often carry an impact weapon—a baton, also known as a nightstick. The common nightstick and the side handle baton have been replaced in many departments by collapsible batons such as the ASP baton, though some departments continue to use them either as an option or out of tradition, such as the Baltimore Police Department's wooden espantoon batons. One advantage of the collapsible baton is that the wearer can comfortably sit in a patrol vehicle while still wearing the baton on their duty belt. The side handle nightstick usually has to be removed before entering the vehicle.

==== Taser ====
Police officers often carry an electroshock weapon known as a Taser. The handheld electroshock weapon was designed to incapacitate a single person from a distance by using electric current to disrupt voluntary control of muscles. An individual struck by a Taser experiences stimulation of their sensory nerves and motor nerves, resulting in strong involuntary muscle contractions. Tasers do not rely only on pain compliance, except when used in drive stun mode, and are thus preferred by some law enforcement over non-Taser stun guns and other electroshock weapons.

==== Chemical agents ====
- Pepper spray
- Mace
- Pepper-spray projectile (Pepperball gun)

==== Other non-lethal weapons ====
- Beanbag shotgun round
- 40mm Less-Lethal Launcher: Similar to the beanbag shotgun round, the device "fires a 40mm hard foam or sponge projectile."
- BolaWrap: A "remote restraint system" that fires a "tether towards an individual" to wrap around and immobilize them.

=== Specialized weapons ===
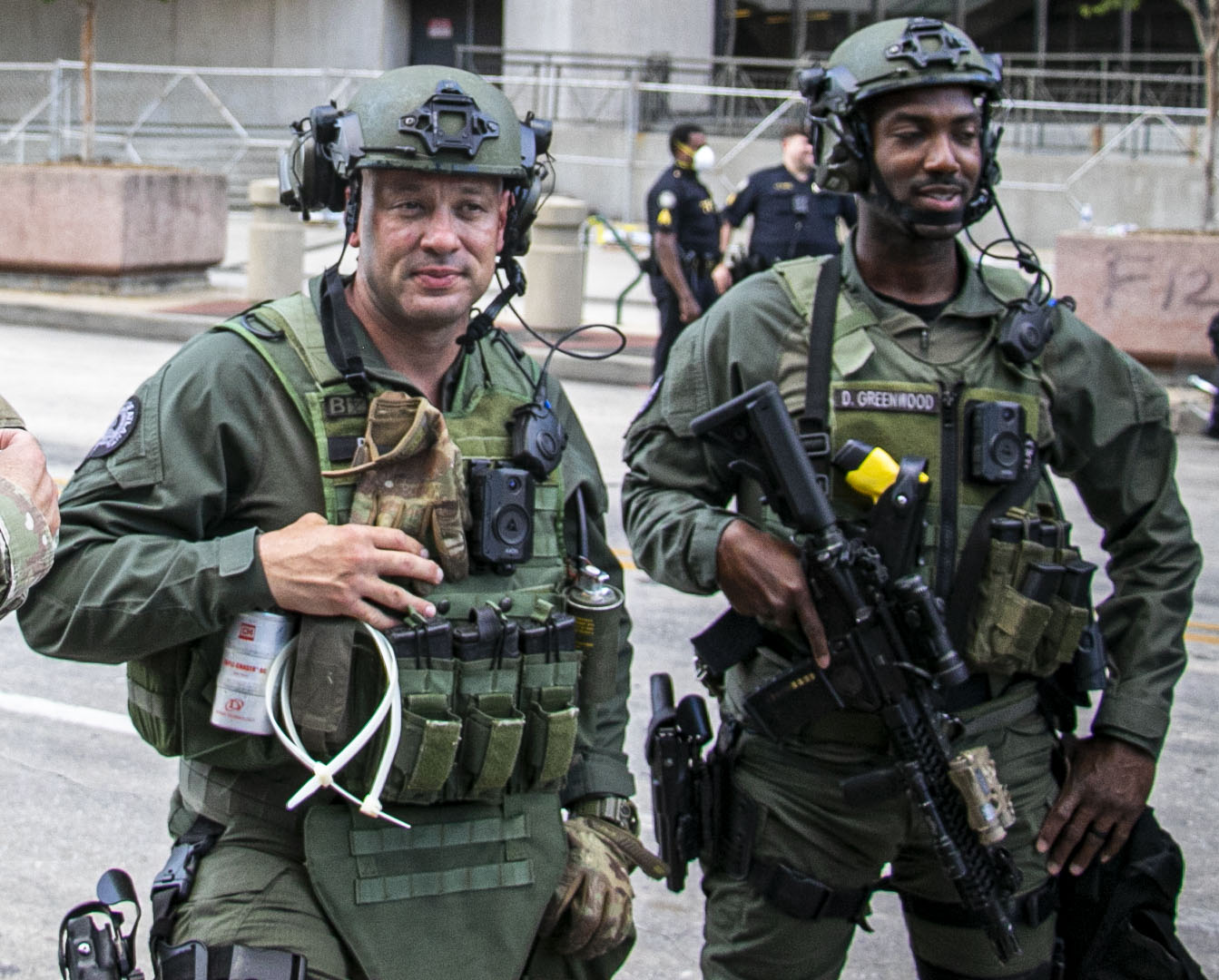
Atlanta Police Department SWAT officers in 2020

Most large police departments maintain special weapons and tactics (SWAT) units, police tactical units trained and equipped to handle situations such as barricaded suspects, hostage situations, terrorist attacks, and high-risk warrants that require greater force, specialized equipment, and special tactics that are unavailable to regular police officers. These units usually have submachine guns, automatic carbines or rifles, semiautomatic or pump-action combat shotguns, sniper rifles, stun grenades, smoke grenades, ballistic shields, door breaching tools, and other specialized weapons and equipment at their disposal. Some SWAT units are equipped with dedicated armored SWAT vehicles, trucks modified for police operations, or retired military vehicles acquired from the Law Enforcement Support Office. Others are capable of handling other non-combat-related tasks, such as the NYPD's Emergency Service Unit, which is capable of conducting rescue operations.

=== Armor and vests ===
Uniformed police officers often wear body armor, typically in the form of a lightweight Level IIA, II or IIIA vest that can be inconspicuously worn under uniforms, though some departments allow vests to be worn above uniforms with rigs and pouches installed to replace the typical duty belt. Lightweight level IIA, II or IIIa vests are generally capable of stopping most handgun rounds. SWAT teams typically wear heavier Level III or IV tactical armored vests, often with steel or ceramic trauma plates, comparable to those worn by U.S. military personnel engaged in ground operations. Level III or IV vests are more capable of protecting officers from rifle rounds. Officers trained in bomb disposal wear bomb suits designed to protect them from the effects of an explosion when working around live ordnance. Local police foundations have also initiated programs to provide law enforcement agencies with higher level vests that provide greater protection and vests for police dogs.

=== Body-worn camera ===
Multiple states, such as California, Washington, and Illinois, among others, have pending body-worn camera legislation that requires its police officers to be equipped with body-worn cameras when the officers are on duty. Body-worn cameras are video recording devices around three inches long that cost between $129 and $900. There are different body-worn camera models, but a standard body-worn camera includes an on and off switch that enables the image capturing technology to record and store data in the cloud.

Body-worn cameras have become standard due to the rise of complaints about police brutality across the nation. Supporters argue that the use of a body-worn camera allows evidence to be viewed from an unbiased perspective. Body-worn camera models are being developed that are intended to resolve the technology's limitations, such as better audio capturing technology and battery life.

=== Drones ===
In recent years police have recruited unmanned surveillance devices such as small throwable robotics and flying drones to conduct reconnaissance in dangerous locations. These devices can be used to identify the presence of a hostage, locate and/or identify subjects, and reveal the layout of a room. The devices do all this by transmitting real-time audio and video to the pilot, giving police an advantage when they cannot directly see a suspect or enter a location where they are needed. Some other uses for this device may be bomb detection, crash investigations, as well as searching suspicious vehicles.

Flying drones are also being enlisted to help police in dangerous situations such as a barricaded suspect or a hostage situation. These drones increase safety by providing information that can be used in mapping and planning. These devices equipped with cameras allow officers to get a bird's eye view of a scene in an emergency, allowing responders to safely get much closer to a scene than they could if they went in on foot.

=== Vehicle pursuit tools ===
- Spike strips
- Grappler: "The Grappler is a device that uses a heavy-duty nylon net deployed from the front of a pursuing police vehicle, and the net wraps around the rear tire of the suspect vehicle, Bringing a pursuit to a controlled stop."
- StarChase

== Communication and information ==
=== Radio systems ===
Law enforcement in the United States uses a variety of VHF, UHF, or digital trunked radio transceivers mounted in their vehicles, with individual officers carrying portable handsets or ear-worn headsets for communication when away from their vehicles. Frequencies, channels, equipment, and radio usage procedures vary by jurisdiction.

Some agencies have implemented encrypted radio systems which prevent the general public from listening in to their communications with radio scanners. The decision to use encrypted radios may be compelled onto the agency in some situations, while others adopt encryption voluntarily.

=== 911, dispatchers, CAD, and MDCs ===
Depending on the organization and structure of emergency service agencies in the jurisdiction where a 911 call is made, the call may be answered at a public safety answering point that is located in a local police, county sheriff/police, state police/highway patrol, fire department, or emergency medical service agency dispatching facility; alternatively, some agencies or municipalities have combined their resources and personnel into dedicated or joint answering facilities.

Once a call is received and the relevant information is collected, a dispatcher will dispatch the call by recording the incident information into a computer-aided dispatch (CAD) and broadcasting the call over a dispatch radio channel (specific procedures vary by jurisdiction). Officers may have access to a mobile data terminal (MDT) or mobile digital computer (MDC) which allows them to interface with the CAD as well as search for other information such as looking up license plates.

Some CAD programs include a record management system (RMS) which is a type of program used to write and store police reports and incident notes.

=== Real-time crime centers, surveillance, and monitoring ===
Modern policing incorporates a variety of real time information sources including Automatic number-plate recognition, gunshot detection systems, and closed circuit/networked cameras.

Real-time crime centers (RTCC), sometimes called real-time information centers (RTIC) or real-time operations centers (RTOC), are office spaces where law enforcement personnel ingest and analyze data to help officers working in the field. RTCC's leverage tools such as GPS monitoring of police vehicles, live feeds from police drones/helicopters/body-cameras, publicly available information such as social media posts, and information from 911 callers, emergency radios, and other agencies in order to more effectively inform their response and understanding of ongoing emergencies or crimes in progress.

RTCC personnel may also be directly responsible for operating drones in the field.

=== National Law Enforcement Telecommunications System (NLETS) ===
A variety of national, regional, state, and local information systems are available to law enforcement agencies in the U.S., with different purposes and types of information. One example is the National Law Enforcement Telecommunications System (NLETS), an interstate justice and public safety network owned by the states supporting inquiry into state systems for criminal history, driver's license and motor vehicle registration, as well as supporting inquiry into federal systems, such as the Department of Homeland Security's (DHS) U.S. Immigration and Customs Enforcement (ICE) Law Enforcement Support Center, the Drug Enforcement Administration (DEA) National Drug Pointer Index (NDPIX), and the Federal Aviation Administration (FAA) Aircraft Registry and the Government of Canada's Canadian Police Information Centre (CPIC).

NLETS operates primarily through a secure private network through which each state has an interface to the network that all agencies within the state operate through. The federal and international components operate very similarly. Users include all U.S. states and territories, some federal agencies, and certain international agencies. The primary operational site for the network is housed in Arizona, with a secure backup site located in the East Central U.S.

Through the NLETS network, law enforcement and criminal justice agencies can access a wide range of information, from standard driver license and vehicle queries to criminal history and Interpol information. Operations consist of nearly 1.5 billion transactions a year to over one million PC, mobile, and handheld devices in the U.S. and Canada at 45,000 user agencies, and to 1.3 million individual users.

=== Collection and dissemination of information ===
The Freedom of Information Act along with similar state-level legislation such as the California Public Records Act places a variety of information possessed by the government, including law enforcement, into the public domain and makes it available for request. Agencies collect, report, and publish a variety of statistical data, such as the National Incident-Based Reporting System and Uniform Crime Reports.

Generally, aside from expunged, sealed, or juvenile-related cases, arrest records are public records.

Depending on local, state, or federal laws, (as well as agency policy) law enforcement agencies may be required to notify the public of certain types of criminal incidents. For example, the Clery Act requires timely warnings to be published in the event of certain types of offences. Another example is California Assembly Bill No. 748 which "requires agencies to release any 'recording that relates to a critical incident,' or law enforcement shooting."

Public safety agencies, as well as municipal governments, sometimes use notification systems that the public can voluntarily enroll in to receive alerts or notices for public safety or law enforcement related incidents.

Other methods of emergency information dissemination used by law enforcement include Amber alerts and Silver Alerts.

== Police population ==
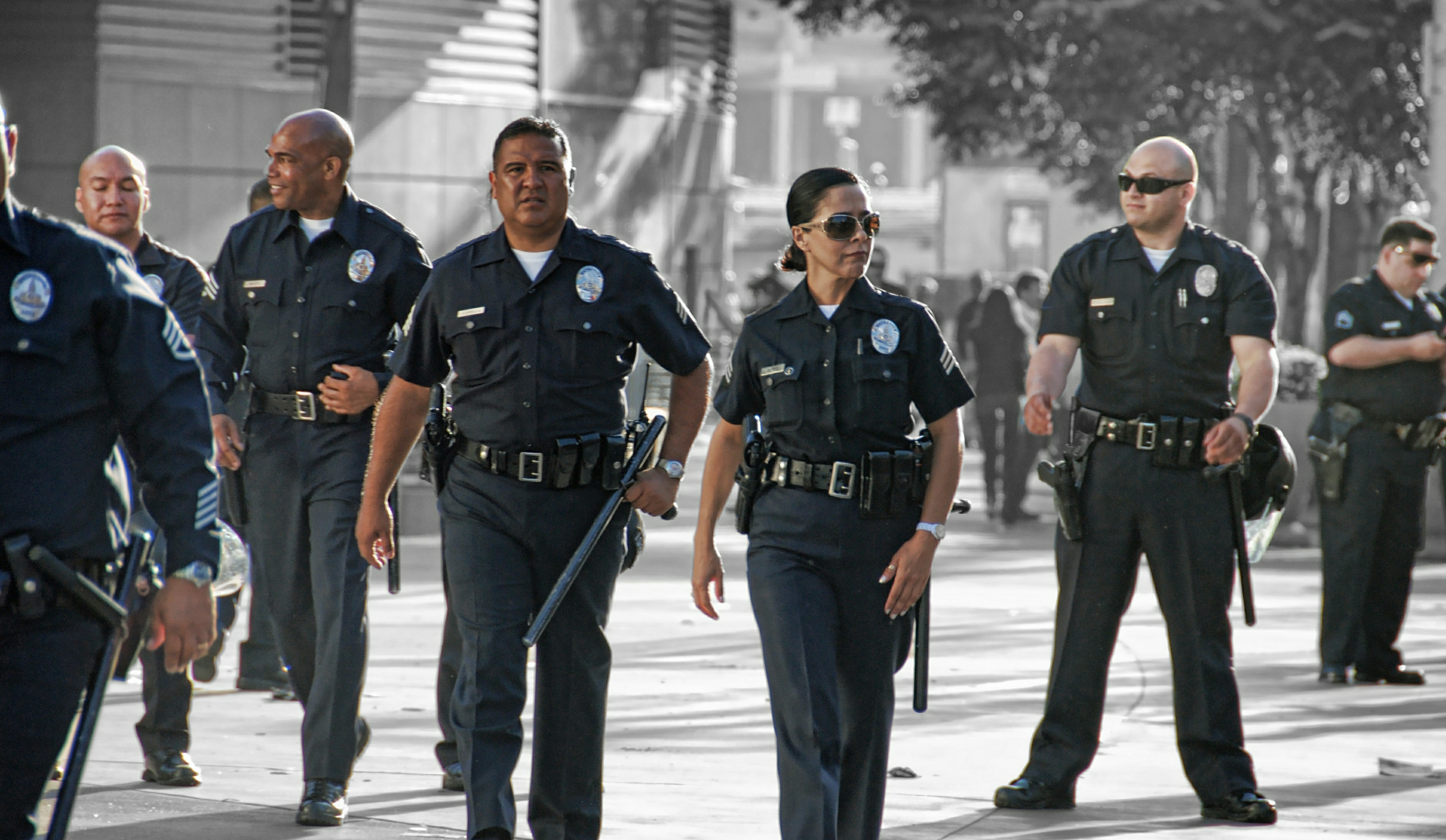
Los Angeles Police Department officers at the Staples Center

In 2008, federal police agencies employed approximately 120,000 full-time law enforcement officers, authorized to make arrests and carry firearms in the United States.

The 2008 Bureau of Justice Statistics' Census of State and Local Law Enforcement Agencies (CSLLEA), found there were 17,985 state and local law enforcement agencies employing at least one full-time officer or the equivalent in part-time officers.

In 2008, state and local law enforcement agencies employed more than 1.1 million people on a full-time basis, including about 765,000 sworn personnel (defined as those with general arrest powers). Agencies also employed approximately 100,000 part-time employees, including 44,000 sworn officers.

From 2004 to 2008, overall full-time employment by state and local law enforcement agencies nationwide increased by about 57,000 (or 5.3%). Sworn personnel increased by about 33,000 (4.6%), and nonsworn employees by about 24,000 (6.9%). From 2004 to 2008, the number of full-time sworn personnel per 100,000 U.S. residents increased from 250 to 251. From 1992 to 2008, the growth rate for support personnel was more than double that of sworn personnel.

Local police departments were the largest employer of sworn personnel, accounting for 60% of the total. Sheriffs' offices were next, accounting for 24%. About half (49%) of all agencies employed fewer than 10 full-time officers. Nearly two-thirds (64%) of sworn personnel worked for agencies that employed 100 or more officers.

In 2019, the FBI estimated that approximately 1,003,270 law enforcement personnel were employed nationwide and distributed across more than 13,250 agencies. Of those, 697,195 were sworn officers, with 306,075 civilian employees. According to FBI UCR's the total number of agencies (including federal agencies) in the United States dropped from 19,071 to 18,794 (excluding 277 federal agencies).

=== Demographics ===
Law enforcement has historically been a male-dominated profession. There are approximately 18,000 law enforcement agencies at federal, state, and local level, with more than 1.1 million employees. There are around 12,000 local law enforcement agencies, the most numerous of the three types. In a 2013 survey, the Law Enforcement Management and Administrative Statistics found that 72.8% of local police officers were white. Black or African American were 12.2% (the black population in the United States is roughly 13%) and Latino or Hispanic are 11.6%. Women made up 17% of full-time sworn officers. Women, Asian, and Hispanic officers are significantly under-represented in police forces. Many law enforcement agencies are attempting to hire a diversity of recruits to better represent their communities.

=== Changes in personnel numbers ===
Fifteen of the 50 largest local police departments employed fewer full-time sworn personnel in 2008 than in 2004. The largest declines were in Detroit (36%), Memphis (23%), New Orleans (13%), and San Francisco (10%).

Ten of the 50 largest local police departments reported double-digit increases in sworn personnel from 2004 to 2008. The largest increases were in Phoenix (19%), Prince George's County (Maryland) (17%), Dallas (15%), and Fort Worth (14%).

=== Culture and political attitude ===
In the United States, traditional police culture is associated with conservative right-wing politics. Commonly proposed characteristics of traditional police culture in the United States include self-perception of police as "warrior cops" in an "us vs. them" battle against a threatening and potentially criminal public.

Police culture has been at the forefront of public dialogue since several high-profile police killings in the 2020s (especially the murder of George Floyd) resulted in racial unrest and associated calls to defund the police.

A 2025 study found that police officers tend to skew more Republican than the population of their jurisdictions.

=== Salary ===
Salary varies widely for police officers, with most being among the top third of wage-earners, age 25 or older, nationwide. The median annual wage for criminal investigators was $86,940 and $65,540 for patrol officers, in May 2020. The lowest 10 percent earned less than $38,420, and the highest 10 percent earned more than $146,000.

The median wages for police and detective occupations in May 2020 were as follows:

- $86,940 for detectives and criminal investigators
- $72,580 for transit and railroad police
- $65,540 for police and sheriff's patrol officers
- $58,040 for fish and game wardens

=== Deaths ===
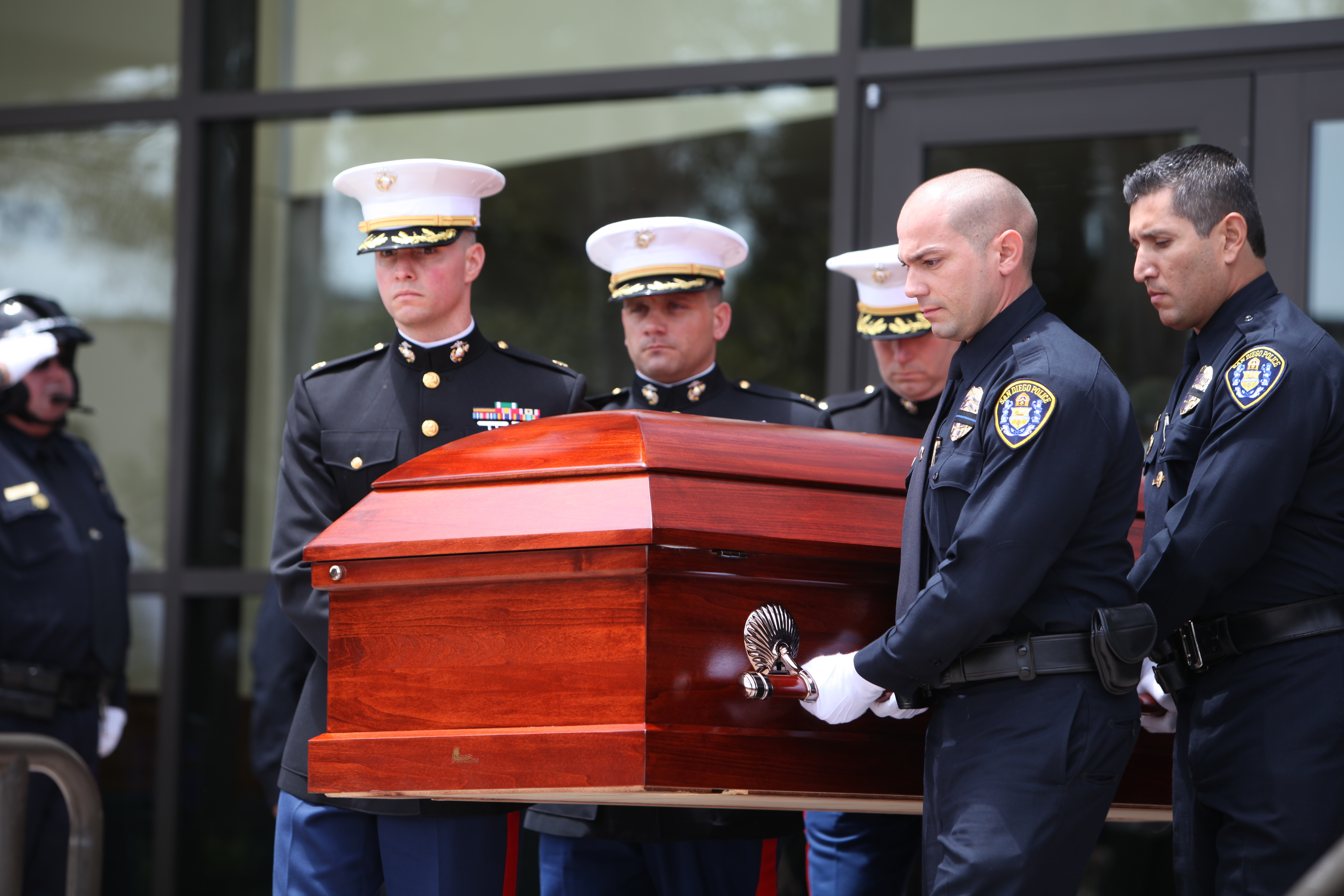
San Diego Police Department officers and U.S. Marines carrying the coffin of an officer killed in the line of duty in 2011

An infographic intended for police officers and firemen outlining how to avoid being struck by passing cars at roadside incidents

The main cause of death to law enforcement officers are roadway related incidents. This includes both crashes and struck-by incidents. Between the years of 2011 and 2020, there were a total of 1,387 officer line-of-duty deaths excluding COVID-19 related deaths. Of these deaths, 286 officers died because of crashes or 21% of total deaths. In addition, 114 officers died because of struck-by incidents or 8% of total deaths.

Between 2005 and 2019, over 200 law enforcement officers died because of struck-by incidents. These deaths account for 24% of motor vehicle-related officer deaths. This can occur in many situations, but commonly occurs at traffic stops when officers are in or near roadways.

According to 2017 FBI figures and stated above, the majority of officer deaths on the job were the result of accidents rather than homicides. Civilians faced a homicide rate of 5.6 per 100,000, while police faced a homicide rate of 3 per 100,000.

Throughout 2021, 262 officers have died from various medical conditions, the two leading causes were contracting COVID-19 (242) and heart attack (17), with 1 death associated with responding to the September 11 attacks. As of December 2021, line-of-duty officer deaths totaled 126 (felonious and accidental).

The Officer Down Memorial Page (ODMP) has tracked approximately 26,237 officers who have died in the line of duty in the United States since 1776. A memorial is also hosted in Washington, DC, by the National Law Enforcement Officers Museum of the National Law Enforcement Officers Memorial Fund (NLEOMF).

Since January 1, 2022, authorized agencies are able to submit suicide information for their officers, based on the Law Enforcement Suicide Data Collection Act, enacted by the United States Congress in June 2020.

== See also ==
- Police officer certification and licensure in the United States
- Police ranks of the United States
- Police uniforms in the United States
- Police brutality in the United States
- List of law enforcement agencies in the District of Columbia
- List of unarmed African Americans killed by law enforcement officers in the United States
- List of U.S. state and local law enforcement agencies
- Police academies in the United States
- Slave patrol

Related:

- Crime in the United States
- Incarceration in the United States
- Terrorism in the United States
