= The End of Policing =

2017 non-fiction book

- Front cover
- Author: Alex S. Vitale
- Subject: Police abolitionism
- Genre: Non-fiction
- Publisher: Verso Books
- Publication date: October 10, 2017
- Publication place: United States
- Pages: 288
- ISBN: 9781784782894

The End of Policing is a 2017 book by the American sociologist Alex S. Vitale. In it, Vitale argues for the eventual abolition of the police, to be replaced variously by decriminalization or with non-law enforcement approaches, depending on the crime. Vitale argues that the function of police is to uphold inequalities of class, gender, race, or sexuality.

The book was met with mixed critical reception by academics and reviewers, including praise for Vitale's writing style and level of research, but criticism that his suggested political approaches needed further development. The book was variously criticized as not arguing against all forms of policing, or as failing to acknowledge research which suggests that police reduce the rate of crime.

== Background ==
Author Alex S. Vitale is a sociologist at Brooklyn College. He began writing The End of Policing in 2014, drawing from his 1990s volunteering for the Coalition on Homelessness, San Francisco. The book was published on October 10, 2017 by Verso Books. At the time of its publication, Brooklyn College held a panel with Vitale and Heather Mac Donald, who argued that modern policing is not institutionally racist.

Following the murder of George Floyd in May 2020, a public discourse about defunding or abolishing the police led to Vitale appearing in a wide range of news media. Verso temporarily made the e-book copy of The End of Policing available for free. It had been downloaded 200,000 times by June 17, 2020.

== Synopsis ==
The book is about police in the contemporary United States and the nature of policing. Vitale argues that the purpose of police is not to deal with instances of social ills, but to uphold inequalities in society on the axes of class, gender, race and sexuality. Historically, Vitale writes, the police have facilitated slavery and colonialism and suppressed workers' rights movements. He believes that the conditions for crime arise due to the implementation of conservative policies such as support for a supply-side economics model, austerity, redlining and union busting. Topics covered by the book include the criminalization of the mentally ill, homeless people and sex workers; policing of schools; the war on drugs; and border policing by the police, Immigration and Customs Enforcement (ICE), the military and the National Guard.

Vitale believes that policing should be disbanded in full, with decriminalization of some crimes such as sex work and drug usage, and public infrastructure or non-law enforcement approaches for other crimes. For instance, government agencies and private companies could provide homeless people with permanent housing. He recommends drug rehabilitation centers for addicts, improved education and a different employment system, as well as more mental health care availability and open borders.

Vitale writes that police are trained by private companies in highly militarised ways. He says that diversifying the police force or requiring them to wear body cameras will not change the underlying systemic racism in police procedures. On the topic of gangs, he proposes that police and prisons do not deter gang involvement and that gangs are not composed only of black and Latino people and may not have centralized leadership structures. Analyzing the prohibition of alcohol in the U.S. from 1920 to 1933, Vitale writes that the amount of illegal alcohol consumed remained constant even as police increased their numbers of arrests. In the last chapter, Vitale says that the police have always served a political role, giving examples of police forces under dictatorships and U.S. police with regards to the Red Scares, COINTELPRO and surveillance of other social movements.

== Reception ==
The book received praise by Kirkus Reviews as "clearly argued". In the journal Race & Class, Jasbinder S. Nijjar found it "impressively researched and thoroughly readable". Micol Siegel of the journal Social Justice recommended it as "particularly useful to activists seeking material for self-edification, reading groups, or popular education campaigns". E. Tammy Kim of The Nation reviewed it as a "compelling digest of the dynamics of crime and law enforcement, and a polemic against the militarization of everything".

In a mixed review, Adam Greenfield of the Los Angeles Review of Books critiqued that Vitale fails to suggest how progress towards his suggested goals could be made and said that his arguments have "little [...] to do with how power works in the world we actually find ourselves living in". However, [they] praised that the "great strength" of the book is "in demonstrating that if the shape of American policing is historical, it is also contingent". Karim Murji of the LSE Review of Books found that the book's "bold title and radical aim is somewhat hedged by its presentation", though it is a "welcome contrast" to "normative theorising about" the police. Murji argued that Vitale "does not dismiss police reform in its entirety", believing that he could have taken ideas from prison abolitionism, and that he could have made further comments about how his suggested policies could gain traction.

Connor Woodman, writing in a blog post for Verso, criticized Vitale's statement that police surveillance of social movements "should be forbidden unless there is specific evidence of serious criminal activity", arguing that this fails to endorse riots or violent protest done to achieve political change, which Woodman views as necessary for resisting oppression, giving historical examples. The Indypendent's Michael Hirsch similarly took issue with the chapter on politics, believing that it could have covered "police repression of workers' struggles" more extensively and should have discussed police unions. However, Hirsch also praised the book for its empirical analysis and called it a "must-read for anyone interesting in waging and winning the fight for economic and social justice".

Vox's Matthew Yglesias reviewed that Vitale fails to address economic and sociological literature suggesting that increased police numbers correlate with a reduction in violent crime, arguing that reform is valuable. He found that in The End of Policing, "the causal reasoning is a little shaky and the willingness to consider trade-offs nonexistent", though it "contains some good ideas" about housing and mental health policy. Alec Karakatsanis of Current Affairs offered a rebuttal to Yglesias, commenting that crime statistics come from police, who selectively collect data, and do not include crimes committed by police. Karakatsanis argued that "crime", not interchangeable with harm, is constructed by powerful people and that Yglesias's cited studies do not support his conclusions. Karakatsanis wrote that abolitionists seek structural solutions and accountability to harm. Karakatsanis said that The End of Policing is largely about functions of police other than crime reduction.

On March 22, 2022, a copy of The End of Policing was held up by Texas senator Ted Cruz, who was critical of the book, at Ketanji Brown Jackson's senate confirmation hearing. Afterwards, sales of the book significantly increased, as did those of some other books presented by Cruz.
