= Alex S. Vitale =

American academic

- Born: Houston, Texas
- Occupations: Academic, author

Academic background
- Education: Hampshire College (BA)
- Alma mater: CUNY Graduate Center (PhD)

Academic work
- Discipline: Sociology
- Institutions: Brooklyn College
- Main interests: Community policing, civil disorder, urban politics
- Notable works: The End of Policing

Alex S. Vitale is an American author and professor of sociology at Brooklyn College. He is also the coordinator of the Policing and Social Justice Project at Brooklyn College. His writing has appeared in the New York Times, The Nation, The Appeal, USA Today, Vice News, and other media outlets. Vitale is the author of The End of Policing (2017), which argues for the abolition of police.

== Biography ==
Alex S. Vitale is originally from Houston, Texas. In 1989, he received his Bachelor's in Urban anthropology from Hampshire College. From 1990 to 1993, he served on the staff of the Coalition on Homelessness in San Francisco, where he directed civil rights policy for the organization. He also worked on health care programs and social services programs.

While in San Francisco, Vitale witnessed a national backlash against homelessness. In San Francisco, Mayor Art Agnos attempted to address homelessness with aggressive ticketing. This was followed by Police Chief Frank Jordan, who became mayor with a platform to aggressively police the homeless. As Vitale later wrote, "Despite these aggressive efforts to restore order, the number of people without a place to live continued to increase and public order remained impaired..."

In 1993, Vitale moved to New York City to attend CUNY Graduate Center. During this era, he was able to observe the transition from the administration of Mayor David Dinkins, which Vitale viewed as politically liberal, to the administration of Mayor Rudolph Giuliani, which Vitale viewed as neoliberal. He observed aggressive policing and scapegoating of the homeless population under the Giuliani administration. In 2001, he received his PhD in Sociology from CUNY Graduate Center.

== Work ==
In 2009, City of Disorder: How the Quality of Life Campaign Transformed New York Politics (NYU Press) was published. In the book, Vitale focuses on the drive to improve quality of life in New York City and other American cities. In particular, he argues that, in the 1990s, New York City politics focused on restoring moral order, which included the "zero tolerance" campaign of Mayor Rudolph Giuliani and an overhaul of prostitution, graffiti, panhandling, and homelessness in the city. This marked a shift toward prioritizing the needs of the middle and upper classes. The book examines how such changes impacted various New York neighborhoods, the NYPD, and city politics.

In 2017, The End of Policing was published. In the book, Vitale argues that the United States should radically reconsider policing, rather than simply reforming it. He argues that the rise of policing in the world was rooted in three primary forms of economic exploitation: colonialism, slavery, and the rise of industrialization in the 19th century. As such, police forces have historically enforced inequality, suppressed workers, and micro-managed black and brown lives. He wrote, "The problem is not police training, police diversity, or police methods. The problem is the dramatic and unprecedented expansion and intensity of policing in the last 40 years, a fundamental shift in the role of police in society. The problem is policing itself." The End of Policing was met with mixed reception, with positive reviews praising his writing style and detail in research, and negative reviews arguing that Vitale's proposed solution is too extreme or not extreme enough.

Following the George Floyd protests, Vitale's work received wider public interest. He has been interviewed on alternatives to policing, as well as the movements to defund or abolish the police, by media outlets such as NPR, the Intercept, Jacobin, the Nation, The Indypendent, Democracy Now, and The Daily Show. In one interview, he explained, "Part of the problem is that for decades now, communities have been told that the only resource they can have to address their community problems is more policing and more incarceration... Our job is to lay out what the alternatives would look like and give people a sense that they have the power to ask for what they really want."

Vitale was interviewed and featured in the award-winning documentary feature film Reimagining Safety (2023) by director Matthew Solomon. The film covers defunding the police and the George Floyd protests.
