= Abdul Hameed Nayyar =

Pakistani physicist and activist

- Dr. A.H. Nayyar in 2011
- Born: 9 January 1945 (age 81); Hyderabad, Hyderabad State, British India
- Citizenship: Pakistan
- Education: Karachi University; Imperial College, London
- Known for: Nuclear arms control and Renewable energy
- Awards: 2010 Joseph A. Burton Award
- Scientific career
- Fields: Condensed Matter Physics
- Workplaces: Lahore University of Management Sciences; Sustainable Development Policy Institute; Quaid-i-Azam University; International Centre for Theoretical Physics
- Thesis: Excitations and mode mixings in rare earth metals (1973)

Abdul Hameed Nayyar (Born 1945), also known as A.H. Nayyar, is a Pakistani physicist, author, and freelance consultant on the issues of education, nuclear safety, and energy. His field of specialization is the physics of condensed matter, and he has served in the faculties of the Quaid-e-Azam University in Islamabad from 1973 till 2005 and the Lahore University of Management Sciences. Nayyar is known for calling for education reforms and military arms control, about which he directed research programs at the Sustainable Development Policy Institute in Islamabad. He is also one of the founding members of The Black Hole, an intellectual space in Islamabad, Pakistan.

== Biography ==
Nayyar was born in Hyderabad, British India, in 1945, to a Punjabi Muslim Khatri family. His family moved to Pakistan after Partition of India 1947. He was educated in Karachi, and attended the Karachi University where he graduated with BSc in Physics in 1964, and MSc in Physics from Karachi University in 1966.

Nayyar went to United Kingdom for his doctoral studies, attending the Imperial College in London where he obtained his PhD in condensed matter physics in 1973. His thesis covered studies on magnetic properties of the excited electrons. Upon returning to Pakistan, he joined the Institute of Theoretical Physics (now department of physics) of the Quaid-i-Azam University (QaU) and served on the faculty until 2005.

After leaving QaU in 2005, Nayyar became involved with the public policy issues regarding the education, renewable and fuel cell energy at the Sustainable Development Policy Institute (SDPI) in Islamabad. Since 1998, Nayyar has been a visiting research scholar at the Princeton University in the United States, and has been on the faculty to instruct courses on physics at the Lahore University of Management Sciences in Pakistan.

== Political advocacy ==
=== Education, peace, and energy ===
Dr. Nayyar co-edited the SDPI report "The Subtle Subversion: The State of Curricula and Textbooks in Pakistan", published in 2003, the report critically examined curriculum guidelines and textbook contents in the mainstream public school system of Pakistan. The report, which was intensely debated on public forums, eventually led to the government exercise to revise school curricula and textbooks (see: Pakistan Studies curriculum). Also from SDPI, he co-authored a critical appraisal of the National Education Policy, published in 2006. He has also researched and written on Madrassa education. For over a year, he served as the Executive Director of Developments in Literacy, an organisation of Pakistani Americans for philanthropic intervention in education to disadvantaged communities in Pakistan. Also for a year in 2010, he served as the Director of the Ali Institute of Education, Lahore. He has since authored a number of articles further criticising the state of education in Pakistan.

=== Peace activism ===
Dr. Nayyar also takes an active interest in the national and international peace movements. Dr. Nayyar is a member of the Global Council of Abolition 2000.

=== Anti-nuclear movement ===
Another area that interests him is nuclear disarmament. He holds a visiting position at the Program on Science and Global Security of the Woodrow Wilson School at Princeton University, US, where he spends summer months conducting technical studies on issues in nuclear disarmament. He is a member of the International Panel on Fissile Materials.

=== Renewable energy ===
In the area of renewable energy, the energy group at SDPI that he helped establish, has studied the question of marketability of renewable energy technologies with a view to identifying policy measures that could promote their use in Pakistan.

== Articles ==
- "Another Nuclear White Elephant", Dawn (Karachi), 25 July 2004.
- "Making Weapons, Talking Peace: Resolving The Dilemma of Nuclear Negotiations", Economic and Political Weekly, 17 July 2004. Revised and reprinted as "Talking Peace, Making War" The News (Islamabad), 8 January 2005.
- "Twisted Truth", Dawn (Karachi), 2 May 2004.
- "A South Asia Nuclear Weapons Free Zone", Himal-South Asia, January 2002.
- "What They Can Agree On", The Hindu, 10 July 2001 and The News (Islamabad), 10 July 2001.
- "Chashma – Another Chernobyl in The Making", The News on Sunday (Islamabad), 23 January 2000.
- "Return of The Khaki", Himal-South Asia, November 1999 (reprinted in CERAS Newsletter (Canada), No. 17, 1999).

== Publications ==
=== Physics ===
- Aiman Al-Omari and A.H. Nayyar, "The Combined Effect of Frustration and Dimerization in Ferrimagnetic Chains and Square Lattices", J. Phys. Condensed Matter 12, 9949 (2000).
- Aiman Al-Omari and A.H. Nayyar, "Dimerization of Ferrimagnets on Chains and Square Lattices", J. Phys. Condensed Matter 11, 465 (1999).
- A.H. Nayyar, "Real Space Renormalization of the Heisenberg Mattis Magnet on a Chain"; in A. Clark (ed.) Many Body Theories, Plenum Press, 1993.
- A.H. Nayyar, "Effects of Short Range Ordering and Random Local Anisotropy on the Dynamical Response of a Disordered Chain: A Renormalization Study", Phys. Rev. B 47, 15023 (1993).
- T. Shaheen, W. Azeem and A.H. Nayyar, "Real Space Renormalization Scheme for Calculating the Dynamical Response of Disordered Chains", Phys. Rev. B 46 0777 (1992).

=== Nuclear policy ===
- Zia Mian, A.H. Nayyar, M. V. Ramana, R. Rajaraman, "Plutonium Production in India and the US-India Nuclear Deal," Gauging US-Indian Strategic Cooperation, Henry Sokolski, ed., Strategic Studies Institute, US Army War College, Carlisle, PA, March 2007.
- Zia Mian, A. H. Nayyar, R. Rajaraman and M. V. Ramana, "Fissile materials in South Asia and the Implications of the US-India Nuclear Deal", Science and Global Security, in press.
- R. Rajaraman, Zia Mian, A.H. Nayyar "Nuclear Civil Defense in South Asia: Is it Feasible?", Economic and Political Weekly, 20 November 2004.
- Zia Mian and A. H. Nayyar, "An Initial Analysis of 85Kr Production and Dispersal from Reprocessing in India and Pakistan", Science and Global Security, vol. 10, No. 3, September–December 2002.
- M. V. Ramana and A. H. Nayyar, "India, Pakistan and the Bomb", Scientific American, December 2001.
- Matthew McKinzie, Zia Mian, A. H. Nayyar and M. V. Ramana, "The Risks and Consequences of Nuclear War in South Asia", in Out of The Nuclear Shadow, Smitu Kothari and Zia Mian (eds.), Zed Books, Rainbow Press & Lokayan, 2001.

=== Energy issues ===
- Waqasullah Khan Shinwari, Fahd Ali and A. H. Nayyar, "Electric power generation from solar photovoltaic technology: is it marketable in Pakistan?”, The Pakistan Development Review, 43(3) 2004 Autumn: p. 267–294
- A. H. Nayyar, “Going up in Smoke”, in “On the Brink: Desperate Energy Pursuits in South Asia”, Panos South Asia, Kathmandu, 2006.
- A. H. Nayyar and Zia Mian, “Pakistan and the Energy Challenge”, in Chernobyl +20: International Perspectives of Energy Policy and the Role of Nuclear Power, Eds. Lutz Mez, Mycle Schneider, and Steve Thomas, Multi-Science Publishing, in press

=== Education ===
- A. H. Nayyar and Ahmed Salim, Critical Issues in Education Policy: Citizens’ Review of the National Education Policy, SDPI, 2006
- A. H. Nayyar and Ahmed Salim (eds.) The Subtle Subversion: The State of Curricula and Textbooks in Pakistan, SDPI, 2004.
- A. H. Nayyar, "Madrassa Education: Frozen in Time" in Education and the State: Fifty Years of Pakistan, Pervez Hoodbhoy (ed.) Oxford University Press, 1997.
- S. Khurshid Hasanain and A. H. Nayyar, "Conflict and Violence in the Educational Process", in Making Enemies, Creating Conflict: Pakistan's Crisis of State and Society, Zia Mian (ed.) Mashal Books, 1997.
- Pervez Hoodbhoy and A. H. Nayyar, "Rewriting the History of Pakistan" in Islam, Politics and the State: The Pakistan Experience, Asghar Khan (ed.) Zed Books, 1985.
