= International Panel on Fissile Materials =

The International Panel on Fissile Materials (IPFM), established in 2006, is a group of independent nuclear experts from 17 countries: Brazil, Canada, China, France, Germany, India, Iran, Japan, Mexico, Norway, Pakistan, South Korea, Russia, South Africa, Sweden, the United Kingdom, and the United States. It aims to advance international initiatives to “secure and to sharply reduce all stocks of highly enriched uranium and separated plutonium, the key materials in nuclear weapons, and to limit any further production”.

The Panel is co-chaired by Alexander Glaser and Zia Mian of Princeton University and Tatsujiro Suzuki of Nagasaki University, Japan. Other members include: Li Bin, José Goldemberg, Frank von Hippel, Pervez Hoodbhoy, Patricia Lewis, Abdul Hameed Nayyar, Seyed Hossein Mousavian, Ramamurti Rajaraman, M.V. Ramana, and Mycle Schneider.

The Panel produces an annual Global Fissile Material Report which summarizes new information on fissile material stocks and production worldwide, as well as periodic research reports.

== See also ==
- International Campaign to Abolish Nuclear Weapons
- Bulletin of the Atomic Scientists
