= Seyed Hossein Mousavian =

Iranian policymaker and scholar

Hossein Mousavian
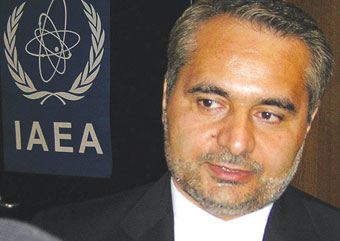
- Mousavian in 2003

Senior Negotiator of Iran for Nuclear Issue
- In office 2003–2005
- President: Mohammad Khatami
- Chief Negotiator: Hassan Rouhani
- Preceded by: Office created
- Succeeded by: Javad Vaidi

Iranian Ambassador to Germany
- In office 1990–1997
- President: Mohammad Khatami; Akbar Hashemi Rafsanjani

Personal details
- Born: 1957 (age 68–69) Kashan, Imperial State of Iran
- Party: Moderation and Development Party
- Other political affiliations: Islamic Republican Party (1979–1987)
- Education: Iran University of Science and Technology; Sacramento City College; Sacramento State University; University of Tehran; University of Kent

Seyed Hossein Mousavian (Persian: سید حسین موسویان, born in 1957 in Kashan) is a former Iranian diplomat and scholar who served on Iran's nuclear Spokesperson team in negotiations with the EU3 (2003-2005) and International Atomic Energy Agency. He retired after 15 years as a Middle East Policy and Nuclear Specialist at Princeton University. He is a visiting research collaborator at Princeton University.

== Early life and education ==
Mousavian was born in 1957 to a prosperous carpet-dealing family in Kashan, a major carpet-manufacturing center. His family had close ties to the Motalefeh, a religiously oriented revolutionary movement that dated back to the early 1960s and was eventually absorbed into the Islamic Republican Party (IRP). Mousavian studied at the Iran University of Science and Technology, as well as Sacramento City College and Sacramento State University in the United States.

In 1981 he was awarded a Bachelor of Science in engineering from Sacramento State University of California. He was awarded an MA in International Relations from the University of Tehran in 1998 and a Ph.D. in International Relations from the University of Kent at Canterbury in 2002.

== Early career in Iran ==
Reuel Marc Gerecht of The Weekly Standard has speculated that Mousavian's father's connections in Motalefeh helped him win access to leading IRP figures and led to his being named editor-in-chief of the Tehran Times, the revolution's English-language newspaper, which was established by IRP founder Mohammad Hosseini Beheshti. During his editorial tenure, from 1980 to 1990, Mousavian authored more than 2,000 articles. He also held several positions in the Iranian government in the 1980s, including a stint as Vice President of the Islamic Propagation Organization (1981–1983), worked with future President Hashemi Rafsanjani as Chairman of the Parliament Administration Organization (1983–1986), and was Head and then Director General of the West Europe department of the Foreign Ministry (1986–1989). During the 1980s, Mousavian played a major role in what he later described, in a 2012 book, as “Iran's humanitarian intervention to secure the release of Western hostages in Lebanon.” However, the hostage-takers (Hezbollah), had acted on instructions from the government in Tehran.

== Ambassador to Germany ==
Mousavian was Iran's Ambassador to Germany from 1990 to 1997. Four Iranian dissidents were murdered at Berlin's Mykonos restaurant in 1992, and five years later, a German court concluded that Iran's Special Affairs Committee had ordered the murders and that the supreme leader, president, foreign minister, and intelligence minister of Iran were all active members of that committee. The court found an Iranian intelligence officer and three Lebanese men guilty and issued an arrest warrant for Iran's intelligence minister. Also, Germany expelled four Iranian diplomats and asked that Mousavian be recalled to Iran; he did return to Tehran shortly thereafter. After the issuance of the arrest warrant for the intelligence minister, which Mousavian described as an insult to the entire population of Iran, Iranian news agencies made veiled threats against Germans abroad. Mousavian echoed, saying that if European nations kept treating Iran as America and Israel did, then they would be treated the same way by Iran.

In 1995, a dossier published in Berliner-Zeitung reported that Iranian intelligence service members from the Ministry of Intelligence of the Islamic Republic of Iran resided at the Iranian embassy in Bonn and were "active throughout Europe". The US State Department spokesman Nicholas Burns said the court ruling "corroborates our long-held view that Iran's sponsorship of terrorism is authorized at senior levels of the Iranian government." The EU invited its other 14 members to recall their ambassadors from Tehran similarly to Germany. This marked the first time that a Western court directly implicated Iran's top leadership in the killing of Iranian dissidents who have sought refuge in the Europe. Iranian opposition figures say at least 20 people in European countries have been killed by hit squads operating on Tehran's instructions since the Islamic theocracy took power in 1979.

On February 6, 2022, in an article published at at The Daily Princetonian, Frank N. von Hippel, a professor at Princeton University and former White House nuclear policy advisor wrote: "the reality is that the German government thoroughly investigated the Mykonos assassinations and the 395-pages explanation of its verdict does not mention Dr. Mousavian. Indeed, Dr. Mousavian has been frequent visitor to Germany since, and he has been involved in high-level policy discussions with senior German officials and parliamentarians and the colleagues from other European governments. These simple, easy to verify facts speak for themselves".

During Mousavian's ambassadorial tenure, the Salman Rushdie affair took place, and Mousavian went on German radio to announce that Iran would not lift its fatwa against Salman Rushdie.

In the same interview, he expressed skepticism that Germany would risk its trade relations with Iran by protesting the Rushdie fatwa. Because of this statement, Social Democratic politician Freimut Duve called for Mousavian's expulsion, saying that he had, in effect, publicly expressed agreement with the fatwa; politicians from other parties echoed Duve's call. The German Foreign Ministry, moreover, summoned Mousavian to a meeting.

During Mousavian's tenure, 24 Iranians were assassinated in Europe. In 1997, a German court concluded that the Iranian leadership, including the foreign ministry, masterminded the murders and that the headquarters for plotting them was the Iranian embassy. During the trial, Abolghasem Mesbahi, a former spy from the Islamic Republic of Iran, testified that “Mousavian was involved in most of the crimes that took place in Europe."

In a 1997 interview with the German Taz Daily, Mousavian expressed support for Hamas and Hizbullah.

== Role in Iranian diplomacy ==
Mousavian played a role in several key developments during his more than two decades working on Iranian foreign affairs. He helped to secure the release of two German hostages held by Hezbollah in Lebanon from 1990 to 1993 and American and other Western hostages held in Lebanon from 1998 to 1999, as well as contributing to the mediation of the largest-ever humanitarian exchange between Israel and Lebanese Hezbollah under Germany's auspices (1995–1996). Mousavian also played a role in Iran's cooperation with the US in Afghanistan against Al Qaeda and the Taliban in 2001. From 2003 to 2005, Mousavian was the Spokesman of the Iranian nuclear negotiation team, which in 2003 agreed for Iran to provisionally suspend uranium enrichment and allow inspections by the International Atomic Energy Agency at its nuclear sites as confidence-building measures. In 2004, while head of the negotiating team, Mousavian asserted Iran's sovereign right to pursue nuclear technology for civilian use and expressed satisfaction that the U.S. had been “isolated” by the IAEA in its attempt to pressure Iran. Mousavian's team was replaced shortly before the election of Mahmoud Ahmadinejad as president in 2005, in tandem with Supreme Leader Ali Khamenei's announcement that Iran would resume enrichment activities.

== Accusations of espionage ==
Mousavian was arrested and briefly jailed by the Ahmadinejad administration in 2007 and publicly accused by the president of espionage for allegedly providing classified information to Europeans, including the British Embassy, before being cleared by the judiciary. There was speculation that his arrest was part of a factional struggle between Ahmadinejad and a triumvirate of his opponents: Akbar Hashemi Rafsanjani, Mohammad Khatami, and Hassan Rouhani, of whom Mousavian was considered an ally. After a year, a spokesman of Iran's judiciary announced that Mousavian had been cleared of the espionage charge after an investigation by three different judges. However, the third of those judges had sentenced him to a suspended term of two years in prison and to a five-year ban from official diplomatic posts because of his confessed opposition to President Ahmadinejad's foreign and nuclear policy.

Accusations were renewed on August 22, 2010, when the Ministry of Intelligence issued a statement repeating the old claims publicly announced by Ahmadinejad in 2007. Mousavian's lawyer has questioned this development, arguing that the Ministry of Intelligence statement ran contrary to the verdict reached three years earlier by the Iranian judiciary.

== Post at Princeton and Controversy ==
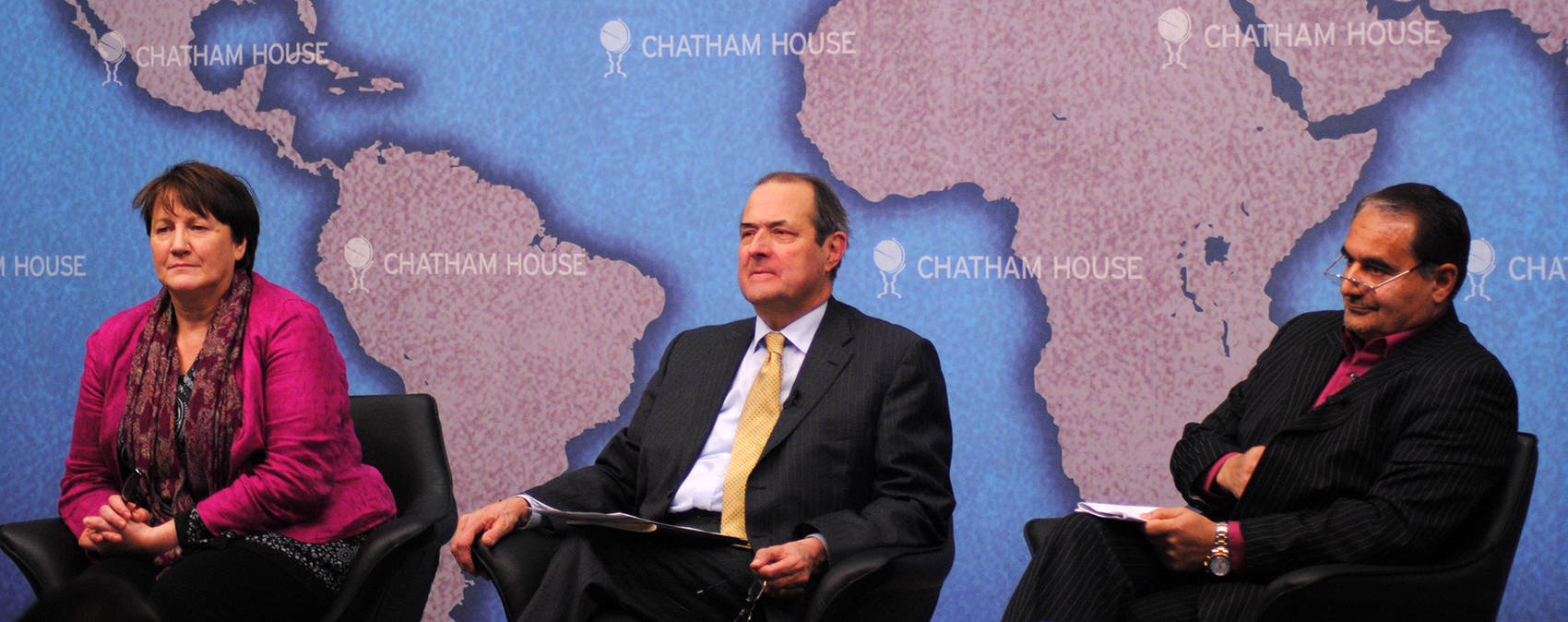
Dr Patricia Lewis, Sir Richard Dalton, Dr Seyed Hossein Mousavian (left to right) at the Chatham House event Nuclear Iran: Negotiating a Way Out.

Mousavian has been a visiting research scholar at Princeton University's Woodrow Wilson School of Public and International Affairs since 2009. He has done advocacy in pursuit of the Iran Nuclear deal, the Joint Comprehensive Plan of Action, and has visited the White House on many occasions during the Barack Obama presidency. It has been claimed that he has made up a fatwa that was issued by the Ali Khameni against the pursuit of nuclear weapons. The House Committee on Education and the Workforce announced on November 16, 2023, that Princeton University is the subject of an investigation over the role of its controversial academic Mousavian, a former Iranian regime ambassador to Germany. In April 2025, Fox News Digital reported that the University of Kent could find “no record” of any 2002 doctoral thesis by Mousavian in its library catalogue and that a Freedom‑of‑Information request for the document was still under internal review. The article also noted that searches of American, British and German academic databases turned up no copy of the dissertation.

== Current views ==
Mousavian expressed deep concern about developments in Iran after that country's 2009 presidential election but continued "to press for the U.S. to engage Tehran in a bid to reduce regional tensions," according to a 2010 article by Jay Solomon in the Wall Street Journal. Mousavian believes that any future Iranian government will continue to pursue a nuclear fuel program, and that the U.S. should therefore improve relations with Tehran as a safeguard against an atomic weapons program. He also opposes UN sanctions against Iran, saying they "only serve to radicalize [Tehran’s] position." Instead of imposing sanctions, the U.S. should "shape a comprehensive dialogue with Iran based on shared interests in stabilizing Iraq and Afghanistan" and "should develop with Tehran a broad security plan for the Persian Gulf that could prove crucial to securing the free flow of energy in and out of the strategic waterway."

Mousavian dismissed as "politically motivated" the conclusions of a November 2011 report by the International Atomic Energy Agency (IAEA) that suggested "possible military dimensions" to Iran's nuclear program.

Writing in National Interest in December 2012, Mousavian questioned the assumption by Western powers that "the best hope of altering Tehran’s nuclear policy and halting its enrichment activities" lies in "comprehensive international sanctions and a credible threat of a military strike." Mousavian maintained that "such punitive pressures... will not change the Iranian leadership’s mindset, and that a military option would be catastrophic" for everyone. Besides, he insisted, Iran has no interest in acquiring nuclear weapons. He offered ten reasons for this, among them that developing nuclear weaponry would be considered "forbidden or haram" under Islam, would "trigger a regional nuclear arms race," and would be contrary to Iran's goal of becoming a modern nation.

In another December 2012 article, Mousavian argued that "U.S. strategists... should understand... the role of religion and clerics" in Iran. Noting that the world's "most powerful ideological-political party... is the Shia Cleric Organization in Iran," he complained that "Western policymakers and some of their 'Iranian experts'... have yet to realize that the clerical system... is a collective decision-making process, with heated discussions and debates among about twenty of the most revered Grand Ayatollahs in the country." Washington, he emphasized, "needs to recognize that Islam is the main source of Iranian power, and the religious establishments will play a key role in the future developments of Iran and the region...Instead of changing Iran's government, the United States should focus its regional policy on three key areas: addressing the Palestinian issue, engaging moderate Islamists, and pursuing a regional security pact."

In a January 2013 New York Times op-ed headlined "How to Talk to Iran," Mousavian and Mohammed Ali Shabani argued that there will be no “resolution of the nuclear standoff” between Iran and the West if Western leaders fail to grasp two key concepts: "maslahat," meaning "expediency, or self-interest" and "labor," meaning "face – as in, saving face." For millennia, they wrote, "Persian culture has been distinguished by customs that revolve around honor and esteem....There are almost no instances in modern Iranian history when maslahat has trumped aberu. The West has poorly understood these concepts. This was particularly true under President Bush, who rewarded Iran’s tacit acceptance of the American invasion of Afghanistan by labeling Iran a member of an 'axis of evil.'" Mousavian and Shabani expressed the belief that "Iran would be open to new measures regarding the transparency of its nuclear program and would agree not to pursue any capability to enrich uranium beyond that needed to fuel atomic power plants, if its legitimate right to enrichment under the Nuclear Nonproliferation Treaty was recognized and if an agreement to remove sanctions was reached."

Mousavian is a member of the International Panel on Fissile Materials, an organization that works to end the production and use of enriched uranium and plutonium.

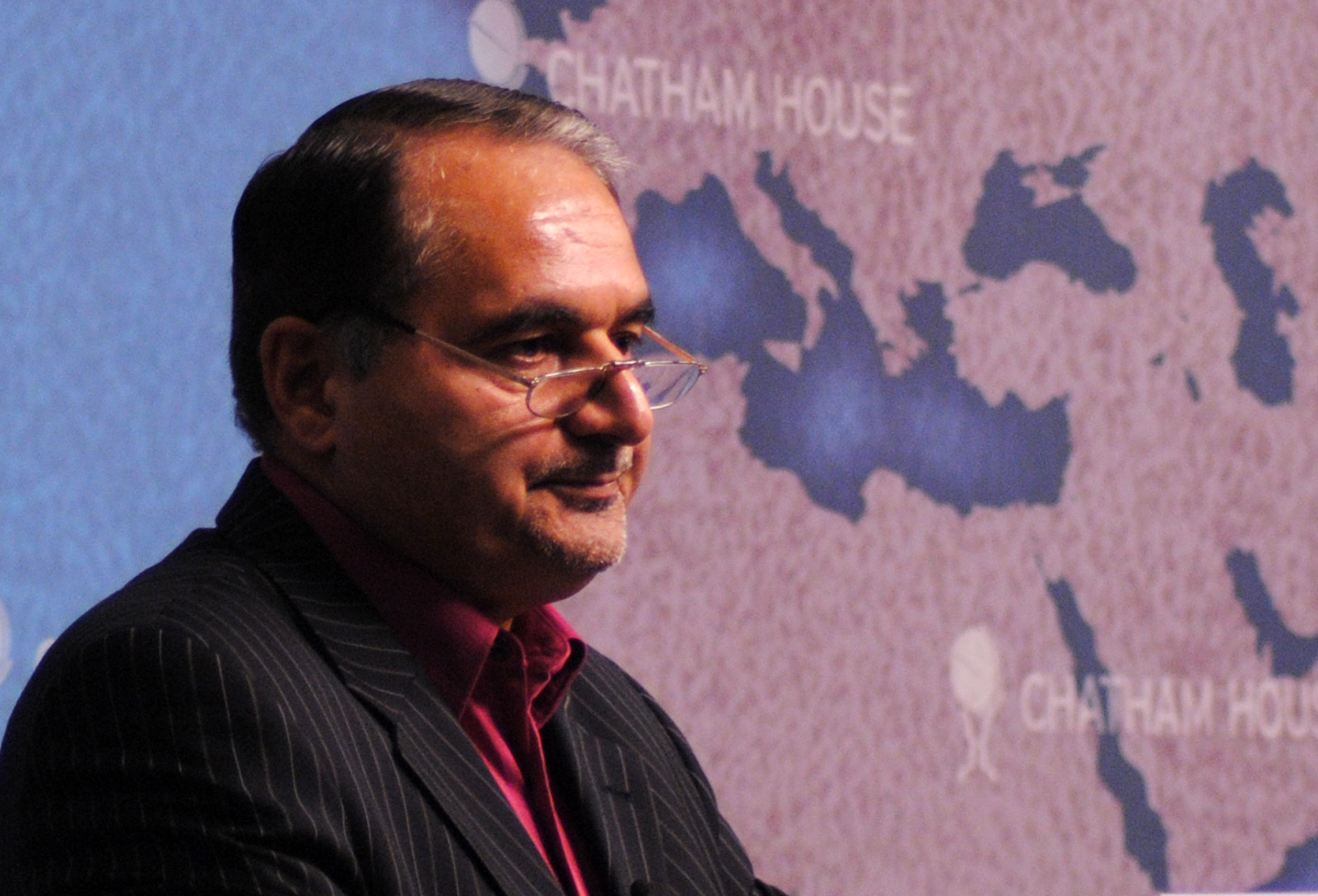
Nuclear Iran: Negotiating a Way Out.

== Iranian Nuclear Crisis: A Memoir ==
Reviewing Mousavian's 2012 book, Iranian Nuclear Crisis: A Memoir in the Wall Street Journal, Sohrab Ahmari said that although the book “is billed as a memoir,” it is more of “a diplomatic brief, complete with awkward bureaucratic prose and key sections stippled by bullet points.” Ahmari drew attention to “the endnotes, where an editor felt obliged to acknowledge where the author parts company with the public record,” as in an assertion that Iran had fully disclosed the details of its nuclear activities to the IAEA.

== Bibliography ==
- Imam Khomeini: His Life and Leadership, 1990, Saffron Publications, London, UK
- Islamic Thinkers of Germany, 1995, Institute for Political and International Studies (IPIS), Iranian Foreign Ministry
- Challenges of Iran-West Relations; Analysis of Iran-Germany Relations, 2006, The Center for Strategic Research
- Iran-Europe Relations: Challenges and Opportunities, 2008, Routledge Press, London, UK
- Additional Protocol and Islamic Republic’s Strategy, 2008, The Center for Strategic Research
- Human Rights: Trends and Viewpoints, 2008, The Center for Strategic Research
- The Iranian Nuclear Crisis: A Memoir, 2012, Carnegie Endowment for International Peace
- Iran and the United States, An Insider’s View on the Failed Past and the Road to Peace, Co-authored with Shahir Shahidsaless, 2014, Bloomsbery

=== Critical studies and reviews of Mousavian's work ===
Iran and the United States

- Shrivastava, Claudia (Spring–Summer 2016). "An insider's view". Book Reviews. Journal of International Affairs. 69 (2): 211–212.
