= Leo Szilard Lectureship Award =

- Date: 1974
- Presented by: American Physical Society
- Website: https://www.aps.org/programs/honors/prizes/szilard.cfm

The Leo Szilard Lectureship Award (originally called the Leo Szilard Award) is given annually by the American Physical Society (APS) for "outstanding accomplishments by physicists in promoting the use of physics for the benefit of society". It is given internationally in commemoration of physicist Leo Szilard.

"In the year's of Szilard's life and activity it became clearer than ever before how great the responsibility of scientists is to the society. And, to a large extent, it is due to Szilard that this awareness began to spread in the scientific community." - Andrei Sakharov

It is often awarded to physicists early in their careers who are active in areas such as environmental issues, arms control, or science policy. As of 2015 the recipient is given $3,000 plus $2,000 travel expenses and is expected to lecture at an APS meeting and at educational or research laboratories, to promote awareness of their activities.

== Recipients ==
The award is given yearly and was first presented in 1974.

- 1974 David R. Inglis
- 1975 Bernard T. Feld
- 1976 Richard Garwin
- 1977 not awarded
- 1978 Matthew Meselson
- 1979 Sherwood Rowland
- 1980 Sidney Drell
- 1981 Henry Way Kendall, Hans Bethe
- 1982 Wolfgang K. H. Panofsky
- 1983 Andrei Sakharov
- 1984 Kosta Tsipis
- 1985 James B. Pollack, O. Brian Toon, Thomas P. Ackerman, Richard P. Turco, Carl Sagan, John W. Birks, Paul J. Crutzen
- 1986 Arthur Rosenfeld
- 1987 Thomas B. Cochran
- 1988 Robert H. Williams
- 1989 Anthony Nero
- 1990 Theodore Postol
- 1991 John H. Gibbons
- 1992 Kurt Gottfried
- 1993 Ray Kidder, Roy Woodruff
- 1994 Herbert York
- 1995 Evgeny Velikhov, Roald Sagdeev
- 1996 David Hafemeister
- 1997 Thomas L. Neff
- 1998 David Baird Goldstein, Howard Geller
- 1999 John Alexander Simpson
- 2000 Jeremiah David Sullivan
- 2001 John Harte
- 2002 Henry C. Kelly
- 2003 Robert H. Socolow
- 2004 Marc Ross
- 2005 David K. Barton, Roger Falcone, Daniel Kleppner, Frederick K. Lamb, Ming K. Lau, Harvey L. Lynch, David Moncton, David Montague, David E. Mosher, William Priedhorsky, Maury Tigner, David R. Vaughan
- 2006 Paul G. Richards
- 2007 James E. Hansen
- 2008 Anatoli Diyakov, Pavel Podvig
- 2009 Raymond Jeanloz
- 2010 Frank von Hippel
- 2011 John F. Ahearne
- 2012 Siegfried Hecker
- 2013 Geoffrey West
- 2014 M. V. Ramana, Ramamurti Rajaraman
- 2015 Ashok Gadgil
- 2016 Joel Primack
- 2017 James Timbie
- 2018 Edwin Stuart Lyman
- 2019 Zia Mian
- 2020 France A. Córdova
- 2021 Steve Fetter
- 2022 Michael E. Mann
- 2023 Laura Grego

== See also ==
- David Adler Lectureship Award in the Field of Materials Physics
- List of physics awards
