= Li Bin (physicist) =

Li Bin is a senior associate working jointly in the Nuclear Policy Program and Asia Program at the Carnegie Endowment for International Peace. He is a physicist with an interest in nuclear disarmament, and his research focuses on China’s nuclear and arms control policy and U.S.-China nuclear relations. Previously, Li Bin was a professor of international relations at Tsinghua University, where he was the founding director of the Arms Control Program at the Institute of International Studies. He has also directed the arms control division at the Institute of Applied Physics and Computational Mathematics. Li Bin was a MacArthur Foundation Peace and Security Fellow at the Massachusetts Institute of Technology and Princeton University.

Li Bin is the author of Arms Control Theories and Analysis and co-editor of Strategy and Security: A Technical View, and he has also published in numerous academic journals, including the Bulletin of the Atomic Scientists, Arms Control Today, and Science & Global Security. Bin is a member of the board of directors of the China Arms Control and Disarmament Association and the U.S.-China Peoples Friendship Association. He also serves on the boards of several international journals, including Science & Global Security, Nonproliferation Review, and China Security.

== See also ==
- Frank N. von Hippel
- Mycle Schneider
- M.V. Ramana
- International Panel on Fissile Materials
