= Li Bin =

Li Bin is the name of the following Chinese people:

- Li Bin (Ming dynasty) (died 1422), Ming dynasty general
- Li Bin (politician) (born 1954), politician
- Li Bin (diplomat) (born 1956), diplomat
- William Li or Li Bin (born 1974), founder of electric car company NIO
- Li Bin (water polo) (born 1983), water polo player
- Li Bin (footballer) (born 1991), footballer
- Li Bin (physicist), scientist
