= Roger W. Jeanloz =

Swiss biochemist

Roger William Jeanloz
- Born: 3 November 1917; Bern, Switzerland
- Died: 28 September 2007 (aged 89); Cagnes-sur-Mer, France
- Occupations: Biochemist, Professor
- Known for: Research in glycobiology founding Laboratory for Carbohydrate Research at Massachusetts General Hospital

Roger William Jeanloz (3 November 1917 – 28 September 2007) was a Swiss-American biochemist.

== Life ==
Jeanloz was born in Bern, Switzerland, on 3 November 1917, and grew up in Geneva. His father was of Swiss German descent, and his mother had French ancestry. Jeanloz attended Collège Calvin, where he pursued Greek and Latin classical studies, graduating with a bachelor's of science in 1936. Five years later, Jeanloz completed a diploma in chemical engineering from the University of Geneva, specializing in organic chemistry and biochemistry. In 1943, Jeanloz obtained a D.Sc under the direction of Kurt Heinrich Meyer. Jeanloz worked for Tadeusz Reichstein from 1944 to 1946, when he moved his postdoctoral research overseas, with a year each at the University of Montreal in Canada and National Institutes of Health in the United States. After a three-year stint at the Worcester Foundation for Experimental Biology, during which he also taught at Tufts Medical School, Jeanloz joined the faculty of Harvard Medical School in 1951, while accepting a concurrent position at Massachusetts General Hospital. In 1961, Jeanloz was named head of the Laboratory for Carbohydrate Research at Mass General, and as an undergraduate adviser at Harvard College. He was a co-founding regional editor of the journal Carbohydrate Research, which published its first issue in 1965. Harvard Medical School appointed Jeanloz a professor of biological chemistry and molecular pharmacology in 1969, and granted him emeritus status in 1988. He remained an adviser and tutor at Harvard College until 2007.

Over the course of his career, Jeanloz was honored with the Claude S. Hudson Award by the American Chemical Society, a Humboldt Research Award, and a Guggenheim fellowship. He died of pneumonia on 28 September 2007, while on vacation in Cagnes-sur-Mer, France. Jeanloz was married to Dorothea, with whom he had four children: sons Claude and Raymond, and daughters Danielle and Sylvie.
