= Jawayd Bhutto =

Pakistani philosopher and professor (1954–2019)

- جاويد ڀٽو
- Born: June 1, 1954; Shikarpur, Sindh, Pakistan
- Died: March 1, 2019 (aged 64); Washington, D.C., United States
- Education: Doctor of Philosophy
- Alma mater: Sofia University, Bulgaria
- Occupations: Professor, philosopher
- Writing career
- Subject: Philosophy
- Movement: Progressive

Jawayd Bhutto (Sindhi: جاويد ڀٽو) was a Sindhi philosopher and professor. He was killed on 1 March 2019 in Washington, D.C. after a dispute with a neighbor.

== Education ==
Bhutto received primary and secondary education at his hometown Shikarpur, Sindh. He subsequently enrolled at Bolan University of Medical & Health Sciences for a Bachelor of Medicine, Bachelor of Surgery degree, but discontinued and studied philosophy at University of Karachi in 1980. After his masters he went to Sofia University Bulgaria to pursue a PhD in philosophy.

== Professional career ==
He was an assistant professor and chairman of philosophy department at University of Sindh.

== Activism ==
Bhutto started activism after his sister Fozia Bhutto's murder by an influential politician.

Bhutto was the husband of journalist Nafisa Hoodbhoy and brother-in-law of physicist Pervez Hoodbhoy.

== Death ==
Bhutto was shot dead on 1 March 2019 outside a convenience store in Washington, United States, by a neighbor, who was a heavy drinker and was often very rowdy and noisy. Bhutto had recently lodged a complaint against him with the building landlord. He was buried in his ancestral graveyard in Shikarpur district.
