= Eqbal Ahmad =

Pakistani political scientist (1933–1999)

- اقبال احمد
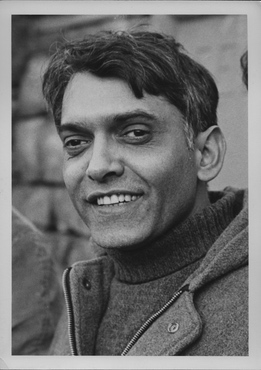
- Born: Eqbal Ahmad; 1 January 1933; Gaya, Bihar and Orissa Province, British India
- Died: 11 May 1999 (aged 66); Islamabad, Pakistan
- Spouse: Julie Diamond
- Children: 1

Academic background
- Education: Forman Christian College; Occidental College; Princeton University
- Influences: Karl Marx, Allama Iqbal, Jinnah, and Edward Said

Academic work
- Discipline: Middle Eastern studies Eastern Philosophy
- Sub-discipline: Postcolonialism postmodernism
- Institutions: Cornell University; University of Chicago; Hampshire College
- Notable works: Political Science; Anti-war movement
- Influenced: Edward Said, Noam Chomsky, Howard Zinn, Ibrahim Abu-Lughod, Richard Falk, Pervez Hoodbhoy, Alexander Cockburn, and Arundhati Roy
- Military career
- Allegiance: Pakistan
- Branch: Pakistan Army
- Service years: First Kashmir War
- Rank: Second Lieutenant

Eqbal Ahmad (Note: Urdu: اقبال احمد) (1933 – 11 May 1999) was a Pakistani political scientist, writer and academic known for his anti-war activism, his support for resistance movements globally and academic contributions to the study of the Near East. Born in Bihar and Orissa Province, British India, Ahmad migrated to Pakistan during the Partition of India and went on to study economics at the Forman Christian College. After graduating, he worked briefly as an army officer and was wounded in the First Kashmir War in 1948. He participated in the Algerian Revolution, then studied the Vietnam War and U.S. imperialism, becoming an early opponent of the war upon his return to the U.S. in the mid-1960s.

While highly regarded in radical circles of South Asia and left-wing circles more generally, Ahmad was a controversial figure. According to Pervez Hoodbhoy, warrants of arrest and death sentences were put on him during successive martial law governments in Pakistan. Although he was indicted in 1971 on charges of conspiring to kidnap Henry Kissinger (who was then President Nixon's National Security Advisor), the case was eventually dismissed. Kabir Babar called Ahmad "one of the most outstanding thinkers ever to originate from the Subcontinent. His analyses of the major political events and trends of the 20th century were noted for their astuteness and predictive power." Edward Said listed Ahmad as one of the two most important influences on his intellectual development, praising the latter's writings on South Asia especially as informative.

== Early life and education ==
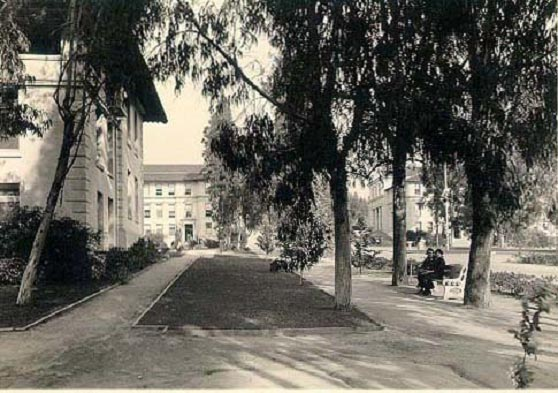
Ahmad spent a year studying American history at Occidental College.

Eqbal Ahmad was born in the village of Irki in the Bihar and Orissa Province of British India in 1933, to a family of Indian Muslim landowners. When he was a young boy, his father was murdered over a land dispute in his presence. During the partition of India in 1947, he and his elder brother migrated to Pakistan on foot. During the journey, Ahmad lost contact with his family in New Delhi and fled to Lahore carrying a gun.

Ahmad graduated from Lahore's Forman Christian College in 1951 with a degree in economics. After serving briefly as an army officer, he enrolled at Occidental College in California in 1957, as a Rotary Fellow. In 1958, he went to Princeton University, where he studied political science and Middle Eastern history until earning his PhD in 1965.

During his time at Princeton, Ahmad travelled to Tunisia and Algeria as part of his doctoral dissertation. In Algiers, he supported the Algerian Revolution, leading to his subsequent arrest in France. Ahmad went on to teach at the University of Illinois and at Cornell University until 1968. During this time, Ahmad also became a prominent fellow of the anti-war Institute for Policy Studies.

His vocal support of Palestinian rights during the 1967 war led to his isolation within the academic community, causing him to leave Cornell. From 1968 to 1972, he worked as a fellow at the University of Chicago. During this time, Ahmad became a prominent activist opposing the Vietnam War, which lead to his being charged as part of the Harrisburg Seven in January 1971. After the trial Ahmad was acquitted of all charges in 1972. He moved to Amsterdam in 1973. In 1974, he founded and directed the Transnational Institute, until 1975. In 1982, he moved back to the United States and joined Hampshire College as a tenured professor and taught there until becoming Professor Emeritus in 1997.

In 1990, he began splitting his time between Islamabad and Amherst and also began writing for Dawn, and worked unsuccessfully to establish a liberal arts college named after Ibn Khaldun in Islamabad. Ahmad was one of the most prominent left-wing academics in both Pakistan and the United States. His legacy is that of strong opposition to militarism, bureaucracy, nuclear arms and ideological rigidity, while also strongly supporting democracy and self-determination. Even though a little-known figure within Pakistan, Ahmad's legacy in intellectual circles is strong both within the country and outside it.

== Career ==
From 1960 to 1963, Ahmad lived in North Africa, working primarily in Algeria, where he joined the National Liberation Front and worked with Frantz Fanon and some Algerian nationalists who were fighting a war of liberation against the French in Algeria. He was offered an opportunity to join the first independent Algerian government, but refused in favour of life as an independent intellectual. Instead, he returned to the United States. Eqbal Ahmad was fluent in Urdu, English, Persian and Arabic.

When he returned to the United States, Eqbal Ahmad taught at the University of Illinois at Chicago (1964–65) and Cornell University in the school of Labor Relations (1965–68). Palestinian right of return during the Arab-Israeli war of 1967 led to his isolation within the academic community, causing him to leave Cornell. From 1968 to 1972, he worked as a fellow at the University of Chicago and the Adlai Stevenson Institute in Chicago. In 1971, Eqbal Ahmad was indicted as one of the Harrisburg Seven as a result of his activism against the Vietnam War alongside the anti-war Catholic priest Philip Berrigan, Berrigan's future wife, Sister Elizabeth McAlister, and four other Catholic pacifists, on charges of conspiracy to kidnap Henry Kissinger. After fifty-nine hours of deliberations, the jury declared a mistrial and Ahmad was acquitted of all charges in 1972. During these years, he became known as one of the earliest and most vocal opponents of American policies in Vietnam and Cambodia.

Eqbal Ahmad's friend, author Stuart Schaar, suggested in a book on Eqbal Ahmad that he had warned the US against attacking Iraq in 1990. He had correctly predicted that Saddam's fall would bring in sectarian violence and chaos in the region. Eqbal Ahmad had also interviewed Osama bin Laden in Peshawar in 1986. In the early 1990s, he had predicted that, considering the ideology of Osama Bin Laden, he would eventually turn against US and Pakistan, his then allies.

From 1972 to 1982, Ahmad was Senior Fellow at the Institute for Policy Studies. From 1973 to 1975, he served as the first director of its overseas affiliate, the Transnational Institute in Amsterdam. In 1982, Ahmad joined the faculty at Hampshire College, in Amherst, Massachusetts, a progressive school which was the first college in the nation to divest from South Africa. There, he taught world politics and political science. In the early 1990s, Ahmad was granted a parcel of land in Pakistan by Prime Minister Nawaz Sharif's government, to build an independent, alternative university, named Khaldunia University.

Upon his retirement from Hampshire in 1997, he settled permanently in Pakistan, where he continued to write a weekly column, for Dawn, Pakistan's oldest English-language newspaper. He continued to promote Scandinavian-style social democracy for Muslim countries to limit extremism, poverty and injustice.

Eqbal Ahmad was the founding chancellor of the then newly established Textile Institute of Pakistan, a textile-oriented science, design and business-degree-awarding institute. The institute professes to be driven by the values Eqbal Ahmad stood for and awards its most prestigious honour, the Dr. Eqbal Ahmed Achievement Award, to the graduate who most reflects Eqbal Ahmad's values as unanimously chosen by the faculty at its annual convocation.

== Death and legacy ==
Eqbal Ahmad died of heart failure on 11 May 1999 at an Islamabad hospital in Pakistan, where he was being treated for colon cancer. He had married Julie Diamond in 1969, a teacher and a writer from New York and they had one daughter, Dohra.

Since his death, a memorial lecture series has been established at Hampshire College in his honour. Speakers have included Kofi Annan, Edward Said, Noam Chomsky, and Arundhati Roy. Ahmad was admired as "an intellectual unintimidated by power or authority". He collaborated with such left-wing journalists, activists, and thinkers as Chomsky, Said, Howard Zinn, Ibrahim Abu-Lughod, Richard Falk, Fredric Jameson, Alexander Cockburn and Daniel Berrigan. Ahmad influenced several left-leaning activists including Chomsky, Zinn, Abu-Lughod, Richard Falk, Pervez Hoodbhoy, Cockburn, Said and Roy. Ahmad is credited for his insight into Islamic terrorism; he publicly criticised global support for the Islamic fundamentalist groups in Afghanistan.

Noam Chomsky in an article, after Ahmad's death in 1999, described Ahmad as a "treasured friend, trusted comrade, counsellor and teacher" and said that Ahmad describes with warmth and feeling the Islamic Sufi tradition that he remembers from his childhood in a village in Bihar, where Islamic Sufi admiration among the public united Hindus and Muslims. Simple and unpretentious, 'they preached by example', living 'by service and by setting an example of treating people equally without discrimination'. The Sufis appealed to the most oppressed, offering 'social mobility, as well as dignity and equality to the poor'. Sufis regarded the idea of nationalism as an anti-Islamic ideology that 'proceeds to create boundaries where Islam is a faith without national boundaries. Eqbal Ahmad describes himself as a 'harshly secular' person and an 'internationalist' but he was quick to praise elements of religious thought and practice that he found admirable among the Islamic Sufis.

Eqbal Ahmad saw Islam as concerned, above all, with the welfare of common people. Eqbal's leftism was his humanity and this only reinforced the pride he took in being a Pakistani in a challenging time.

[Ahmad was] perhaps the shrewdest and most original anti-imperialist analyst of the post-war world, especially in the dynamics between the West and the post-colonial states of Asia and Africa.

— Edward Said

In a review of The Selected Writings of Eqbal Ahmad, Keally McBride praises "his uncanny sense of human nature, and his encyclopedic knowledge of world history". Kabir Babar wrote that "to study him is to be exposed to the rare phenomenon of academic rigour coupled to a will to act." Shahid Alam of Monthly Review wrote that "Ahmad provided the most articulate, analytical, and passionate voice from the third world since Frantz Fanon. Almost certainly, he is also the most astute political thinker the Islamic world produced in the twentieth century."

He was a left-wing secularist, known for his lifelong denunciation and critiques of Western imperialism. Amitava Kumar argued, "As much as Said, he was a mentor to a generation of thinkers, mostly South Asian [...] notable for "not only the power but also the wide range of his sympathies [...] He was a committed engineer of emancipation, building imaginative roads, linking issues across continents." He found some aspects of Ahmad's analysis less relevant in the 21st century but still praised "his commitment to resolving political problems through diplomacy, not war. His writing on the Muslim world in particular was notable for its critical vigilance and integrity, its resistance to received wisdom." Irfan Husain wrote in Dawn that Ahmad was too biased in favor of the Palestinians in the Israeli-Palestinian conflict but also stated, "Perhaps his most precious gift was his ability to listen to others in a way most of us don't: he would pay young students the same courtesy of carefully following their argument that he would extend to the rich and powerful." Muhammad Idrees Ahmad wrote in 2016, "He accurately predicted the consequences of western recklessness in Afghanistan, and his warnings on US intervention in Iraq would prove prophetic."

== See also ==
- List of Pakistani journalists
- List of peace activists
