= Raymond Jeanloz =

American space and exotic matter physicist

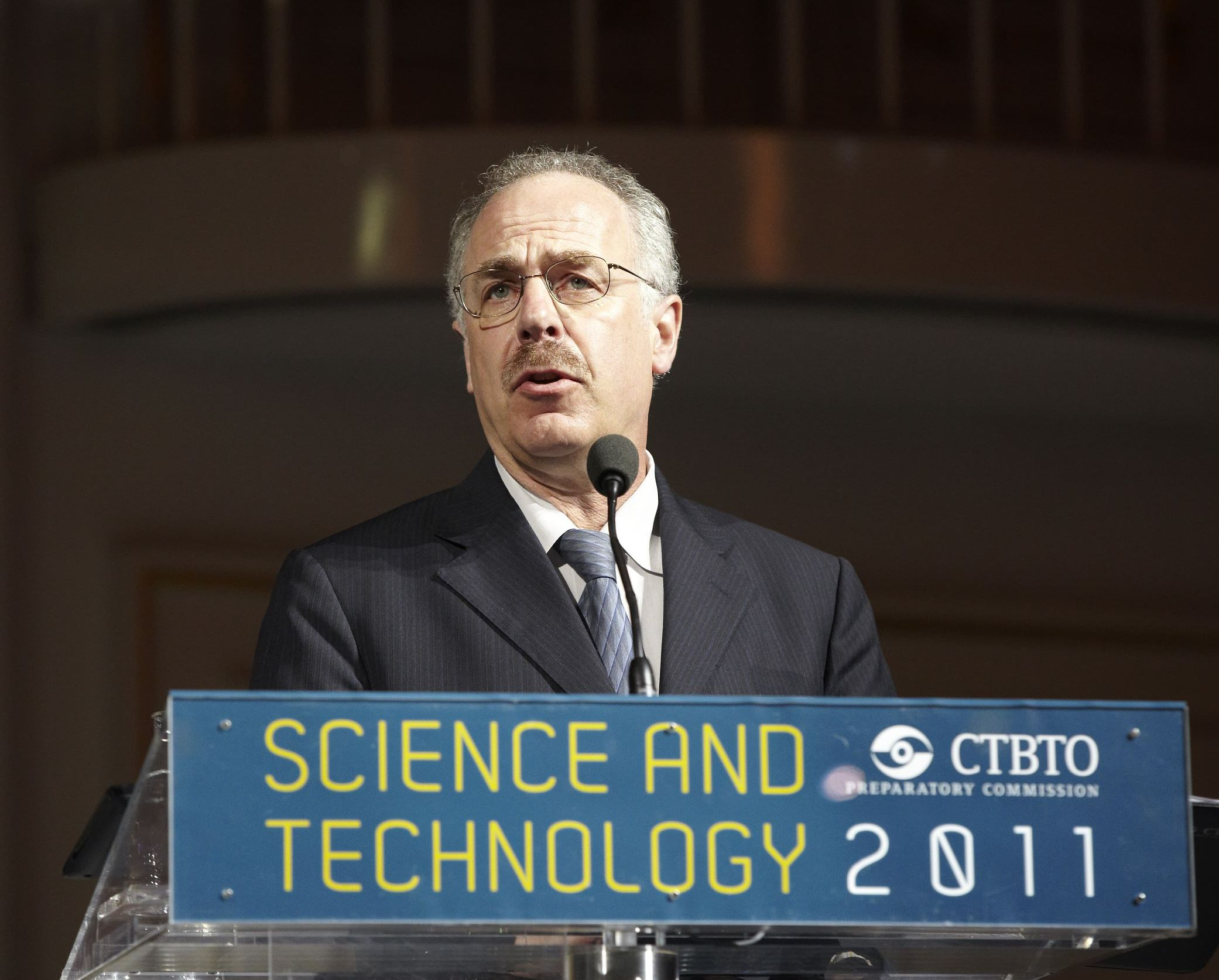
Jeanloz in 2011

Raymond Jeanloz is a professor of Earth and planetary science (EPS) and Astronomy at the University of California, Berkeley. Educated at the California Institute of Technology, Amherst College and at Deep Springs College, his research contributions have been fundamental to understanding of the composition of the Earth and the behavior of materials under high temperatures and pressures. Jeanloz has created tools and experiments that enable him to recreate and study deep interior conditions in a laboratory setting, He is working with colleagues to investigate the conditions inside supergiant exoplanets.

Jeanloz has chaired the National Research Council Board on Earth Sciences and Resources. He is a co-editor of the Annual Review of Earth and Planetary Sciences and serves on the Board of Directors of Annual Reviews.

Jeanloz is also active in connecting science and policy in areas including international policy, resources and the environment, and science education. He has been particularly prominent in informing national and international security and nuclear weapons policy, chairing the Committee on International Security and Arms Control at the National Academy of Sciences. In 2009 he received the Leo Szilard Lectureship Award from the American Physical Society for "contributions to development of sound public policy for nuclear weapons management and nuclear non-proliferation." Jeanloz became an Annenberg Distinguished Visiting Fellow at Stanford University's Hoover Institution in 2012.

== Education ==
Raymond Jeanloz is one of four children of Roger W. Jeanloz, a professor in biological chemistry and molecular pharmacology at Harvard Medical School, and his wife Dorothea. Raymond Jeanloz grew up in Massachusetts and spent two years at Deep Springs College, located in the Deep Springs Valley between the White Mountains and Inyo Mountains in California. His initial interests were in comparative literature and music. While he had some early exposure to geology, his interest in that field developed late in his undergraduate program. Having also tried Hampshire College and taken a "gap period" of several months, Jeanloz completed his B.A. in geology at Amherst College in Massachusetts in 1975.

Jeanloz applied to the California Institute of Technology (Caltech) in part because of the Caltech Seismological Laboratory. His thesis advisor at Caltech was Thomas J. Ahrens. Jeanloz credits Ahrens and others for their mentorship and support, in helping him to learn about areas where he lacked scientific background and in encouraging him to explore new areas of research. In 1979, Jeanloz received his Ph.D. from Caltech for the thesis Physics of mantle and core minerals (1979).

== Career ==
Jeanloz joined the faculty at Harvard University in 1979, working at the intersection of materials science and physics. He taught there until 1981. In 1982, he moved to the University of California, Berkeley where he became a professor of Earth and planetary science and of Astronomy.

Jeanloz is a member of the National Academy of Sciences. He advises the US Government, the University of California and its national laboratories on a wide variety of issues including national security. He has chaired the Committee on International Security and Arms Control, and has been recognized by the Federation of American Scientists and the American Physical Society for shaping government policy.

== Research ==
Jeanloz was an early researcher in mineral physics, and was one of those who proposed the field for recognition by the American Geophysical Union (AGU). His work has connected mineral physics, chemistry, and materials science.

Nowadays, when people ask me, "What should I do?" I say, "Consider at least one possibility is to create a new field." – Raymond Jeanloz

Jeanloz studies processes that occur under high temperatures and pressures, conditions that are characteristic of the interiors of planets and the core-mantle boundary of the Earth. Jeanloz studies planetary interiors and the properties of materials at high pressures to characterize the processes by which planets evolve over geological time periods. In the interiors of planets, pressure on materials can be millions of times higher than those at the Earth's surface and materials can behave in very different ways. Jeanloz has examined the properties and state equations of materials including alkali halides, alkaline-earth monoxides, silicate perovskite and iron.

Jeanloz has created tools and experiments that enable him to recreate and study deep interior conditions in a laboratory setting, often by generating extremely high pressure in tiny amounts. He and his students have created new materials that can only be synthesized at extreme pressures, including ultra-hard diamond-like substances. He has used diamond tips to simulate compression, creating diamond anvil cells capable of producing 4 to 5 million atmospheres, comparable to the pressures found at the center of the Earth. He has created impact waves by shooting projectiles at high speeds, and generated high-energy laser pulses. He has furthered the use of techniques for shock-loading, deformation, spectroscopy, and phase equilibria. By combining dynamic laser-induced shock waves and static diamond anvils, Jeanloz has found ways to study the behavior of materials at pressures that could range from millions to billions of atmospheres. This allows scientists to simulate conditions within giant and supergiant planets.

His research has led to greater understanding of how planets form, the composition of their interiors, and how those interiors behave. His research group is best known for experiments documenting that bridgmanite, a high-pressure form of (Mg,Fe)SiO_{3}, is the primary material making up Earth's interior. He and his colleagues provided the first experimental determination of the temperature at Earth's center, concluding that it is as hot as the Sun's surface. They also found evidence for chemical reactions between the rocky mantle and metallic core, likely making the core-mantle boundary one of Earth's most dynamic regions.

Jeanloz' group and their collaborators have modeled processes of diamond formation, indicating that diamonds may be hailing inside "icy" giant planets like Neptune. They have helped characterize the primary constituents of giant planets and stars, the high-pressure fluid-metal forms of hydrogen and helium. They have determined that helium and hydrogen can form a metallic liquid alloy at the extreme pressures that occur at the cores of Jupiter and Saturn. They have studied pressurized hydrogen and documented an insulator-to-metal transition in fluid hydrogen, identifying the conditions under which it turns into a metal. Their research also suggests that helium separates out of fluid metallic hydrogen inside Jupiter and Saturn, creating an immiscibility region in Jupiter and a four-layered planetary structure.

In another collaboration Jeanloz has studied the behavior of a novel superionic form of water ice, one that is simultaneously liquid and solid and can conduct electricity as if it was a metal. The mantles of ice giant planets like Uranus and Neptune may contain superionic ice, possibly explaining some odd behaviors of their magnetic fields. His group's experiments have also pioneered the discovery of crystal instabilities causing strain-induced amorphization and fracture-like processes, leading to new insights on how materials break.

== Awards and honors ==
- 1984, James B. Macelwane Medal, American Geophysical Union
- 1988, MacArthur Fellow, MacArthur Foundation
- 1988, Mineralogical Society of America Award (and Life Fellow), Mineralogical Society of America
- 1990, Fellow, American Association for the Advancement of Science
- 1992, Fellow, American Academy of Arts and Sciences
- 1992, Miller Professor, Miller Institute, University of California Berkeley
- 2004, Member, National Academy of Sciences, Geology Section.
- 2008, Cozzarelli Prize, National Academy of Sciences
- 2008, Hans Bethe Award, Federation of American Scientists
- 2009, Leo Szilard Lectureship Award, American Physical Society for "contributions to development of sound public policy for nuclear weapons management and nuclear non-proliferation."
- 2011-2016, Miller Senior Fellow, Miller Institute, University of California Berkeley
- 2012-2013, Annenberg Distinguished Visiting Fellow in Environmental Policy and International Security, Hoover Institution, Stanford University

== Selected publications ==
=== Materials science and physics ===
- Jeanloz, Raymond; Thompson, Alan B. (February 1983). "Phase transitions and mantle discontinuities". Reviews of Geophysics. 21 (1): 51–74. Bibcode:1983RvGSP..21...51J. doi:10.1029/RG021i001p00051. ISSN 8755-1209.
- Heinz, Dion L.; Jeanloz, Raymond (15 February 1984). "The equation of state of the gold calibration standard". Journal of Applied Physics. 55 (4): 885–893. Bibcode:1984JAP....55..885H. doi:10.1063/1.333139.
- Knittle, Elise; Jeanloz, Raymond (6 February 1987). "Synthesis and Equation of State of (Mg,Fe) SiO 3 Perovskite to Over 100 Gigapascals". Science. 235 (4789): 668–670. Bibcode:1987Sci...235..668K. doi:10.1126/science.235.4789.668. PMID 17833627.
- Williams, Quentin; Jeanloz, Raymond; Bass, Jay; Svendsen, Bob; Ahrens, Thomas J. (10 April 1987). "The Melting Curve of Iron to 250 Gigapascals: A Constraint on the Temperature at Earth's Center". Science. 236 (4798): 181–182. Bibcode:1987Sci...236..181W. doi:10.1126/science.236.4798.181. PMID 17789782.
- Williams, Quentin; Jeanloz, Raymond (19 February 1988). "Spectroscopic Evidence for Pressure-Induced Coordination Changes in Silicate Glasses and Melts". Science. 239 (4842): 902–905. Bibcode:1988Sci...239..902W. doi:10.1126/science.239.4842.902. PMID 17759037.
- Knittle, Elise; Wentzcovitch, Renata M.; Jeanloz, Raymond; Cohen, Marvin L. (January 1989). "Experimental and theoretical equation of state of cubic boron nitride". Nature. 337 (6205): 349–352. Bibcode:1989Natur.337..349K. doi:10.1038/337349a0. ISSN 1476-4687.
- Kruger, M. B.; Jeanloz, Raymond (10 August 1990). "Memory Glass: An Amorphous Material Formed from AlPO 4". Science. 249 (4969): 647–649. Bibcode:1990Sci...249..647K. doi:10.1126/science.249.4969.647. PMID 17831956.
- Jeanloz, Raymond (May 1990). "The nature of the Earth's core". Annual Review of Earth and Planetary Sciences. 18 (1): 357–386. Bibcode:1990AREPS..18..357J. doi:10.1146/annurev.ea.18.050190.002041. ISSN 0084-6597.
- Knittle, Elise; Jeanloz, Raymond (22 March 1991). "Earth's Core-Mantle Boundary: Results of Experiments at High Pressures and Temperatures". Science. 251 (5000): 1438–1443. Bibcode:1991Sci...251.1438K. doi:10.1126/science.251.5000.1438. PMID 17779437.
- Jeanloz, Raymond; Lay, Thorne (2005). "The Core-Mantle Boundary" (PDF). Scientific American. 15 (2): 36–43. doi:10.1038/scientificamerican0705-36sp.
- Meade, Charles; Jeanloz, Raymond (5 April 1991). "Deep-Focus Earthquakes and Recycling of Water into the Earth's Mantle". Science. 252 (5002): 68–72. Bibcode:1991Sci...252...68M. doi:10.1126/science.252.5002.68. PMID 17739075.
- Buffett, Bruce A.; Garnero, Edward J.; Jeanloz, Raymond (17 November 2000). "Sediments at the Top of Earth's Core". Science. 290 (5495): 1338–1342. Bibcode:2000Sci...290.1338B. doi:10.1126/science.290.5495.1338. PMID 11082058.
- Stixrude, Lars; Jeanloz, Raymond (12 August 2008). "Fluid helium at conditions of giant planetary interiors". Proceedings of the National Academy of Sciences. 105 (32): 11071–11075. doi:10.1073/pnas.0804609105. PMC 2497461.
- Smith, R. F.; Eggert, J. H.; Jeanloz, R.; Duffy, T. S.; Braun, D. G.; Patterson, J. R.; Rudd, R. E.; Biener, J.; Lazicki, A. E.; Hamza, A. V.; Wang, J.; Braun, T.; Benedict, L. X.; Celliers, P. M.; Collins, G. W. (July 2014). "Ramp compression of diamond to five terapascals". Nature. 511 (7509): 330–333. Bibcode:2014Natur.511..330S. doi:10.1038/nature13526. PMID 25030170.
- Millot, Marius; Hamel, Sebastien; Rygg, J. Ryan; Celliers, Peter M.; Collins, Gilbert W.; Coppari, Federica; Fratanduono, Dayne E.; Jeanloz, Raymond; Swift, Damian C.; Eggert, Jon H. (March 2018). "Experimental evidence for superionic water ice using shock compression". Nature Physics. 14 (3): 297–302. Bibcode:2018NatPh..14..297M. doi:10.1038/s41567-017-0017-4. ISSN 1745-2481. OSTI 1542614.
- Celliers, Peter M.; Millot, Marius; Brygoo, Stephanie; McWilliams, R. Stewart; Fratanduono, Dayne E.; Rygg, J. Ryan; Goncharov, Alexander F.; Loubeyre, Paul; Eggert, Jon H.; Peterson, J. Luc; Meezan, Nathan B.; Le Pape, Sebastien; Collins, Gilbert W.; Jeanloz, Raymond; Hemley, Russell J. (17 August 2018). "Insulator-metal transition in dense fluid deuterium" (PDF). Science. 361 (6403): 677–682. Bibcode:2018Sci...361..677C. doi:10.1126/science.aat0970. PMID 30115805.
- Brygoo, S.; Loubeyre, P.; Millot, M.; Rygg, J. R.; Celliers, P. M.; Eggert, J. H.; Jeanloz, R.; Collins, G. W. (27 May 2021). "Evidence of hydrogen−helium immiscibility at Jupiter-interior conditions". Nature. 593 (7860): 517–521. Bibcode:2021Natur.593..517B. doi:10.1038/s41586-021-03516-0. OSTI 1820549. PMID 34040210.

=== Nuclear policy ===
- Technical Issues Related to the Comprehensive Nuclear Test Ban Treaty. Washington, D.C.: National Academies Press. 1 August 2002. doi:10.17226/10471. ISBN 978-0-309-08506-9.
- Technical issues related to the Comprehensive Nuclear Test Ban Treaty. Washington, D.C.: National Academy Press. 2002. ISBN 978-0-309-08506-9.
- Monitoring nuclear weapons and nuclear-explosive materials. Washington, D.C.: National Academies Press. 2005. ISBN 0-309-09597-2.
- Effects of nuclear earth-penetrator and other weapons. Washington, D.C.: National Academies Press. 2005. ISBN 978-0-309-09673-7.
- English-Chinese, Chinese-English Nuclear Security Glossary. National Academies Press. 2008. ISBN 978-0-309-11931-3.
- Managing for high-quality science and engineering at the NNSA national security laboratories. Washington: National academies press. 2013. ISBN 978-0-309-25437-3.
- The Comprehensive Nuclear Test Ban Treaty: technical issues for the United States. Washington, DC: National Academy Pr. 2012. ISBN 978-0-309-14998-3.
