= David B. Goldstein (energy policy expert) =

American energy conservation policy expert

- Education: University of California, Berkeley
- Occupation: energy conservation policy expert
- Known for: MacArthur Fellows Program

David B. Goldstein was an American energy conservation policy expert. He co-directs the Natural Resources Defense Council's Energy Program. He currently serves as the board chair of the Institute for Market Transformation, which he co-founded in 1996 and as the board president of New Buildings Institute, for which he is also a founding director.

== Biography ==
He graduated from the University of California, Berkeley with a Ph.D. in Physics.

== Awards ==
- 2002 MacArthur Fellows Program
- Fellow of the American Physical Society
- Leo Szilard Award for Physics in the Public Interest
- 2003 California Alumni Association’s Award for Excellence in Achievement
