= The Selected Writings of Eqbal Ahmad =

- Cover
- Editors: Yogesh Chandrani; Carollee Bengelsdorf; Margaret Cerullo
- Author: Eqbal Ahmad
- Language: English
- Subject: Asian history, political history
- Publisher: Columbia University Press
- Publication date: June 20, 2006
- Media type: Print
- Pages: 664
- ISBN: 0-231-12711-1

The Selected Writings of Eqbal Ahmad is a book of selected essays and other writings by Eqbal Ahmad published in 2006. It was edited by Yogesh Chandrani, Carollee Bengelsdorf, and Margaret Cerullo, and contains a foreword by Noam Chomsky. The essays' topics include guerrilla warfare, the Cold War, the rise of Islamic fundamentalism, and the nuclear tests carried out by India and Pakistan. The collection received a number of positive reviews.

== Description ==
The Selected Writings of Eqbal Ahmad contains five parts: "Revolutionary Warfare and Counterinsurgency"; "Third World Politics: Pathologies of Power, Pathologies of Resistance"; "On the Cusp of the Cold War: Portents of a New Century"; "The Palestinian-Israeli Conflict: Colonization in the Era of Decolonization" and "South Asia". One of the views discussed by Ahmad is that a revolutionary guerilla movement should not try to outfight the enemy but rather should "outadminister" them (that is, delegitimize the enemy's authority and create institutions of governance to replace those of the enemy).

== Reviews ==
The book received a positive review from Stuart Schaar, who wrote that the section "Colonization in the Era of Decolonization" "pulls no punches. Eqbal had the rare ability to honestly criticize the faults of the movements to which he was attached [...] Selected Writings contains most of his important work and gives a good sense of his global reach and his emphasis on evaluating events in terms of what they meant for victims."

Keally McBride said that "Counterinsurgency" and "How to Tell When the Rebels Have Won" (the first and third essays in part one) "provide more insight into the current dilemmas of U.S. missions in Afghanistan, Iraq, and potential developments in Iran and North Korea than any other texts I have ever encountered." Laleh Khalili of Jadaliyya listed "“Part I: Revolutionary Warfare and Counterinsurgency,” as one of the essential readings on the subject of counterinsurgency, arguing that it "lay bare the architecture of asymmetric warfare by imperial and neo-imperial powers. Ahmad’s surgically precise skewering of 'liberal-reformist' counterinsurgency feels as fresh and cutting today as the day it was written".

Shahid Alam argued in Monthly Review that Ahmad's argument on the role of Third World countries' internal dynamics in these nations being "saddled with centralized, corrupt, and repressive states [...] is at odds with Ahmad’s insistence on the centrality of massive U.S. interventions". Alam also said the essays "“Islam and Politics" and “Roots of the Religious Right" (both in part two) have incompatible views of Islamist movements. Regardless, the reviewer still concluded, "Not only do these essays provide the big picture, but they demonstrate a grasp of details which might put specialists to shame. In this volume is contained the intellectual synopsis of an era, which would be hard to find in any other single book. Ahmad provided the most articulate, analytical, and passionate voice from the third world since Frantz Fanon."

Amitava Kumar found some aspects of Ahmad's analysis less relevant in the 21st century, saying that American and Israeli policies don't explain radical Islam co-opting the anti-imperial struggle and the failure of "Third World Marxism". Regardless, Kumar claimed, "people like Ahmad do not come along often. That is why the publication of his Selected Writings is an occasion for sorrow as well as celebration."
