= Laura Grego =

American nuclear security researcher

- Alma Mater: University of Michigan, California Institute of Technology
- Majors: Physics, Astronomy, Astrophysics
- Recognition: Fellow of the American Physical Society (2021), Leo Szilard Lectureship Award (2023)
- Known For: Senior Scientist at Union of Concerned Scientists

Laura Grego is an American physicist specializing in nuclear safety and security and space policy.

She is a senior scientist at the Union of Concerned Scientists, where she is the research director of the Global Security Program.

She is currently a Stanton Nuclear Security Fellow at MIT's Laboratory for Nuclear Security and Policy, on leave from the Union of Concerned Scientists’ Global Security Program.

She is a technical expert for The Woomera Manual on the International Law of Military Space Operations, an associate editor for the journal Science and Global Security, and has testified before the U.S. Congress and the United Nations.

She has addressed the United Nations General Assembly as well as the United Nations Conference on Disarmament on space security matters and serves as an expert source for print, radio, and television shows.

== Education and career ==
Grego graduated from the University of Michigan in 1992, with a double major in physics and astronomy. She continued studying astrophysics at the California Institute of Technology, where she completed her Ph.D. in 1999. Her dissertation research concerned the Sunyaev–Zeldovich effect and its application in calibrating the cosmic distance ladder and measuring galaxy clusters, supervised by John Carlstrom.

She was a postdoctoral researcher at the Harvard–Smithsonian Center for Astrophysics, before taking her present position at the Union of Concerned Scientists.

== Recognition ==
In 2021 Grego was named a Fellow of the American Physical Society (APS), after a nomination from the APS Forum on Physics and Society, "for producing significant, highly influential technical and policy analyses of critical issues in international security and arms control, especially in the areas of missile defense, space weapons, and space security, and for sustained activities that have engaged and educated students, colleagues, policy makers, and the public about these issues."

She was the recipient of the APS 2023 Leo Szilard Lectureship Award, "for significant, influential analyses of critical issues in international security and arms control, especially in the areas of missile defense, space weapons, and space security; for sustained activities educating students, colleagues, policymakers, and the public about these issues."
