= Fred A. Donath =

American geologist (1931–2024)

- Born: July 11, 1931; St. Cloud, Minnesota, U.S.
- Died: January 26, 2024 (aged 92); Tucson, Arizona, U.S.
- Citizenship: American
- Education: Rice University; University of Minnesota; Stanford University
- Partner: Mavis née Hagen
- Children: 2
- Scientific career
- Workplaces: San Jose State University; Columbia University; University of Illinois

Frederick Arthur Donath (July 11, 1931 – January 26, 2024) was an American geologist who specialized in research on nuclear waste disposal. He was the founding editor of the Annual Review of Earth and Planetary Sciences.

== Early life and education ==
Frederick Arthur Donath was born to Arthur C. Donath and Elizabeth née Crary in 1931 at St. Cloud Hospital in St. Cloud, Minnesota. Arthur Donath was an educator and a principal. Fred Donath grew up in Winona, Minnesota, attending Winona Senior High School where he participated in the Civil Air Patrol (CAP) and traveled to Switzerland for ten days as part of a cadet exchange. He moved to Texas to attend Rice University, though returned to Minnesota to finish his undergraduate at the University of Minnesota in 1954. He then attended Stanford University for his Master of Science in 1956 and PhD in 1958.

== Career ==
After graduating from Stanford, he worked at San Jose State University as an assistant professor of geology. In 1958 he accepted a position as an assistant professor of geology with an emphasis in structural geology at Columbia University to fill the vacancy left by the retirement of Walter Hermann Bucher. In 1962, Donath received a research grant from the National Science Foundation to establish a geophysics lab at Columbia University; he was also promoted to associate professor. He left Columbia later in the 1960s to accept a position as head of the Department of Geology at the University of Illinois; he was head of the department for eleven years until 1977, after which he remained a professor of geology. In 1978 he testified before the US Congress regarding geologic considerations in radioactive waste.

Donath was the founding editor of the Annual Review of Earth and Planetary Sciences, which was established in 1973. He was succeeded as editor by George Wetherill in 1981. In 1980, he left the University of Illinois to form his own consulting firm, CGS Inc. Later in the 1980s, he sold CGS to a California-based company, Earthtec, and started working for them as vice president for research. He then created an endowed award for young scientists with the Geological Society of America known as the Donath Medal.

== Personal life and death ==
Donath married Mavis née Hagen in 1952. He died at his home in Tucson, Arizona, on January 26, 2024, at the age of 92.
