= Ramamurti Rajaraman =

Indian scientist and academic (1939–2025)

- Rajaraman in the classroom
- Born: 11 March 1939
- Died: 12 July 2025 (aged 86)
- Education: St. Stephen's College, Delhi (BSc); Cornell University (PhD)
- Awards: 1983 Shanti Swarup Bhatnagar Prize; 2014 Leo Szilard Lectureship Award by American Physical Society
- Scientific career
- Fields: Physics
- Workplaces: Jawaharlal Nehru University
- Doctoral advisor: Hans Bethe

Ramamurti Rajaraman (11 March 1939 – 12 July 2025) was an Indian theoretical physicist who was an emeritus professor of theoretical physics at the School of Physical Sciences at Jawaharlal Nehru University. He was also the co-Chairman of the International Panel on Fissile Materials and a member of the Bulletin of the Atomic Scientists' Science and Security Board. He taught and conducted research in physics at the Indian Institute of Science, the Institute for Advanced Study at Princeton, and as a visiting professor at Stanford, Harvard, MIT, and elsewhere. He received his doctorate in theoretical physics in 1963 from Cornell University. In addition to his physics publications, Rajaraman wrote widely on topics including fissile material production in India and Pakistan and the radiological effects of nuclear weapon accidents.

== Early life and education ==
Rajaraman was brother to physicist Ramamurti Shankar. He completed his BSc from St. Stephen's College of Delhi University in 1958 and his PhD in theoretical physics from Cornell University in 1963, with Hans Bethe as his supervisor. After a brief postdoctoral stint at TIFR in 1963, he returned to Cornell to teach and continue research. In 1969, after spending two years at the Institute for Advanced Study at Princeton he returned to India, working first at Delhi University (1969–76), then Indian Institute of Science (IISc), Bangalore (1976–93), finally JNU (1994– ) where he was Emeritus Professor. He spent sabbaticals at Harvard University, MIT, Stanford University, CERN, the University of Illinois and the Institute for Advanced Study in Princeton.

== Academic and research achievements ==
A notable feature of Rajaraman's research is the diversity of the areas on which he worked. In theoretical physics his work spanning four decades (1962–2002) covers nuclear many-body theory, elementary particles, quantum field theory, soliton physics, quantum Hall effect and aspects of Statistical Mechanics. In addition, after 2000, he was deeply engaged in technical and advocative work on public policy, including global nuclear disarmament, India's civilian and military nuclear programmes and higher education. Given below is a summary of some of this work.

=== Nuclear many-body theory ===
In 1962–63, as part of his PhD thesis, Rajaraman demonstrated that the prevalent calculations of the energy of nuclear matter in powers of the Brueckner reaction matrix would not yield a convergent result. He suggested instead summing, in closed form, interactions to all orders among any given number of nucleons, thereby generating a density expansion. He also outlined a method for doing so. Subsequently, Hans Bethe converted Rajaraman's outline into a substantive theory for the three-nucleon problem in nuclear matter. These developments, summarised in the 1967 review article by Rajaraman with Bethe, eventually led to the Coupled Cluster method in Many Body theory. Subsequently, B.H.J. McKellar, Rajaraman studied the impact on of intrinsic three-body and higher many-body forces between nucleons, (as distinct from the familiar pairwise nuclear forces) on nuclear matter. Separately Rajaraman showed that nucleon-nucleon correlations suppress pion condensation in neutron stars.

=== Regge poles and particle phenomenology ===
During the 1970s, Rajaraman extended his research to include particle physics. At that time, high energy hadron scattering was being analysed using S-matrix and Regge pole techniques. Since the Froissart-Martin asymptotic bounds on hadron scattering is not applicable to Weak Interactions, Rajaraman constructed a self-consistent theory of zero-mass neutrinos and showed that ν- ν and ν- ν(bar) scattering total cross sections asymptotically become equal and approach the same constant value.

Rajaraman gave the first determination from experimental data of the value of the "Triple Pomeron Vertex" as a function of momentum transfer and also derived the consequences of the vanishing of this vertex on high energy hadron scattering. With Finkelstein, he analysed Exchange Degeneracy in inclusive reactions involving the triple-Reggeon vertex.

With S. Rai Choudhary and G. Rajasekaran, he obtained several results on deep inelastic electron scattering data being then generated at SLAC. These included (i) constraints on its Structure Functions, (ii) its relationship to purely hadronic inclusive scattering (N+N→N+ X) and (iii) discovery of a fixed pole in virtual Compton Scattering.

=== Solitons ===
Aside from his reviews and his book, Rajaraman's original results on solitons include exact soliton solutions of coupled scalar field theories and with E. Weinberg a method for quantizing Solitons with internal symmetries. In 1982, Rajaraman and the theorist John Bell, examined the curious phenomenon of quantum states with fractional fermion number, discovered theoretically by Jackiw and Rebbi and experimentally observed in polyacetylene. These findings seemed to violate common sense at first sight. Rajaraman and Bell clarified this puzzle, in a pair of papers, one addressing the problem in the continuum Dirac theory, and the other in a lattice model of polyacetylene. They showed that the missing fraction of the electron was lurking at the edges of the system, as has also been seen since then in some experiments.

=== Gauge anomalies ===
In 1985, R. Jackiw and Rajaraman showed that gauge theories with anomalies are not necessarily inconsistent, contrary to the general belief till then. They solved the Chiral Schwinger Model (CSM), which is anomalous, exactly and proved that it has a consistent and relativistically covariant spectrum. Following this Rajaraman demonstrated using Dirac's theory of Constraints that the presence of a gauge anomaly only alters the constraint structure of the theory so that although it is no longer gauge invariant, but it still remains canonically consistent and relativistic. Later, he went on extend these results to different non-abelian gauge theories in two and four dimensions, including (with Percacci) the chirally gauged Wess-Zumino-Witten model.

=== Statistical mechanics ===
Motivated by neutron-star calculations which treat the Δ(3-3 ) hadron resonance as a separate species of fermions, Rajaraman and R.F. Dashen analysed the general question of the effective elementarity of narrow resonances in hadronic ensembles. Since resonances are naturally described in the S-matrix rather than Hamiltonian formalism, this investigation relied on the S-matrix formulation of Statistical Mechanics developed by R.F. Dashen and S.K. Ma. The criteria derived by Dashen and RR, when applied to the neutron star equation of state, showed that treating the Δ(3-3 ) as an independent elementary particle was a reasonable approximation. Separately Rajaraman studied, with Dashen and Ma, the finite temperature behaviour of the Gross and Neveu model which spontaneously breaks chiral symmetry. Dashen, Ma and Rajaraman found that when temperature is turned on, however slightly, the symmetry is restored. Separately, Ma and Rajaraman gave a paedagogical explanation of when and why broken symmetries are restored by fluctuations. Another intriguing result, obtained with Raj Lakshmi was the symmetry restoration, upon quantisation, of some field theories because of zero-point energy differences.

=== Quantum Hall effect ===
Rajaraman and S. L. Sondhi constructed a bosonic field operator for composite bosons, in quantum Hall systems whose condensate yields the Laughlin states at the mean field level. In a similar vein, Rajaraman constructed field operators for Jain's flux-electron composites. He also studied different features of Bilayer quantum Hall systems. A.H. MacDonald and T. Jungwirth and Rajaraman constructed their phase diagram at filling factor of two as a function of the Zeeman coupling, the layer bias and interlayer tunnelling. They showed its ground state has a rich structure of broken symmetries including one exhibiting canted anti-ferromagnetism.

Rajaraman and PhD student Sankalpa Ghosh studied topologically non-trivial "meron" and bi-meron excitations in layer-spin for bilayer Hall systems taking into account differences in interlayer and intra-layer Coulomb energy. They also analyzed CP_{3} solitons arising in a four-component description of electrons carrying both spin and layer-spin. These solitons carry nontrivial intertwined windings of real spin and layer degrees of freedom.

=== Nuclear policy and arms control ===
Rajaraman argued against India developing nuclear weapons long before its first nuclear test at Pokhran in 1974. However even after India and Pakistan officially started building nuclear weapons in 1998, he remained engaged with the strategic community and strived for nuclear restraint and threat reduction. Accordingly, Rajaraman further educated himself on nuclear technology and policy, making repeated visits to the Princeton University Program on Science and Global Security which was headed by leader on nuclear arms control, Frank von Hippel.

Thereafter, through articles, television appearances and lectures at think tanks and universities in India and abroad, Rajaraman tried to bring clarity to nuclear issues in South Asia and at the global level. His work covered nuclear weapon accidents, civil defence, India's nuclear doctrine, minimal deterrence and anti-ballistic-missile and early warning systems. He repeatedly urged capping of India's nuclear arsenal based on technical and strategic grounds that a small arsenal would suffice to meet the requirements of the Indian government's stated doctrine of minimum deterrence. He championed nuclear de-alert agreements and other confidence building measures at track II meetings with Pakistani and Chinese colleagues. He calculated fissile material production and stocks in South Asia and analysed the prospects for FMCT. He was a proponent of India joining the Comprehensive Test ban Treaty (CTBT). He analysed in detail the ramifications of the US-India Nuclear Agreement Nuclear Deal and was an active participant in the contentious public debate surrounding its three-year negotiations (2005–08).

Rajaraman was a founding member and onetime co-chair of the International Panel on Fissile Materials, of the Council of the Pugwash Conference on Science & World Affairs, and of the Asia Pacific Leadership Network for Nuclear Non-Proliferation and Disarmament, and a member of the Science and Security Board of the Bulletin of the Atomic Scientists for six years (see ).

For his work on nuclear arms control, Rajaraman received the Leo Szilard Award given by the American Physical Society in 2014.

He also wrote on safety, security and transparency in India's nuclear energy programme, from well before the Fukushima nuclear accident. To help mitigate the contentious views on nuclear energy among the Indian public, he organised and edited a book on India's nuclear energy programme with contributors ranging from leaders of the governmental Department of Atomic Energy to anti-nuclear activists. He was a member of the Expert Committee of the Nuclear Threat Initiative (NTI) for developing their 2012 Nuclear Security Index.

=== Teaching ===
At the universities where he taught for over 50 years, Rajaraman was known for his teaching skills in physics, particularly of quantum theory. The same holds for the numerous mini-courses he gave at summer and winter schools in India and abroad, explaining new advances in theoretical physics research.

Perhaps the most widely known examples of this were his monographs on quantum solitons. A new non-perturbative approach to quantum field theory was being developed in the 1970s by quantising fluctuations around exact classical (soliton) solutions, to get extended quantum particle states with remarkable topological properties. In 1975 Rajaraman published the very first review article on these new methods in the review journal Physics Reports. Subsequently, he developed it as a book, Solitons and Instantons, published in 1982 by Elsevier North Holland. It explained in simple and coherent manner these developments as well as associated techniques of path integrals, instanton-induced vacuum tunnelling, Grassman fields, and multiple-gauge vacua. Since these methods have found applications in nuclear, particle and condensed matter physics, this book has been widely used around the world by a generation of theoretical physicists. Its translation rights were bought by the Soviet Press MIR, who published it in Russian in 1985. Subsidised copies of the book were made available to most leading physics departments in the Soviet Union and Eastern Europe.

== Death ==
Ramamurti Rajaraman died on 12 July 2025, aged 86.

== Honours and awards ==
Rajaraman was the recipient of the 2014 Leo Szilard Lectureship Award from the American Physical Society for his "efforts to promote peace and nuclear security in South Asia through extensive engagements and writings" and the Shanti Swarup Bhatnagar Prize in Physical Sciences in 1983. He was also recipient of 1989 Dr. G.P. Chatterjee Memorial Award and 1995 S.N.Bose Medal of the Indian National Science Academy.

== Fellowships/memberships ==
- Founding member (2006–present) and past Co-Chairman (2007–2014) of the International Panel on Fissile Materials
- Fellow, Indian Academy of Sciences, elected 1978
- Fellow, Indian National Science Academy, elected 1985, council member (2004–06), Vice-President (2010–12)
- Editor, PRAMANA – Indian Journal of Physics (1989–1992)
- Council member, Pugwash Conferences (2016–20??)
- Member of the Asia Pacific Leadership Network
- Member of the Science and Security Board of Bulletin of the Atomic Scientists (2012–2015; 2015–2018)
- Member, Board of Editors, Science and Global Security, (Taylor & Francis publishers, USA)
- Member, Permanent Monitoring Panel—Mitigation of Terrorist Acts, World Federation of Scientists, Erice, Italy
- Member, NTI Verification Pilot Project, Nuclear Threat Initiative, Washington DC
