= Annual Review of Earth and Planetary Sciences =

- Discipline: Earth science, planetary science
- Language: English
- Edited by: Katherine H. Freeman, Raymond Jeanloz

Publication details
- History: 1973–present, 53 years old
- Publisher: Annual Reviews
- Frequency: Annually
- Open access: Subscribe to Open
- Impact factor: 15.6 (2025)

Standard abbreviations
- ISO 4: Annu. Rev. Earth Planet. Sci.

Indexing
- CODEN: AREPCI
- ISSN: 1545-4495 (print); 0084-6597 (web)
- LCCN: 72082137
- OCLC no.: 42635458

Links
- Journal homepage

Annual Review of Earth and Planetary Sciences is an annual peer-reviewed scientific journal published by Annual Reviews (AR), which broadly covers Earth and planetary sciences, including geology, atmospheric sciences, climate, geophysics, environmental science, geological hazards, geodynamics, planet formation, and solar system origins. The co-editors are Katherine H. Freeman (Pennsylvania State University) and Raymond Jeanloz (University of California, Berkeley). As of 2023, it is being published as open access, under the Subscribe to Open model. As of 2026, Journal Citation Reports gives the journal a 2025 impact factor of 15.6.

== History ==
The Annual Review of Earth and Planetary Sciences was first published in 1973 by Annual Reviews(AR), a nonprofit organization whose stated mission is to synthesize knowledge "for the progress of science and the benefit of society." The goal of the editorial committee was to produce critical review articles that condensed a large volume of research into a final product usable by students, specialists, and non-specialists. In the late 1990s it began publishing materials electronically. Format changes in 2006 included a simplification of the formatting, inclusion of definitions in the margins, more color, and expansion of supplementary materials, such as videos, in light of increasing access via the internet.

The size of individual volumes has grown over time: the volumes published in 2000, 2007, 2012, and 2013 were each noted at time of publication to be the largest-ever volume produced by the journal by page count or number of articles. As of 2020, it was published both in print and electronically. Some of its articles are available online in advance of the volume's publication date.

== Scope and indexing ==
It defines its scope as covering significant developments in the field of planetary science, encompassing earth science. Specific subdisciplines included are climatology, environmental science, and the history of life. Each volume begins with a prefatory chapter of the biography or autobiography of a notable scientist within the field. As of 2026, Journal Citation Reports lists the journal's impact factor as 15.6, ranking it third of 259 journals in the category "Geosciences, Multidisciplinary" and fourth of 86 in "Astronomy and Astrophysics". It is abstracted and indexed in Scopus, Science Citation Index Expanded, CAB Abstracts, INSPEC, and Academic Search, among others.

== Editorial processes ==
The Annual Review of Earth and Planetary Sciences is helmed by the editor or the co-editors. The editor is assisted by the editorial committee, which includes associate editors, regular members, and occasionally guest editors. Guest members participate at the invitation of the editor, and serve terms of one year. All other members of the editorial committee are appointed by the AR board of directors and serve five-year terms. The editorial committee determines which topics should be included in each volume and solicits reviews from qualified authors. Unsolicited manuscripts are not accepted. Peer review of accepted manuscripts is undertaken by the editorial committee.

=== Editors of volumes ===
Dates indicate publication years in which someone was credited as a lead editor or co-editor of a journal volume. The planning process for a volume begins well before the volume appears, so appointment to the position of lead editor generally occurred prior to the first year shown here. An editor who has retired or died may be credited as a lead editor of a volume that they helped to plan, even if it is published after their retirement or death.

- Fred A. Donath (1973–1980)
- George Wetherill (1981–1996)
- Raymond Jeanloz (1997–2013)
- Jeanloz and Katherine H. Freeman (2014–present)

=== Current editorial committee ===
As of 2022, the editorial committee consists of the co-editors and the following members:

- Paul L. Koch
- Michael Manga
- Galen A. McKinley
- J. Taylor Perron
- Roberta Rudnick

== See also ==
- List of scientific journals in earth and atmospheric sciences
