= The Black Hole (community center) =

The Black Hole (TBH)

General information
- Status: Active
- Address: Plot No. 5-H, Street 100, G-11/3 Islamabad Capital Territory, Islamabad, Pakistan
- Known for: Live-streamed lectures on science, society and culture.

Website
- https://theblackhole.pk/

The Black Hole is a community center located in the G 11/3 area of Islamabad, Pakistan. It is a "non-profit, open-to-all educational and intellectual space" with a view to promoting science, art and culture in Pakistan. A project of Mashal Books, it was launched on 5 March 2022 with a goal to help all citizens of Pakistan "participate fully in the scientific, social, economic and cultural life of their society".

Throughout the week, live-streamed lectures, discussions and events promoting culture are held in its 60-capacity auditorium. A small library and a science lab specifically designed for children is also one of its key features. The lectures cover a range of topics from hardcore science to socioeconomic ills in the Pakistani society. The main objective of the science lectures is to explain the concepts of "high-science and high-technology in simple Urdu and English".

== Launch ==
It was launched on 5 March 2022 as a project of Mashal Books, a non-profit publishing house in Pakistan with a view to translating and publishing high quality books on society and culture from English into Urdu. Pervez Hoodbhoy, a well-known Pakistani nuclear physicist and academic who has also headed Mashal Books since 1989, was one of the key figures behind the center's establishment.

== Police Raid ==
On Tuesday, October 24, 2023, a team of Islamabad Police led by SHO Alamgir Khan of Ramana Police Station raided The Black Hole and forcibly stopped a discussion titled The Unseen Crisis: Afghan Refugees Facing Deportation on forced deportation of Afghan Refugees. Former senator and eminent Politician and human rights activist Afrasiab Khattak, and Afghan community representative, Haji Raz Muhammad was to take part and journalist Sajjad Azhar was to moderate the discussion.

The people attending the discussion said that the police came inside the auditorium and stopped the panelists from starting the discussion. Khattak told that the police took the panelists aside, keeping the discussion on hold for at least two hours. Pervez Hoodbhoy told local news agencies that the policemen locked up The Black Hole's operations manager and confiscated his phone. He also told that some of the policemen manhandled staff. One of the staff members was punched by a policeman and thrown into a police van.

The police withdrew only when some news reporters arrived with cameras. According to Dissent Today, the SSP reportedly warned a high-ranking member of The Black Hole of 'dire consequences' before leaving. The SHO later denied the raid, saying that the police had come there on deputy commissioner's orders and only demanded an NOC (no objection certificate) as Section 144 of the CrPC was imposed on the city by the city administration. Afrasiab Khattak said that on asking a magistrate whether Section 144 was applicable to a private meeting, he couldn't provide any answers.
