= M. V. Ramana =

Physicist

M. V. Ramana is professor and Simons Chair in Disarmament, Global and Human Security at the University of British Columbia, and Director of the Masters of Public Policy and Global Affairs program at the School of Public Policy and Global Affairs.

== Career ==
M. V. Ramana obtained his Ph.D. in physics from Boston University in 1994 and was a post-doctoral fellow at the Department of Physics, University of Toronto, and the Center for International Studies, Massachusetts Institute of Technology.

He has worked at the Nuclear Futures Laboratory and the Program on Science and Global Security, both at Princeton University. He is a member of the International Panel on Fissile Materials, the Canadian Pugwash Group, the International Nuclear Risk Assessment Group, and the team that produces the annual World Nuclear Industry Status Report.

He is professor and Simons Chair in Disarmament, Global and Human Security at the University of British Columbia, and Director of the Masters of Public Policy and Global Affairs program at the School of Public Policy and Global Affairs.

== Bibliography ==
=== Books ===
- Nuclear is Not the Solution: The Folly of Atomic Power in the Age of Climate Change, Verso, 2024.
- The Power of Promise: Examining Nuclear Energy in India, Penguin Books, 2012.
- co-editor, Prisoners of the Nuclear Dream, New Delhi, Orient Longman, 2003.
- Bombing Bombay? Effects of Nuclear Weapons and a Case Study of a Hypothetical Explosion, Cambridge, MA, International Physicians for the Prevention of Nuclear War, 1999.

=== Selected articles ===
- Fissile materials in South Asia and the implications of the US-India nuclear deal, Science and Global Security, 2006, 14 (2-3), 117-143
- Nuclear power: Economic, safety, health, and environmental issues of near-term technologies, Annual Review of Environment and Resources 34, 2009, 127-152
- Economics of nuclear power from heavy water reactors, Economic and Political Weekly, 2005,1763-1773
- Fast breeder reactor programs: History and status, International Panel on Fissile Materials Research Report, 8, 2010
- Nuclear power and the public, Bulletin of the Atomic Scientists, 2011, 67 (4), 43-51
- India, Pakistan and the Bomb, Scientific American, 2001, 285 (6), 60-71
- Weapon-grade plutonium production potential in the Indian prototype fast breeder reactor, Science and Global Security, 2007, 15 (2), 85-105
- Beyond our imagination: Fukushima and the problem of assessing risk, Bulletin of the Atomic Scientists, 2011, 19 April
- Early Warning in South Asia—Constraints and Implications, Science & Global Security, 2003, 11 (2-3), 109-150
- Nuclear Power in India: Failed Past, Dubious Future, 2007, Available at www. npec-web. org/Frameset. asp
- The risks and consequences of nuclear war in South Asia, Out of the Nuclear Shadow, edited by S. Kothari, and Z. Mian, 2001, 185-196
- Costing plutonium: Economics of reprocessing in India, International Journal of Global Energy Issues, 2007, 27 (4), 454-471
- The nuclear confrontation in South Asia, SIPRI Yearbook 2003: Armaments, Disarmament and International Security, 195-212
- Nuclear power and the public. Bulletin of the Atomic Scientists. 2011;67(4):43-51. doi:10.1177/0096340211413358

== Recognitions ==
- In 2014, Ramana received, shared with Ramamurti Rajaraman, the Leo Szilard Award of the American Physical Society.

== See also ==
- Historic recurrence
- International Campaign to Abolish Nuclear Weapons
- Amory Lovins
- Edwin Lyman
- Mycle Schneider
- Benjamin K. Sovacool
- Frank N. von Hippel
