= Zia Mian =

- Born: Lahore, Punjab province, Pakistan
- Citizenship: Pakistan
- Education: Newcastle University, Newcastle upon Tyne, United Kingdom
- Awards: Leo Szilard Lectureship Award (2019)
- Scientific career
- Fields: Physics
- Workplaces: Princeton University; Yale University; Quaid-i-Azam University, Pakistan

Zia Mian (Urdu: ضياء میاں) is a Pakistani-American physicist, nuclear expert, nuclear policy maker and research scientist at Princeton University.

Currently, he is the co-director of the Project on Peace and Security in South Asia, at the Program on Science and Global Security. He is the editor of several books, his books heavily focus on the issues concerning nuclear science, nuclear technology, and Science and technology in Pakistan. Zia Mian has played a pivotal role in Pakistan's peaceful use of nuclear technology and helped make two documentary films on peace and security in South Asia. Mian has been listed as one of the 15 Asian Scientists To Watch by Asian Scientist Magazine on 15 May 2011. He was named a Fellow of the American Physical Society in 2021.

== Documentary films ==
In 2004, Dr. Zia Mian, along with well-known Pakistani Nuclear Physicist Dr. Pervez Hoodbhoy, produced two documentary films focusing on nuclear issues.

== Journals and Scientific Papers ==
- Nuclear War in South Asia with Matthew McKinzie, Zia Mian and A. H. Nayyar,
- The Nuclear Confrontation in South Asia with Zia Mian,
- Feeding potential for South Asia’s nuclear fire with Zia Mian and Frank von Hippel
- Fissile Materials in South Asia and the Implications of the U.S.-India Nuclear Deal with Zia Mian, A.H. Nayyar, and R. Rajaraman, p
- Stepping away from the Nuclear Abyss with Zia Mian
- Beyond Missile Defense with Andrew Lichterman, Zia Mian and Jurgen Scheffran
- Nuclear War in South Asia with Matthew McKinzie, Zia Mian and A. H. Nayyar
- Wrong Ends, Means, and Needs: Behind the U.S. Nuclear Deal with India with Zia Mia
- A time of testing?, Zia Mian and A.H. Nayyar
- Perspectives - Sanctions: Lift 'em, Pervez Hoodbhoy, Zia Mian
- Plutonium dispersal and health hazards from nuclear weapon accidents, Zia Mian, M V Ramana, R Rajaraman
- THE NEXT GENERATION OF NUCLEAR WEAPONS - Global debate - SOUTH ASIA, RUSSIA, CHINA & THE MIDDLE EAST - ZIA MIAN, M. V. RAMANA, ALEXANDER A. PIKAYEV, DINGLI SHEN & SAIDEH LOTFIAN warn that RRW might prompt states to reevaluate their nuclear postures—And not for the better. Zia Mian, M V Ramana, Alexander A Pikayev, Dingli Shen, Saideh Lotfian
- Resource Letter PSNAC-1: Physics and society: Nuclear arms control Alexander Glaser, Zia Mian
- Response to Zia Mian's 'How Not to Handle Nuclear Security'
- Nuclear Passions and Interests:The Founding of Atomic Pakistan by Zia Mian

== Bibliography ==
- The nuclear debate: Ironies and immoralities (1998)
- Out of the Nuclear Shadow (2002)
- Memories of Fire (2006)
- Forestalling Another Rain of Ruin: The Need to Abolish Nuclear Weapons (2008)
- Rule of Force vs. Rule of Law in Pakistan (2008)
- Pakistan’s Atomic Bomb and the Search for Security (2001)
- South Asian cultures of the bomb: atomic publics and the state in India and Pakistan
