= Pervez Hoodbhoy =

Pakistani nuclear physicist and author (born 1950)

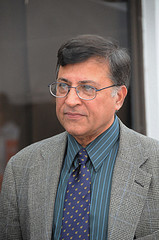
- Hoodbhoy in October 2015
- Born: 11 July 1950 (age 76); Karachi, Sindh, Pakistan
- Education: Massachusetts Institute of Technology (B.S, M.S, Ph.D)
- Known for: Parton Physics, Hard Processes, Field theory and Particle Phenomenology
- Awards: UNESCO Kalinga Prize (2003); Fulbright Award (1998); Faiz Ahmed Faiz Award (1990); Abdus Salam Award (1984); Associate of ICTP "Book of the Year Award" by National Book council of Pakistan in 1993; ROCASA (2007) for enhancing the public understanding of Science by The World Academy of Sciences, Trieste, Italy; Joseph A. Burton Forum Award (2010) by American Physical Society; Listed number 85 in Foreign Policy Magazine's list of Top 100 Global Thinkers
- Scientific career
- Fields: Nuclear physics Quantum Chromodynamics
- Workplaces: Quaid-e-Azam University; FC College University; Virtual University of Pakistan

Pervez Amirali Hoodbhoy (Note: Urdu: پرویز امِیرعلی ہودبھائی; Urdu pronunciation: [pərʋeːz əmiːɾəliː ɦuːd̪bʱaːiː]) (born 11 July 1950) is a Pakistani nuclear physicist and author. Hoodbhoy is known for his opposition to nuclear weapons and vocal defence of secularism, freedom of speech, scientific temper and education in Pakistan.

Hoodbhoy taught physics at Quaid-e-Azam University (formerly Islamabad University) from 1973 to 2020 but in between also taught sociology in addition to physics and math at FCCU and LUMS.

Since 1989 Hoodbhoy has headed Mashal Books in Lahore, a publishing house that claims to be a leading "translation effort to produce books in Urdu that promote modern thought, human rights, and emancipation of women". He initiated and co‐directed (1988–1990) the World Laboratory Project on Cosmology and High Energy Physics in Pakistan. Hoodbhoy is a sponsor of the Bulletin of the Atomic Scientists a member of the Permanent Monitoring Panel on Planetary Emergencies of the World Federation of Scientists, and a member of the Asia Pacific Leaders Network. In 2021 he took the lead role in establishing The Black Hole, a community space in Islamabad for nurturing science, art, and culture.

Awards for Hoodbhoy include the Abdus Salam Prize for Mathematics (1984); the Kalinga Prize for the popularization of science (2003); the TWAS-ROCASA prize; the Jean Meyer Award for global citizenship; the Joseph A. Burton Forum Award (2010) from the American Physical Society. In 2011, he was included in the list of 100 most influential global thinkers by Foreign Policy. From 2013 to 2017 he was a member of the UN Secretary General's advisory board on Disarmament. In 2019 he received the honorary doctorate of law from the University of British Columbia.

On 14 April 2001, the Pakistan government announced that Hoodbhoy had been selected for receiving the Sitara-i-Imtiaz from then-president, General Pervez Musharraf. However Hoodbhoy turned down the award on grounds that bureaucrats and non-scientists were not capable judging scientific work or deciding on scientific awards.

== Early and personal life ==
Hoodbhoy was born and raised in Karachi, Sindh, in a family belonging to the Sindhi Khoja Ismaili Shia community. His maternal grandparents were from Jhirk city near Hyderabad. He later identified as a Humanist and became an official signatory of Humanist Manifesto III. He has one elder brother, and three sisters including infectious diseases specialist Dr. Naseem Salahuddin and reporter Nafisa Hoodbhoy. Husband of Nafisa, Jawaid Bhutto, a renowned Sindhi intellectual, was shot and killed on 1 March 2019 in Washington D.C. He has been married twice, first to Hajra Ahmed, niece of public intellectual and activist Eqbal Ahmad. Hoodbhoy and Hajra Ahmed have two daughters together, including Alia Amirali, a well-known feminist and political activist. They divorced in 2009 and Hoodbhoy later married Sadia Manzoor who is also, like him, a physics professor. They were married late in life and do not have children together.

In response to a column which criticised Hoodbhoy in the Daily Herald Tribune in 2009, (Retd) Air Marshal Asghar Khan wrote a letter to the Editor-in-Chief and said he was distressed after reading the column. He described Hoodbhoy as "an eminent scientist and a very good Pakistani" and also wrote, "we have a very little talent of such eminence in the country and should not repeat what has happened throughout Muslim history when people of great talent and eminence have been hounded out or silenced because they held views which were not tolerated by those in power or by the majority of public opinion."

== Education ==
Hoodbhoy attended the Karachi Grammar School in Karachi for his initial schooling. After graduating, at the age of 19, Hoodbhoy went to the United States to attend the Massachusetts Institute of Technology (MIT) on a scholarship. During his undergraduate years he worked in restaurants, various odd jobs, and as a campus janitor to support his studies.

At MIT Hoodbhoy did a double major in Electric Engineering and Mathematics, and an MEng in Physics, with a concentration in solid-state physics in 1973. Immediately thereafter he joined Islamabad University (later called Quaid-e-Azam University) as a junior lecturer in October 1973 where he taught physics for two years but was also heavily involved in left-wing political work. After two years of teaching and activism he returned to MIT to work on various problems of nuclear structure theory under the supervision of Prof. John W. Negele. He was awarded a doctorate in nuclear physics in 1978 with a thesis titled, "Time Dependent Correlations in Nuclear Dynamics".

== Career ==
=== Professional ===
Hoodbhoy's PhD research was in nuclear physics but much of his later work focused on the quark-gluon structure of nuclei, quantum chromodynamics, and particle phenomenology. In particular this included the spin structure of nuclei and quark-gluon components of the proton's spin as measured in various hard processes. He has also published papers seeking to link ADS/CFT and extra space-time dimensions with certain nuclear phenomena. His other works touch on quantum hydrodynamics, Berry phases, skyrmion physics, and quantum Hall phenomena.

In 1981 Hoodbhoy accepted an offer for post-doctoral research at the University of Washington. In 1986 he spent his sabbatical year as visiting professor at Carnegie Mellon University. While still a professor at the Quaid-e-Azam University, he made several visits as a guest scientist to the International Centre for Theoretical Physics and also held short-term visiting professorships at MIT and University of Maryland. In 2010, upon reaching mandatory retirement at age 60, he started teaching in Lahore but continued to voluntarily teach advanced physics topics at QAU until 2020. Presently (2021–2025) he holds the position of adjunct professor of physics at the University of New Brunswick, Canada.

From 2011 to 2013 Hoodbhoy was at the Lahore University of Management Sciences (LUMS) as professor of physics during which period he made summer visits as a researcher to Princeton University while also writing opinion editorial columns for the Express Tribune, Dawn as well as other newspapers. The sudden termination of his contract became a matter of public controversy. He moved to the Forman Christian College-University (2013–2020) as distinguished professor of physics until his contract was abruptly cancelled as well after 8 years. Hoodbhoy contends that these terminations were due to extra-academic reasons.

=== Social Activism ===
Hoodbhoy points to Noam Chomsky, whose courses and lectures he had attended as an undergraduate at MIT, as a major influence upon his political philosophy. So also was the scholar-activist and public intellectual, Eqbal Ahmad, which whom he developed a life-long friendship. In the early 1970s Hoodbhoy worked actively with People's Labour Federation, a progressive trade union in Rawalpindi and was part of an independent Marxist group at Islamabad University headed by Professor Faheem Husain. With the advent of martial law in 1977 all union activity was banned and progressive activities forced underground.

Away from his specialized field of research, Hoodbhoy writes and speaks on a variety of topics and is a self-described liberal. New Scientist wrote that he was "Pakistan's Voice of Reason" while Physics Today described him as fierce opponent of pseudoscience and a global citizen. He has sharply criticized efforts to merge religion with science; the politicization of Islam and growth of religious extremism; Pakistan's blasphemy law; military dictators and their surrogates in Pakistan; the subjugation of Pakistani women; the takeover of the educational process by religious forces; and opposed jihad for liberating Kashmir and fighting the Soviets in Afghanistan.

Provoked by General Zia-ul-Haq's extreme measures to create a new Islamic science, Hoodbhoy authored Islam and Science: Religious Orthodoxy and the Battle for Rationality with a preface by physics Nobel Laureate, Abdus Salam. This was subsequently translated into 8 languages. The book contends that the rise of Muslim science owed to Muslim openness in an earlier phase of Islam but subsequent closing of the Muslim mind led to the demise of all intellectual production. Hoodbhoy has continued to insist that attitudinal reasons, not paucity of resources, are responsible for the stagnation of the sciences in Islam. Salam and Hoodbhoy jointly authored an essay in 1984 that critiqued Eurocentric claims to developing science.

Hoodbhoy has taken to the media repeatedly in defence of Abdus Salam. He also features prominently in the video documentary "Salam – the first ****** Nobel Laureate" and is among the notable signatories of the Humanist Manifesto.

In 1996 Hoodbhoy, together with his colleague A.H Nayyar, successfully stopped the sale of Quaid-e-Azam University's land to politicians and professors, invoking a strong counter-reaction. However, his subsequent attempts to preserve the land from politicians failed. He has been the leading critic of Pakistan's Higher Education Commission whose policies, he contends, have incentivized academic corruption and created a professor mafia.

Though I know that it is not welcome in my country and people who deviate from the notion that it is an Islamic state, are looked upon disapprovingly, I strongly feel that's what we need to head towards.

— Talking to the Hyderabad Literary Festival

Pervez Hoodbhoy criticises Pakistani attitudes on blasphemy.

=== Anti-nuclear Activism ===
While at MIT Hoodbhoy studied under physicists such as Victor Weisskopf, Philip Morrison, and Bernard Feld from the 1940s Manhattan Project. Their influence helped turn him into becoming the leading voice against the development of nuclear weapons both by India and Pakistan. In 1996, at the behest of Abdul Qadeer Khan, his activism led to his name being placed on the Exit Control List. In 2013 he was the major contributor and editor of Confronting The Bomb – Pakistani And Indian Scientists Speak Out. He is a member of the International Panel on Fissile Materials, based at Princeton University.

=== Filmography ===
From 1991 to 2004 Hoodbhoy hosted and authored three major 13-part documentary series in Urdu on Pakistan Television on popular science and education. To date these have been the only science documentaries produced by PTV. In 2003 he was the recipient of UNESCO's 2003 Kalinga Prize for the popularization of science.

Following the nuclear tests of India and Pakistan, Hoodbhoy hosted and produced a 30-minute documentary "Pakistan and India Under the Nuclear Shadow" (2001). With help from Zia Mian, this was followed by a longer documentary on the Kashmir dispute in 2004. It has been the only documentary produced in Pakistan so far that considers the narratives of all three protagonists and is titled, "Crossing the Lines: Kashmir, Pakistan, India".

== Publications ==
=== Books ===
- Pakistan: Origins, Identity and Future, published by Routledge (London, New York), 2023.
- Confronting the Bomb – Pakistani and Indian Scientists Speak Out, (edited) Oxford University Press, 2013.
- Education and the State – Fifty Years of Pakistan, (edited) Oxford University Press, 1998.
- Islam & Science: Religious Orthodoxy and the Battle for Rationality, published by ZED Books, London, in 1991 with translations in Turkish, Malaysian, Indonesian, Arabic, Spanish, Sindhi, and Urdu.
- Proceedings of School on Fundamental Physics and Cosmology, co-edited with A. Ali, World Scientific, Singapore, 1991.

=== Selected scientific papers and articles ===
- Hoodbhoy, Pervez (30 March 2006). "Two-photon effects in lepton-antilepton pair photoproduction from a nucleon target using real photons". Physical Review D. 73 (5) 054027. arXiv:hep-ph/0601182. Bibcode:2006PhRvD..73e4027H. doi:10.1103/physrevd.73.054027. ISSN 1550-7998. S2CID 15290218.
- Hoodbhoy, Pervez; Ji, Xiangdong; Yuan, Feng (6 January 2004). "Probing Quark-Distribution Amplitudes through Generalized Parton Distributions at Large Momentum Transfer". Physical Review Letters. 92 (1) 012003. arXiv:hep-ph/0309085. Bibcode:2004PhRvL..92a2003H. doi:10.1103/physrevlett.92.012003. ISSN 0031-9007. PMID 14753983. S2CID 5072354.
- Hoodbhoy, Pervez (11 March 2002). "Explicit proof that electroproduction of transversely polarized mesons vanishes in perturbative QCD". Physical Review D. 65 (7) 077501. American Physical Society (APS). arXiv:hep-ph/0108214. Bibcode:2002PhRvD..65g7501H. doi:10.1103/physrevd.65.077501. ISSN 0556-2821. S2CID 17897431.
- Hoodbhoy, Pervez; Ji, Xiangdong (12 November 1999). "Does the gluon spin contribute in a gauge-invariant way to nucleon spin?". Physical Review D. 60 (11) 114042. American Physical Society (APS). arXiv:hep-ph/9908275. Bibcode:1999PhRvD..60k4042H. doi:10.1103/physrevd.60.114042. ISSN 0556-2821. S2CID 7303675.
- Hoodbhoy, Pervez (21 June 1999). "Nucleon-Quarkonium Elastic Scattering and the Gluon Contribution to Nucleon Spin". Physical Review Letters. 82 (25): 4985–4987. arXiv:hep-ph/9903312. Bibcode:1999PhRvL..82.4985H. doi:10.1103/physrevlett.82.4985. ISSN 0031-9007. S2CID 118954202.

== Appearances in TV shows ==
- Raaste Ilm ke (Pathways to Knowledge) on PTV, 1988
- Asrar-e-Jahan (Mysteries of the Universe) on PTV, 1995
- Bazm-e-Kainat (Gathering of all Creation) on PTV, 2003
- Alif on Geo TV. Debate with Jawed Ghamidi, 2006
- Aik Din Geo Kay Saath on Geo TV, February 2010
- Capital Talk on Geo TV, 29 August 2012
- Among the Believers (Netflix), 2015
- Salam-The first Nobel laureate (Netflix) 2018

== See also ==
- Tafazzul Husain Kashmiri
- Abdus Salam
