= Frank N. von Hippel =

American physicist

- Education: MIT and Oxford University
- Occupation: Physicist

Frank N. von Hippel (born 1937) is an American physicist. He is Professor and Co-Director of Program on Science and Global Security at Princeton University and the Princeton School of Public and International Affairs.

He is Arthur von Hippel's son, and Eric von Hippel's brother.

== Positions held ==
Frank von Hippel is a theoretical physicist, and a Professor of Public and International Affairs at Princeton University. Prior to working at Princeton, he worked for ten years in the field of theoretical elementary-particle physics.

In the 1980s, as chairman of the Federation of American Scientists, Von Hippel partnered with Evgenyi Velikhov in advising Mikhail Gorbachev on the technical basis for steps to end the nuclear arms race.

From 1993 to 1995, he was the Assistant Director for National Security in the White House Office of Science and Technology Policy.

He now serves on the National Advisory Board of the Center for Arms Control and Non-Proliferation, the research arm of Council for a Livable World. He is a member of the International Panel on Fissile Materials.

== Research interests ==
Primary areas of policy research include: nuclear arms control and nonproliferation, nuclear power and energy issues, improving automobile fuel economy, and checks and balances in policymaking for technology. He played a major role in developing cooperative programs to increase the security of Russian nuclear-weapons-usable materials.

Von Hippel and his colleagues have worked on fissile material policy issues for the past 30 years, including contributions to: "ending the U.S. program to foster the commercialization of plutonium breeder reactors, convincing President Gorbachev to embrace the idea of a Fissile Material Production Cutoff Treaty, launching the U.S.-Russian cooperative nuclear materials protection, control and accounting program, and broadening efforts to eliminate the use of high-enriched uranium in civilian reactors worldwide".

== Awards and honors ==
- 1977, von Hippel and Joel Primack shared the American Physical Society's Forum Award., for their book, Advice and Dissent: Scientists in the Political Arena.
- 1983, elected a Fellow of the American Physical Society.
- 1993 MacArthur Fellows Program.
- 2005, he received the George F. Kennan Distinguished Peace Leadership Award.
- 2010 Leo Szilard Lectureship Award.

== Degrees ==
- D. Phil. (Theoretical Physics), Oxford University, 1962
- B.S. (Physics), M.I.T., 1959

== Works ==
- "Scientists and the Politics of Technology", Frank von Hippel and Joel Primack, Applied Spectroscopy, Vol. 25, Issue 4, pp. 403–413 (1971)
- Advice and Dissent: Scientists in the Political Arena. Basic Books, 1974
- "Warhead and Fissile-material Declarations", Reversing the arms race: how to achieve and verify deep reductions in the nuclear arsenals, Editors Frank Von Hippel, R. Z. Sagdeev, Taylor & Francis, 1990, ISBN 978-2-88124-390-5
- "Foreword", Russian Strategic Nuclear Forces, Editors Pavel Podvig, Oleg Bukharin, MIT Press, 2004, ISBN 978-0-262-66181-2

== See also ==
- M.V. Ramana
