= Byurakan Conference =

Scientific conference in Armenia in 1964

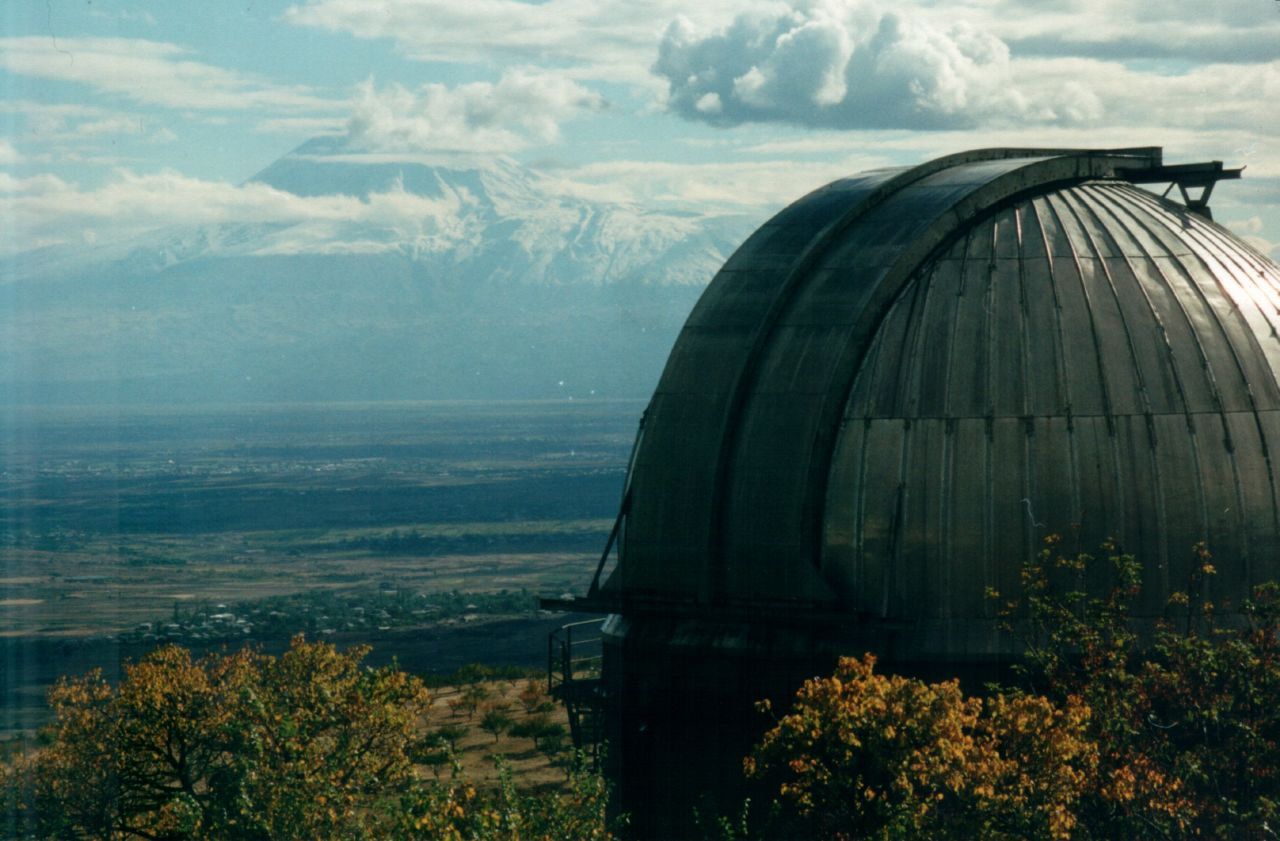
Byurakan Astrophysical Observatory

The Byurakan Conference was held at the Byurakan Astrophysical Observatory in Armenia in 1964, at the initiative of the young scientist Nikolai Kardashev. It brought together a large number of Soviet astronomers and astrophysicists to take stock of knowledge and results in the search for traces of extraterrestrial life. The possibility of detecting extraterrestrial civilizations with the instruments available at the time was also discussed, as well as the criteria for communication with extraterrestrial intelligence.

The conference proceedings were published in Russian by the Academy of Sciences of the Armenian SSR in 1965. The Israel Program of Scientific Translations produced an English translation in 1967. This conference laid the foundation for the First Soviet-American Conference on Communication with Extraterrestrial Intelligence, held at the Byurakan Astrophysical Observatory in September 1971.

== Goals of the conference ==
Since 1962, Nikolai Kardashev has been a member of a SETI research group at the Sternberg Astronomical Institute in Moscow. In 1964, he organized the first Soviet conference on the possibility of extraterrestrial civilizations, held at the Byurakan Astrophysical Observatory in Armenia.

This national conference was a response to the 1961 Green Bank Conference, held at the Green Bank Observatory in the USA.

Bringing together radio astronomers, its goal was to "arrive at rational technical and linguistic solutions to the problem of communication with an extraterrestrial civilization that is more advanced than Earth's civilization".

== Presentations and speakers ==
Nikolai Kardashev presented his classification, while Troitskii announced that it was possible to detect signals from other galaxies. Kardashev's work was the focus of everyone's attention.

For Nikolai Kardashev, "within the next 5-10 years, all sources of radiation with the largest observable flux, in all regions of the electromagnetic spectrum, will have been discovered and studied", since the sensitivity of listening devices has reached its technical limits. In his view, the entire electromagnetic spectrum will be known and, consequently, the list of objects that could be artificial sources could be extended. The search for artificial signals would then have to focus on objects of maximum luminosity or radiation belonging to a particular region of the spectrum, but also on objects of significant mass, and on those representing the bulk of matter in the Universe. As early as 1971, Kardashev saw the need to prepare a listening and analysis plan that would enable the successful search for extraterrestrial civilizations. Mankind would then be in a position to overcome the "main dilemma" as formulated by Enrico Fermi. According to the Soviet astronomer, this dilemma is certainly related to our lack of information and knowledge.

Kardashev believed that a research project like Ozma was incapable of detecting a Type I civilization (an idea also promoted by Kaplan in 1971), and that SETI should instead concentrate on finding intense radio signals that could emanate from active Type II or III civilizations. To prove that this approach was effective, Kardashev turned his attention to two radio sources discovered by the California Institute of Technology and named CTA-21 and CTA-102. Gennadii Borisovich Sholomitskii then used the Russian Astronomical Research Station to study data from CTA-102. He found that this radio source was notable for its variability. Kardashev concluded that this could be an indication of an artificial emission source, albeit with a relatively short lifetime.

== See also ==
- First Soviet-American Conference on Communication with Extraterrestrial Intelligence
- Kardashev scale
- Extraterrestrial life
- Fermi paradox
- Anthropic principle
- Astrobiology
