= Energy consumption =

Consumption of energy by animals and societies

Per capita energy use

Energy consumption is the amount of energy used. In physics, energy consumption refers to the transformation of energy from one form to another, rather than its complete disappearance. According to the law of conservation of energy, energy cannot be created or destroyed, only converted. For instance, when a light bulb "consumes" electricity, it is not destroying the electrical energy but rather converting it into light and heat. Similarly, a car "consumes" gasoline by converting its chemical energy into kinetic energy (motion) and heat. Understanding energy consumption is crucial for analyzing the efficiency of various systems and processes, as the ultimate goal is often to minimize the conversion of useful energy into less desirable forms, such as waste heat.

From a societal and economic perspective, "energy consumption" often refers to the use of energy resources by human civilization to power homes, industries, transportation, and other activities. This typically involves drawing upon various primary energy sources, including fossil fuels (coal, oil, natural gas), nuclear power, and renewable sources (solar, wind, hydro, geothermal). The scale and patterns of this consumption have significant implications for environmental sustainability, economic development, and geopolitical stability. Analyzing trends in global and regional energy consumption helps policymakers and researchers understand resource availability, greenhouse gas emissions, and the potential for transitioning to more sustainable energy systems.

== Electrical engineering ==
In electrical engineering, "energy consumption" specifically refers to the amount of electrical energy utilized by a device, circuit, or system over a period of time. This is distinct from "power," which is the rate at which energy is consumed or transferred. While power is measured in watts (W) or kilowatts (kW), energy consumption is typically measured in watt-hours (Wh) or kilowatt-hours (kWh). The relationship is fundamental: energy (E) equals power (P) multiplied by time (t):

$$\text{E=P×t}$$

Electrical engineers are deeply concerned with energy consumption for several critical reasons. First, it directly impacts operational costs for consumers and industries, as electricity bills are calculated based on kWh consumed. Second, energy consumption is inextricably linked to energy efficiency. An efficient electrical system or device converts a larger proportion of input electrical energy into its desired output (e.g., light, motion, computation) and minimizes conversion into undesirable forms, primarily heat. Understanding and optimizing energy consumption is therefore crucial for designing systems that are not only effective but also sustainable and cost-effective, leading to advancements in areas like power electronics, smart grids, and low-power integrated circuits.

== Biology ==
In the body, energy consumption is part of energy homeostasis. It derived from food energy. Energy consumption in the body is a product of the basal metabolic rate and the physical activity level. The physical activity level are defined for a non-pregnant, non-lactating adult as that person's total energy expenditure (TEE) in a 24-hour period, divided by his or her basal metabolic rate (BMR):

$$\text{PAL}=\frac{\text{TEE/24h}}{\text{BMR}}$$

== Demographics ==
Topics related to energy consumption in a demographic sense are:

- World energy supply and consumption
- Domestic energy consumption
- Electric energy consumption

=== Effects of energy consumption ===
- Environmental impact of the energy industry
  - Climate change
- White's law

=== Reduction of energy consumption ===
- Energy conservation, the practice of decreasing the quantity of energy used
- Efficient energy use

== See also ==
- Energy efficiency – Methods for higher energy efficiency
- Energy efficiency in transport – Discussing what form of transport is the most fuel efficient and economical
- Electricity generation – Process of generating electrical power
- Energy mix – Primary energy sources from which secondary energy for direct use is produced
- Energy policy – How a government or business deals with energy
- Energy transformation – Process of changing energy
- Fuel consumption – Form of thermal efficiency
