= White's law =

White's law, named after Leslie White and published in 1943, states that, other factors remaining constant, "culture evolves as the amount of energy harnessed per capita per year is increased, or as the efficiency of the instrumental means of putting the energy to work is increased".

== Description ==
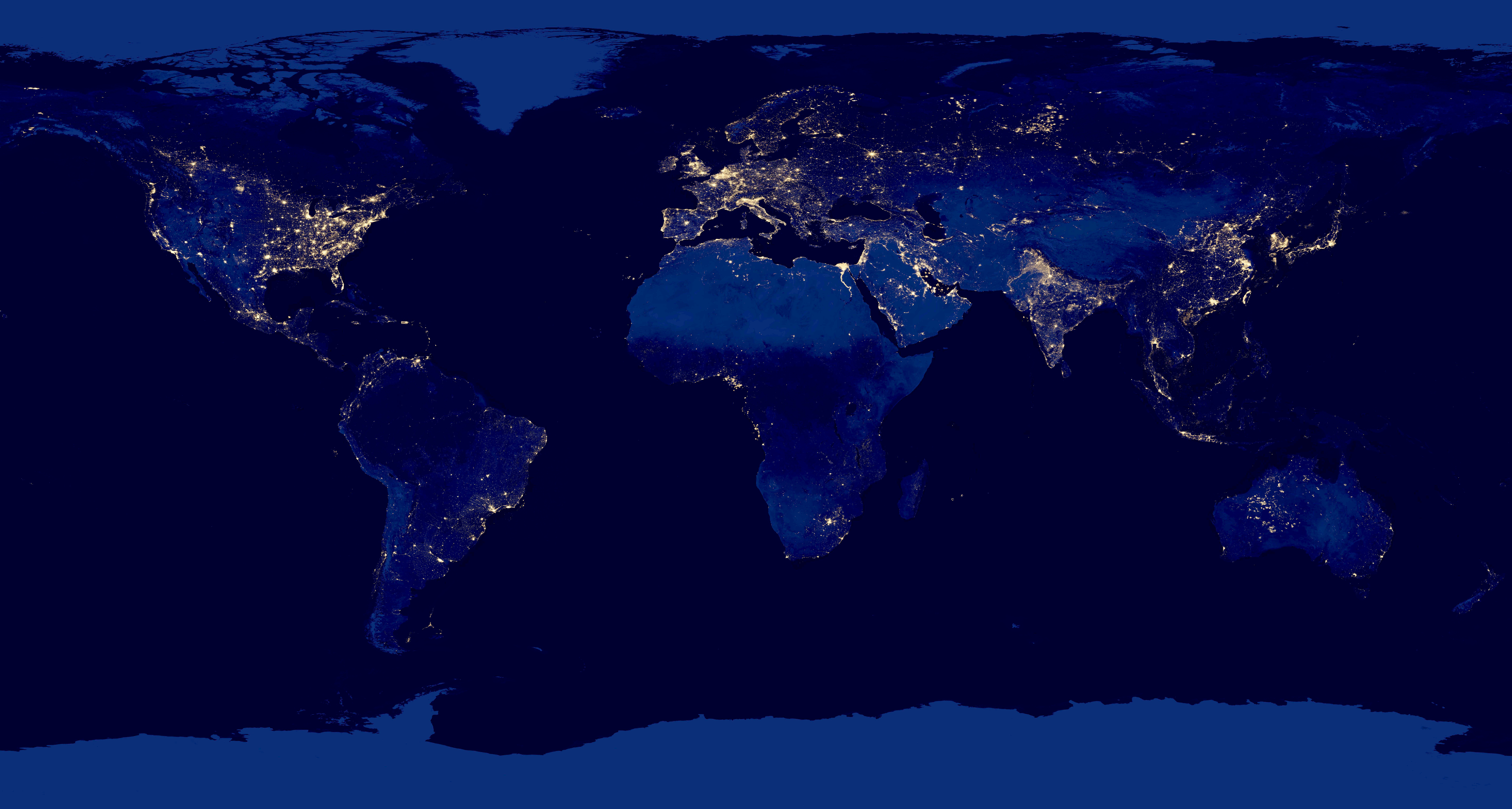
Composite image of the Earth at night in 2012, created by NASA and NOAA. The brightest areas of the Earth are the most urbanized, but not necessarily the most populous. Even more than 100 years after the invention of the electric light, some regions remain thinly populated and unlit.

White spoke of culture as a general human phenomenon and claimed not to speak of 'cultures' in the plural. His theory, published in 1959 in The Evolution of Culture: The Development of Civilization to the Fall of Rome, rekindled interest in social evolutionism and is counted prominently among the neoevolutionists. He believed that culture – meaning the sum total of all human cultural activity on the planet – was evolving.

White differentiated between three components of culture:

1. Technological,
2. Sociological and
3. Ideological, and argued that it was the technological component which plays a primary role or is the primary determining factor responsible for the cultural evolution.

=== Argument synopsis ===
White's materialist approach is evident in the following quote: "man as an animal species, and consequently culture as a whole, is dependent upon the material, mechanical means of adjustment to the natural environment". This technological component can be described as material, mechanical, physical and chemical instruments, as well as the way people use these techniques. White's argument on the importance of technology goes as follows:

1. Technology is an attempt to solve the problems of survival.
2. This attempt ultimately means capturing enough energy and diverting it for human needs.
3. Societies that capture more energy and use it more efficiently have an advantage over other societies.
4. Therefore, these different societies are more advanced in an evolutionary sense.

For White "the primary function of culture" and the one that determines its level of advancement is its ability to "harness and control energy". White's law states that the measure by which to judge the relative degree of evolvedness of culture was the amount of energy it could capture (energy consumption). White differentiates between five stages of human development. In the first, people use energy of their own muscles. In the second, they use the energy of domesticated animals. In the third, they use the energy of plants (so White refers to agricultural revolution here). In the fourth, they learn to use the energy of natural resources: coal, oil, gas. In the fifth, they harness nuclear energy.

=== White's energy formula ===
White introduced a formula:

$$C = ET,$$

...where E is a measure of energy consumed per capita per year, T is the measure of efficiency of technical factors utilising the energy and C represents the degree of cultural development. In his own words: "the basic law of cultural evolution" was "culture evolves as the amount of energy harnessed per capita per year is increased, or as the efficiency of the instrumental means of putting the energy to work is increased." Therefore "we find that progress and development are affected by the improvement of the mechanical means with which energy is harnessed and put to work as well as by increasing the amounts of energy employed". Although White stops short of promising that technology is the panacea for all the problems that affect mankind, like technological utopians do, his theory treats technological factor as the most important factor in the evolution of society and is similar to the later works of Gerhard Lenski, the theory of Kardashev scale of Russian astronomer, Nikolai Kardashev and to some notions of technological singularity.

== Earlier research ==
In 1915, Geographer James Fairgrieve outlined a similar law of history. In its widest sense on its material side, he wrote, history is the story of man's increasing ability to control energy. By energy he meant the capacity for doing work, for causing—not controlling—movement of men and machines. Man's life is taken up by the one endeavor to harness as much energy as possible and to waste as little as possible. Any means where he can harness more or waste less marks an advance and important event in the world history. Inventions mark stages of progress. The forthcoming League of Nations, he believed in the first year of World War I, would be another stage in progress in saving energy, as it would save the energy wasted in wars.

== See also ==
- Astronomical engineering – Very large artificial object
- Clarke's three laws – Axioms proposed by British science fiction writer Arthur C. Clarke
- Drake equation – Estimate of extraterrestrial civilizations
- Kardashev scale
- Tabby's Star – Star noted for unusual dimming events
- Gerhard Lenski
- Orders of magnitude (power) – Comparison of a wide range of physical powers
- Orders of magnitude (energy) – Comparison of a large range of energies
- Radio signal from HD 164595 – Star in the constellation of Hercules
- Terraforming – Hypothetical planetary engineering process
- World energy supply and consumption – Global production and usage of energy
