= First Soviet-American Conference on Communication with Extraterrestrial Intelligence =

First Soviet-American Conference on Communication with Extraterrestrial Intelligence was a conference held on September 5–11, 1971, at the Byurakan Observatory, in the Armenian SSR. The conference was jointly organized by the U.S. National Academy of Sciences (with assistance from the U.S. National Science Foundation) and the U.S.S.R. Academy of Sciences.

It was preceded by the All-Soviet Byurakan Conference on the same topic, held at the same observatory in 1964.

Organizing committee: Carl Sagan, Frank Drake, Philip Morrison, Nikolai Kardashev, Victor Ambartsumian, Iosif Shklovsky, Vsevolod Troitsky.

Notable participants: Semion Braude, Francis Crick, Freeman Dyson, Marvin Minsky, Kent V. Flannery, Vitaly Ginzburg, Thomas Gold, Sebastian von Hoerner, David H. Hubel, Kenneth Kellermann, Richard Borshay Lee, György Marx, William H. McNeill, Bernard M. Oliver, Leslie Orgel, John R. Platt, Gunther Stent, Charles Hard Townes.

As a result of the conference, the following research directions were formulated:

1. A search for signals and for evidence of astroengineering activities in the radiation of a few hundred chosen nearby stars and of a limited number of other selected objects, covering the wavelength range from visible to decimeter waves, using the largest existing astronomical instruments.
2. A search for signals from powerful sources within galaxies of the local group, including searches for strong impulsive signals.
3. Exploration of the region of minimum noise in the submillimeter band, in order to determine its suitability for observing extraterrestrial civilizations.
4. The design, among others, of powerful new astronomical instruments with roughly the following parameters:
  1. A decimeter wave radiotelescope with an effective area >1 km^{2}.
  2. A millimeter wave telescope with an effective area > 10^{4} m^{2}.
  3. A submillimeter wave telescope with an effective area > 10^{3} m^{2}.
  4. An infrared telescope with an effective area 10^{2} m^{2}.
5. The definition of a system for keeping the entire sky under constant surveillance, which could lead to a search of wider scope than those listed under #1 and #2.

The conference proceedings were first published in English, edited by Carl Sagan, in 1973. Two years later, a slightly shorter Soviet version came out, which featured an introduction by Samuil Kaplan and an afterword by Stanislaw Lem.

== See also ==
- Byurakan Conference
- Communication with extraterrestrial intelligence
- Fermi paradox
