= Kardashev scale =

Measure of a civilization's evolution

Energy consumption in three types of civilization as defined by Sagan's extended Kardashev scale

The Kardashev scale (Russian: шкала Кардашёва, romanized: shkala Kardashova) is a method of measuring a civilization's level of technological advancement based on the amount of energy it is capable of harnessing and using. As both a proposed method of tracking civilizational progress and a way to evaluate potential alien civilizations, it occupies an intersection between futures studies and xenology. The measure was proposed by Soviet astronomer Nikolai Kardashev in 1964, forming the basis for a series of papers proposing ways to detect super civilizations and direct the search for extraterrestrial intelligence.

Kardashev's initial model was developed starting from a functional definition of civilization, based on the immutability of physical laws, and using human civilization as a model for extrapolation. He proposed a classification of civilizations into three types, based on the axiom of exponential growth:

- A Type I civilization (planetary) is able to access all the energy available on its planet and store it for consumption.
- A Type II civilization (stellar) can directly consume a star's energy, such as through the use of a Dyson sphere.
- A Type III civilization (galactic) is able to capture all the energy emitted by its galaxy, and every object within it, such as every star, black hole, etc.

Under this scale, the sum of human civilization does not yet reach Type I status, though it approaches it. Extensions of the scale have since been proposed, including a wider range of power levels (Types 0, IV, and V) and the use of metrics other than pure power, e.g., computational growth or food consumption.

== Kardashev's publications ==
=== First publication (1964) ===
A projection of the Kardashev scale to 2040 based on data from the International Energy Agency World Energy Outlook

Kardashev first outlined his scale in a paper presented at the 1964 conference that communicated findings on BS-29-76, the Byurakan Conference in the Armenian SSR, which reviewed the Soviet radio astronomy space listening program. The paper was titled "Передача информации внеземными цивилизациями" or Transmission of Information by Extraterrestrial Civilizations. The paper was published in 1964 first in Russian in the March–April issue of the Astronomicheskii Zhurnal, then in English in the September–October 1964 issue of the Soviet Astronomical Journal. In it, the scientist presents a calculation of the evolution of the power needs of humanity. Assuming that overall human power use will continue to increase, he calculates that the rate of energy consumption will cross specific mileposts. Kardashev proposed a typology of technological civilizations based on the evolutive attainment of the three power harnessing mileposts he described.

A civilization known as "Type I" has achieved a technological level close to the one attained on Earth at the time Kardashev's article was submitted (December 1963), with a rate of energy consumption evaluated at about 4×10^{12} watts (W). A civilization known as "Type II" would surpass the first by fourteen orders of magnitude, matching the entire power emitted by the Sun in about 3,200 years, i.e., Earth's home star's "output" at that time, predicted at 4×10^{26} W. Finally, a civilization known as "Type III" reaches the milepost set in 5,800 years when humanity's rate of energy consumption is predicted by the author to match the power emitted by the approximated 10^{11} stars in the Milky Way galaxy, which involves harnessing power of up to an estimated 4×10^{37} W.

Assuming the development of radio, Kardashev predicted that in the following two decades (i.e. in the 1980s) it would be possible to build antennas of 100,000 m^{2} capable of detecting Type II and III civilizations. A Type I civilization like that of Earth would be able to receive the extraordinary energetic emissions of the other types of civilizations, which would supposedly be able to emit continuously.

Kardashev then examined the characteristics of a transmission from an artificial source. He mentioned the two cosmic radio sources discovered in 1963 by the California Institute of Technology, CTA-21 and CTA-102 in particular, which would have characteristics close to those of a presumed artificial source. The most suitable region of the galaxy for observing Type II and III civilizations would then be the Galactic Center, due to the high density of the stellar population it harbors. He then recommended that the search programs for such artificial sources should focus on other nearby galaxies, such as the Andromeda Galaxy, the Magellanic Clouds, M87, or Centaurus A. Kardashev concluded his paper by noting that the possible discovery of even the simplest organisms on Mars would increase the likelihood that Type II civilizations exist in the galaxy.

=== Second publication (1980) ===
==== Towards an energetic definition of civilization ====
In 1980, Nikolai Kardashev published a second article entitled Strategies of Searching for Extraterrestrial Intelligence: A Fundamental Approach to the Basic Problem, in which he stated that:

Detection and studies of extraterrestrial civilizations constitute a problem of immense significance for the progress of humanity and for its culture and philosophy. The discovery of intelligent life in the Universe would provide a guideline to the possible development of our civilization over astronomical time spans.

— Nikolai Kardashev, Strategies of Searching for Extraterrestrial Intelligence: A Fundamental Approach to the Basic Problem

A graph of world primary energy consumption in 2011 according to the BP Statistical Review

According to the Soviet astronomer, the Earth's civilization would be too young to be able to contact another civilization that would certainly be more advanced; the Solar System is too young with its 5 billion years, and the first ancestors of today's man appeared only 6 million years ago at the earliest; the oldest celestial objects are between 10 and 14 billion years old; it is clear that the other civilizations are incomparably older than the human civilization. Therefore, the knowledge of these civilizations must be greater than Earth's, and, he reasoned, they must surely be aware of what humans are doing. Kardashev believed it is probable that the present state of Earth's civilization is only one of the stages through which civilizations pass during their evolution. It is thus possible to define civilization on the basis of this universal characteristic, which allowed Aleksandr Lyapunov to define life as "a highly stable state of matter, which uses information encoded by the states of individual molecules to produce maintaining reactions", which Kardashev calls the "functional definition of civilization". He therefore suggests thinking of civilization as a "highly stable state of matter capable of acquiring, making abstract analysis of, and utilizing information to obtain qualitatively new information about its environment and about itself, to improve its capabilities of gathering new information for producing sustaining reactions."

Civilization is therefore characterized by the quality of the information acquired by its operating program, and by the energy required to implement these functions. By "information about its environment and about itself", Kardashev specified that it is data about organic or inorganic nature, science, technology, economy, culture, arts, etc. From this definition, he proposed a diagram representing the interactions between a civilization and its environment, and enumerated a number of scientific problems arising from these interactions with the information available in the Universe.

From this definition, Kardashev drew three conclusions. The first postulated that because of the vast and unlimited set of activities required by scientific problems, the period during which civilizations must transmit and communicate is necessarily long, even unlimited. On the other hand, since our present development covers only a negligible fraction of this communication phase, Kardashev hypothesized the high improbability that we will meet "brothers in intelligence" who are at the same stage of evolution as we are. We would be more likely to communicate with highly advanced civilizations that would know and use the laws of physics to a degree that we would not yet be able to understand. Kardashev asserted that "this last point should be taken into account in the research programs of extraterrestrial civilizations" and concluded that it is very likely that our present state is only one of the stages through which every civilization passes during its evolution.

==== Two strategies for searching for intelligent signals ====
Kardashev then analyzed various models and hypotheses of the evolution of civilization. Answering the question of the Russian astronomer Iosif Shklovsky, who in an article published in 1977 entitled Possibility of the Intelligent Life in the Universe Being Unique found it strange that the "shock wave of intelligence" of a supercivilization had not yet reached the limits of the whole Universe, Kardashev put forward two explanatory hypotheses. In the first, he postulated that it would not be useful for a supercivilization to expand the space it occupies in order to maintain its activity, and in the second, it is possible that a civilization, instead of dispersing itself in space, would rather continue its activities of information analysis in order to discover new fundamental laws (such as the exploration of the microcosm, or black holes for example).

However, such civilization activities require the use of abundant energy. According to the laws of thermodynamics, an important part of this consumed energy must be converted into radiation of a bolometric magnitude approximately equal to that of the radiation background surrounding the source. The spectral distribution of this intensity must be close to that of a black body. This would be a possible way to search for extraterrestrial civilizations. Such energy consumption would also require a large amount of solid matter for stellar engineering activities, which Kardashev called "cosmic miracles". In short, information about the possible existence of an extraterrestrial civilization would come in the form of electromagnetic radiation.

With regard to the fate of civilizations, Kardashev saw two concepts, from which two strategies for the search for extraterrestrial civilizations can be derived. The first, which he called "terrestrial chauvinism", is based on the principle that civilizations can only stabilize or perish at a level of development close to ours currently reached. The second, which he called the "evolutionary concept", holds that civilizations are capable of reaching higher levels of development than that of contemporary humanity. In the first case, the best search strategy using astronomical detection means (e.g., the SETI program) would be to observe the most powerful (and often the most distant) sources of radiation in space.

The observer will then be able to determine if they are natural emission sources, and only then can the search focus on objects with weaker radiation. In the second case, he recommended to search for new and powerful sources of radiation, especially in the poorly known regions of the electromagnetic spectrum. These sources could be significant or periodic monochromatic signals from the galactic center, from other galaxies or from quasars and other exotic cosmic objects.

Kardashev believed that the search should focus on the millimeter wavelength spectrum, close to the maximum intensity of the cosmic microwave background, rather than in the 21-centimeter band (which is the domain of investigation of the SETI program). According to Kardashev, in order to capture the significant radiation of an advanced civilization emitted by a megastructure (such as a Dyson sphere), a radio telescope with a diameter larger than that of the Earth would have to be placed in orbital space.

Kardashev concluded by predicting that the search for extraterrestrial civilizations would lead to positive results in the [then] next decade, giving humanity access to a vast amount of information about the Universe and its evolution over a period of several billion years.

=== Third publication (1985) ===
==== Discovering supercivilizations ====
In the article On the Inevitability and the Possible Structure of Supercivilizations published in 1985, Kardashev evokes the possible scenarios and the means of investigation available to humanity for the detection of hypothetical extraterrestrial supercivilizations. The Soviet astronomer reminds us that we search for these supercivilizations on the basis of our own development criteria, and that predictions are possible only for extraterrestrial worlds close to our technological level, the others being beyond our intellectual representation. Nevertheless, it seems useful to him to conceive models of supercivilizations based at the same time on imagination and on our present scientific knowledge. Since the laws of physics are immutable, even if new laws are discovered in the future, they will not abolish those already known.

According to Kardashev, theoretical models of supercivilizations must meet two basic assumptions. The first is that the range of supercivilization activities that obey the laws of physics is limited only by natural and scientific constraints, while the second is that the evolution of supercivilization activities cannot be interrupted or limited by intrinsic, inherent contingencies, such as large-scale social conflicts. For Kardashev, unlike other scientists, supercivilizations cannot self-destruct or retrogress. According to these principles, there must exist in space megastructures of great size, emitting a lot of energy and information, and existing for billions of years, while being compact enough to rapidly exchange large amounts of data between them.

A supercivilization would thus create a technological structure of cosmic dimensions. As an example, Kardashev cites Freeman Dyson's megastructure, in the form of a sphere of several astronomical units in diameter. Other phenomena may indicate highly technological activities, such as artificially exploding stars or the changing of stellar orbits to store mass and energy. Giant molecular clouds also hold great potential for astroengineering. Kardashev even raises the possibility of a supercivilization reshaping the entire galaxy.

Then he evokes the theoretical and mathematical possibility of the existence of a megastructure in the form of a disk rotating on itself at a constant angular velocity. According to him, the search for intelligent signals should be directed to the detection of such megastructures at the characteristic radiation (20 μm). Quasars or galactic centers can be excellent candidates to testify to the existence of a supercivilization since they emit strong infrared radiation, which indicates a solid structure. The astronomer advises to look for these objects in a wavelength range from a few microns to a few millimeters. Large intelligent structures can also be detected by the fact that they screen or reflect the surrounding radiation.

==== Possible scenarios for the evolution of supercivilizations ====
Kardashev believes that it is very likely that a supercivilization has already detected and observed humanity through cosmic-sized telescopes. He discusses this in a 1997 article on the subject, entitled Radioastron – a Radio Telescope Much Greater than the Earth. For this supercivilization, the science of "cosmic ethnography" must be highly developed. However, the fact that no contact has been made so far could be explained by ethical considerations of these civilizations. Based on this principle, Kardashev sees only two possible evolutionary scenarios for a supercivilization: natural evolution and evolution after contact with other extraterrestrial civilizations. He considers more likely the scenario based on contact between two highly developed, technologically and culturally advanced civilizations; this scenario, which he calls the "Urbanization Hypothesis", would result in the regrouping and unification of several civilizations within a few compact regions of the Universe.

Kardashev lists, in the form of investigative tools, six possible scenarios (summarized in a table at the end of his 1997 article) that explain the evolution of a civilization. Each of the scenarios corresponds to a probability, one or more objects to be observed, an adapted procedure, and, finally the possible consequences for our civilization:

1. The scenario of a large unification of civilizations over an extent of 1 to 10 billion light-years with concentration in a certain region has a probability of 60%. These civilizations are to be searched for in the most powerful quasars and in the galactic bulge, at a radiation level higher than 10^{38} W, in the wavelengths from 10 μm to 10 cm, as well as in the other regions of the spectrum. This is to detect megastructures or signals with a wavelength of 1.5 mm and omnidirectional emission up to 21 cm. In the event of contact, humanity would see progress in all areas of society in order to join this supercivilization; it is also expected that an ethnographic conservatory would be created on Earth.
2. The scenario of a unification on the scale of the galactic cluster has only a 20% probability of realization. Kardashev advises to observe the Virgo cluster (especially M87) and other clusters in a similar way as in the first scenario. The consequences for humanity are the same as in the first scenario.
3. The scenario of a unification on the scale of galaxies has only a 10% probability. To confirm it, we must study the galactic centers, both of the Milky Way and of neighboring galaxies (such as M31, M33), according to a procedure similar to that of the first scenario. The consequences for humanity are the same as in the first scenario.
4. The scenario of a complete colonization of space has no probability of being realized according to Kardashev because if it were realizable then "they" would already be on Earth; yet this is not the case. However, in the case of a contact, the consequences on humanity are the same as in the first scenario.
5. This scenario assumes that all civilizations would have destroyed themselves before any contact. Kardashev estimates the probability of this to be 10%. Humanity should be able to detect ancient megastructures in the vicinity of the nearest stars. As a result, no contact with humanity can take place.
6. The last scenario suggests that we are the first or the only ones in the Universe. Kardashev estimates its probability at 10%. Only exobiology can confirm or falsify such a scenario. We can imagine a potential contact in the distant future, and then the consequences would be similar to those of the other five scenarios.

=== Fourth publication (1997) ===
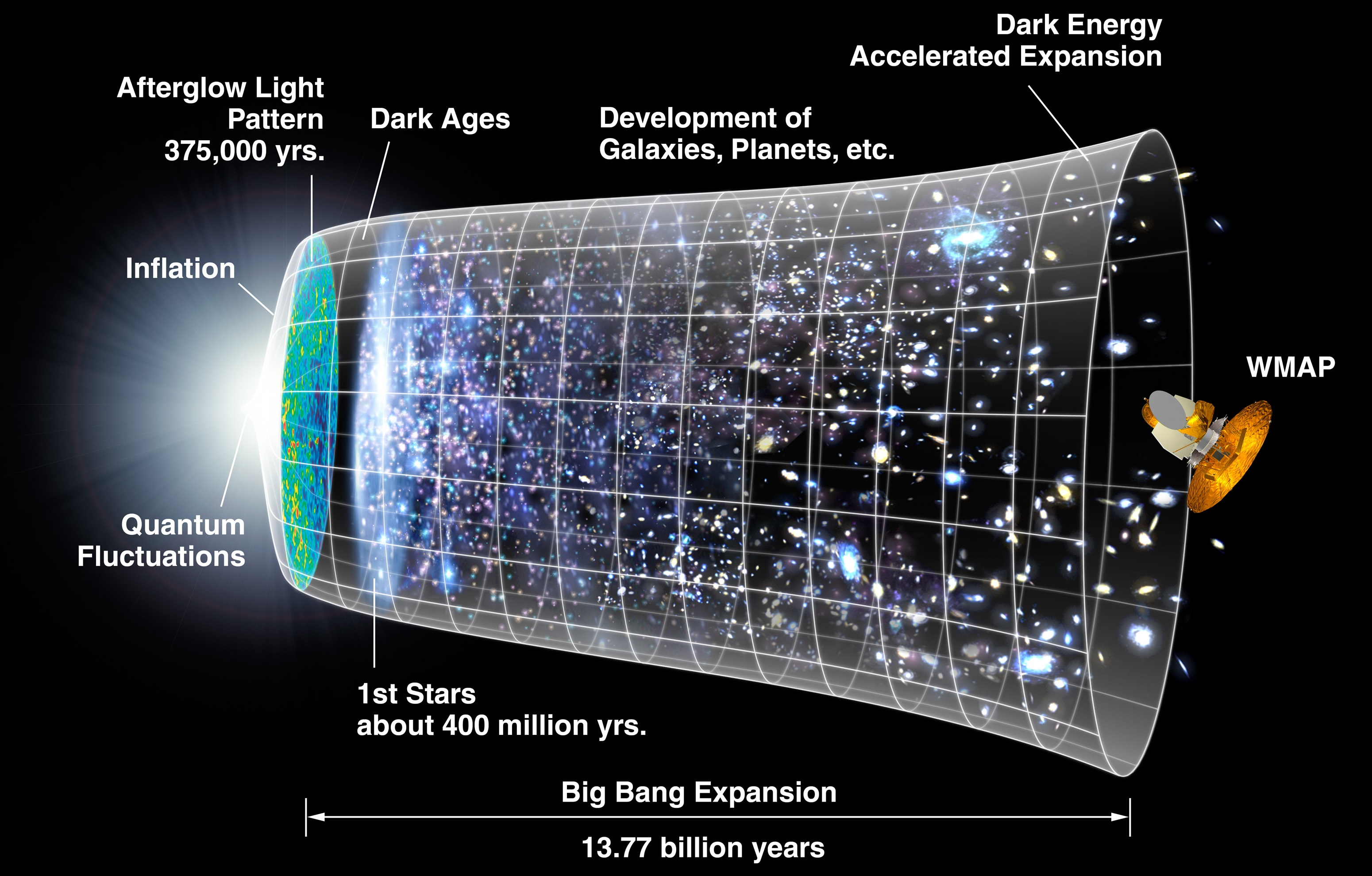
According to the standard model describing the expansion of the Universe since the Big Bang, there may be planets older than the Earth, capable of harboring supercivilizations.

In the article Cosmology and Civilizations published in 1997, Kardashev reiterates the need to carefully observe astronomical objects with strong radiation in order to detect supercivilizations. However, the discovery of a civilization at a stage of development similar to ours is unlikely. The existence of such supercivilizations is made possible by the fact that life on Earth is recent compared to the age of the Universe (8×10^{9} years before the formation of the Solar System). He then examines the conditions for the appearance of life on cosmological time scales. Assuming the rate of evolution of life on Earth and considering the age of the Universe, it is reasonable to assume that a civilization could have reached our level of technological development in 6×10^{9} years. Such civilizations can be observed in nearby regions, since the farther away we observe, the younger the objects are. Recent discoveries of sources of intense radiation deadly to life show that life could have flourished under cover for the time necessary for its appearance and maintenance. Another argument for the possibility of a very old supercivilization is that most of the objects that could be megastructures have not yet been discovered and mapped. In addition, 95% of the matter remains invisible or can only be inferred by the gravitational influence it produces.

According to Kardashev, it is essential to focus our search tools on new objects radiating at a wavelength of a few microns to a few millimeters, and at a temperature of 3 to 300 K, which is characteristic of large structures of solid matter. It would then be possible to detect structures belonging to Type II in our galaxy or in those nearby. Type III structures can also be observed at large cosmological distances. Kardashev recalls that a study was conducted on 3000 sources of the IRAS catalog from the four directions of the sky. Two temperature bands were targeted: from 110 to 120 K and from 280 to 290 K. The analysis showed that the 110–120 K sources are clustered in the Galactic plane and in its center. Kardashev explains that only more powerful observations in the infrared and submillimeter range can reveal possible artificial sources of radiation. He then refers to projects that he has proposed, in particular that of putting into orbit a cryogenic space telescope (the Millimetron Project).

According to Kardashev, these results, combined with those of other research on the age of certain cosmic objects, suggest that civilizations dating from 6 to 8 billion years ago may exist in our galaxy. It is likely that they have long since discovered our own civilization, a hypothesis that could answer the question posed by Enrico Fermi when he formulated his paradox: "Where are they?". Without the discovery of artificial sources, however, Shklovsky's theory that civilizations self-destruct as a result of large-scale social conflicts would be proven. Kardashev mentions another hypothesis that, in his opinion, is capable of explaining the dynamics of the supercivilizations: the "feedback effect" (theorized by Sebastian von Hoerner in 1975), which is based on the hypothesis that at a high technological level, civilizations tend to converge rather than to isolate themselves. The distance between supercivilizations could then be determined by half the time of the technological evolution of the oldest civilization, which would be about 3 to 4 billion years. On the other hand, this supercivilization may not have been present in our galaxy for a long time. Kardashev concludes by saying that since the expansion of the Universe is infinite, the number and lifetime of such supercivilizations are also infinite.

== Categories defined by Kardashev ==
The hypothetical classification, known as the Kardashev scale, distinguishes three stages in the evolution of civilizations according to the dual criteria of access and energy consumption. The purpose of this classification is to guide the search for extraterrestrial civilizations, particularly within SETI, in which Kardashev participated, and this on the assumption that a fraction of the energy used by each type is intended for communication with other civilizations. To make this scale more understandable, Lemarchand compares the speed at which a volume of information equivalent to 100,000 average-sized books can be transmitted across the galaxy. A Type II civilization can send this data using a transmission beam that lasts for only 100 seconds. A similar amount of information can be sent across intergalactic distances of about 10 million light-years, with a transmission time of several weeks. A Type III civilization can send the same amount of data to the entire observable universe with a transmission time of 3 seconds.

Kardashev's classification is based on the assumption of a growth rate of 1% per year. Kardashev believed that it would take humanity 3,200 years to reach Type II, and 5,800 years to reach Type III. However, Dr. Michio Kaku believes that humanity must increase its energy consumption by 3% per year to reach Type I in 100–200 years. These types are thus separated from each other by a growth rate of several billion.

=== Type I ===
A civilization "close to the level currently achieved on Earth, with an energy consumption of ≈ 4×10^{19} erg/s" (≈ 4×10^{12} watts). A Type I civilization is usually defined as one that can harness all the energy that reaches its home planet from its parent star (for Earth, this value is about 2×10^{17} watts), which is about four orders of magnitude higher than the amount currently achieved on Earth, with an energy consumption of ≈ 2×10^{13} watts by 2020. The astronomer Guillermo A. Lemarchand defined Type I as a level close to today's terrestrial civilization, with an energy capacity equivalent to Earth's solar irradiance, between 10^{16} and 10^{17} watts.

=== Type II ===
A civilization capable of harnessing the energy radiated by its own large star – for example, by successfully completing a Dyson sphere or Matrioshka brain – with an energy consumption of ≈ 4×10^{33} erg/s. Lemarchand defined such civilizations as being able to harness and channel the entire radiation output of their star. The energy consumption would then be comparable to the luminosity of the Sun, ≈ 4×10^{33} erg/s" (≈ 4×10^{26} watts).

=== Type III ===
A civilization with energy on the scale of its own galaxy, with an energy consumption of ≈ 4×10^{44} erg/s. Lemarchand defined civilizations of this type as having access to energy comparable to the luminosity of the entire Milky Way galaxy, about ≈ 4×10^{44} erg/s" (≈ 4×10^{37} watts).

In accordance with the data available at the time, Kardashev did not go beyond a Type III civilization. However, new types (0, IV, V, and VI) have been proposed.

== Reassessments of the Kardashev scale ==
=== Sagan's finer classification ===
In 1973, Carl Sagan discovered Kardashev's work on the classification of civilizations. He found that the differences between the types Kardashev identified were so great that they did not allow for the best possible modeling of the evolution of civilizations. Consequently, Sagan proposed a more refined classification, still based on Kardashev's types, but integrating intermediate levels using the following logarithmic interpolation formula:

$K = \frac{\log_{10}{W}-6} {10}$,

where K is the Kardashev type of a civilization and W is the amount of power it uses, in watts. Thus, a Type 1.1 civilization would be defined by a power of 10^{17} watts, while a Type 2.3 civilization would be able to harness 10^{29} watts.

Moreover, the above formula could be used to extrapolate beyond Kardashev's original types. For example, a Type 0 civilization, not defined by Kardashev, would control about 1 MW of power (equivalent to having around 100 campfires burning at any given time); on Earth, the emergence of Type 0 civilizations is roughly concurrent with the rise of civilization in a general sense.

Sagan estimated that, according to this revised scale, 1970s humanity would be Type 0.7 (about 10 terawatts), equivalent to 0.16% of the power available on Earth. This level is characterized, according to him, by the ability to self-destruct, which he calls "technological adolescence". In 2021, the total world energy consumption was 595.15 exajoules (165,319 TWh), equivalent to an average power consumption of 18.87 TW or a Kardashev rating of 0.73. (Note: To two significant figures on Sagan's interpolated Kardashev scale, as of 2021)

Sagan also suggests that, for completeness, an alphabetical scale should be added to indicate the level of social development, expressed in the amount of information available to the civilization. Thus, a Class A civilization would be based on 10^{6} bits of information (less than any recorded human culture), a Class B on 10^{7} bits, a Class C on 10^{8} bits, and so on. Humanity in 1973 would belong to the "0.7 H" class. According to Sagan, the first civilization with which humanity would come into contact could be between "1.5 J" and "1.8 K"; a galactic supercivilization would be at the "3 Q" stage, while a federation of galaxies could be at the "4 Z" stage. The information and energy axes are not strictly interdependent, so even a level Z civilization would not have to be Kardashev Type III. Sagan believed that no civilization had yet reached level Z, speculating that so much unique information would exceed that of all the intelligent species in a galactic supercluster, and observing that the universe is not old enough to exchange information effectively over large distances.

In 2017, the total amount of information generated on the internet was 26 zettabytes (with an estimated 120 zettabytes in 2023), equivalent to 0.73 R/S on Sagan's combined scale.

=== Kaku and the knowledge economy ===
In Physics of the Future (2011), American physicist Michio Kaku examines the conditions for humanity to converge on a Type I planetary civilization. This convergence is based primarily on the knowledge economy. Kaku uses the Kardashev scale, but develops it by adding an additional stage: a Type IV civilization would be able to draw the energy it needs from extragalactic radiation. By studying the evolution of technologies that have changed history (paper, the integrated circuit), Kaku believes that humanity is moving toward a civilization of planetary dimensions, the "starting point" of which is the Internet.

A Type I civilization consumes power on the order of thousands to millions of times our current planetary output, about 100 trillion trillion watts. It would have enough energy to manipulate the occurrence of certain natural phenomena, such as earthquakes or volcanoes, and could build cities on the oceans. We can see the beginnings of a Type I civilization in the fact that a global language is developing (English), a global communication system is emerging (the Internet), a global economic system is in the making (the establishment of the European Union), and even a globalized culture is standardizing humanity (mass media, television, rock music, and Hollywood movies). To achieve Type I, humanity must be able to communicate with the rest of the world and to focus on several areas: building infrastructure to facilitate communication and cooperation, education, research and development, and innovation, as well as building strong ties between diasporas and their countries of origin, and between migrants and non-migrants. If development fails, it is likely that the world will not be able to achieve Type II. If these areas do not develop, Kaku predicts that humanity will sink into the "abyss": an advanced civilization must grow faster than the frequency of occurrence of extinction-level cosmic catastrophes, such as comet or asteroid impacts. A Type I civilization should also be able to master space travel to deflect threatening objects. It would also have to anticipate the onset of ice ages and modify the climate long before they occur to avoid them.

In addition, in his books Hyperspace and Parallel Worlds, Michio Kaku has discussed a Type IV civilization that could harness "extragalactic" energy sources such as dark energy.

=== Zubrin's planet mastery ===
In Entering Space: Creating a Spacefaring Civilization, Robert Zubrin suggests another form: his definition of a Type I civilization is described as one that has achieved full mastery of the resources of its planet (global), a Type II of its solar system (interplanetary), and a Type III would have unleashed the full potential of the galaxy (starfaring civilization). Metrics other than pure energy consumption have also been proposed.

He ponders the possibility of a Type IV civilization, one that would dominate the universe, noting that there are limits to how minds can connect and interact on a galactic or intergalactic basis. As an example, he mentions that communication from the Galactic Center of the Milky Way galaxy to its edge would take about 50,000 years (since nothing can travel faster than light, according to our understanding of physics).

=== Barrow's microdimensional mastering ===
The astronomer John D. Barrow of the University of Sussex has hypothesized that there are other stages beyond Type III. These Type IV, V, or even VI civilizations would be able to manipulate cosmic structures (galaxies, galactic clusters, superclusters) and even escape the Big Crunch through holes in space.

Barrow also proposes an "anti-Kardashev scale": he observes that humans have found it more cost effective to extend their ability to manipulate their environment to smaller and smaller scales rather than to larger and larger ones. He, therefore, proposes a reverse classification, from Type I-minus to Type Omega-minus:

- Type I-minus is capable of manipulating objects on the scale of itself: building structures, mining, joining and breaking solids;
- Type II-minus is capable of manipulating genes and altering the development of living things, transplanting or replacing parts of themselves, reading and manipulating their genetic code;
- Type III-minus is capable of manipulating molecules and molecular bonds, creating new materials;
- Type IV-minus is capable of manipulating individual atoms, creating nanotechnology at the atomic level, and creating complex forms of artificial life;
- Type V-minus is capable of manipulating the atomic nucleus and engineering the nucleons that compose it;
- Type VI-minus is capable of manipulating the most elementary particles of matter (quarks and leptons) to create organized complexity among populations of elementary particles;
- Type Omega-minus is capable of manipulating the fundamental structure of space and time.

In Impossibility: The Limits of Science and the Science of Limits (1998), Barrow proposes a scale ranging from "BI" to "BVI", with an ultimate stage he calls "BΩ", the former characterized by the possibility of manipulating one's environment, while the latter allows for the modification of spacetime.

=== Galántai's miniaturization and resilience to catastrophes ===
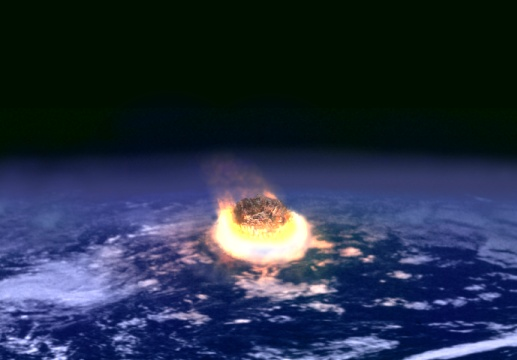
For Zoltan Galántai, a scale classifying civilizations should be based on their ability to survive catastrophes, particularly those of cosmic origin, such as an asteroid impact.

Zoltan Galántai recognizes the important role that Kardashev's classification has played in the SETI program, but he believes that another scale is possible, without using energy consumption, by resorting to miniaturization. The hypothesis of Donald Tarter, researcher at SETI, is that a civilization based on nanotechnology would not need an ever-increasing amount of energy. A Type I civilization that masters local space travel could colonize its planetary system and even the Oort cloud without needing an amount of energy that would make it Type II. This scale loses its meaning beyond Type II, since it is impossible to predict the evolution of civilizations over long distances in a galactic colonization process. Finally, Tarter states that the Kardashev scale is the product of an era of insufficient scientific knowledge, which considered the possibility of stellar object CTA-102 as an artificial Type III source, whereas today we know that it is a galactic nucleus.

In another article, Zoltan Galántai suggests considering another scale, no longer based on energy consumption, but on a civilization's ability to survive natural and cosmic disasters. Type I would describe a civilization capable of surviving a local natural disaster, like the Anasazi. A Type II civilization would have the means to withstand a regional or continental disaster, and finally Type III could face a global disaster such as an asteroid's impact, a supervolcano's eruption, or an ice age. Beyond the first three types are civilizations that have scattered throughout the galaxy. The Type IV civilization would still be vulnerable to some cosmic threats, while the Type V civilization would be technically immortal, as no cosmic catastrophe could reach it. The Kardashev scale can be a relevant tool for preventing catastrophes, whether human or natural, according to Richard Wilson, who relates this scale to the power of destruction, in TNT. A Type I civilization would use 25 megatons per second of equivalent TNT, a Type II civilization 4×10^{19} times more (4 billion hydrogen bombs per second), while a Type III civilization would use 10^{11} times more.

== Progression through the types ==
=== Towards type I ===
According to Carl Sagan, Type I should be reached around 2100.

Physicist and futurist Michio Kaku has suggested that, if humans increase their energy consumption at an average rate of 3 percent per year, they could reach Type I status in 100–200 years, Type II status in a few thousand years, and Type III status in 100,000 to a million years.

Physicist Freeman Dyson has calculated that Type I should be reached in about 200 years, while Richard Carrigan has estimated that the Earth is just four-tenths of the way to Type I on the Sagan scale. If Type I is reached soon (in the year 3000 for Richard Wilson), it would be accompanied by profound social upheavals, but also by a significant risk of self-destruction.

According to Per Calissendorff, energy consumption cannot be the main parameter to explain the transition from one type to another. Civilizations must have the means to maintain their growth rate despite climatic conditions and major natural disasters, even on the cosmic scale. A civilization moving towards Type II must have mastered space travel, interplanetary communication, stellar engineering, and climate. It must also have developed a planetary communication system, such as the Internet. For Michio Kaku, the only serious threat to a Type II civilization would be the explosion of a nearby supernova, while no known cosmic catastrophe would be capable of wiping out a Type III civilization.

According to Philip T. Metzger, humanity has reached Type I, but faces an energy challenge. In his 2011 paper Nature's Way of Making Audacious Space Projects Viable, he states that the Earth's non-renewable energy sources are nearly exhausted; natural gas will be depleted by 2020–2030, coal by 2035, uranium by 2056, while oil production peaked in 2006–2008. Nuclear energy cannot fully meet the world's energy needs (it represented only 6% in 2011). In addition, renewable energy cannot meet the growing demand for energy. Most of the minerals used by humans are in danger of becoming scarce; 11 minerals are already classified as having passed their peak production. For Metzger, humanity must therefore undertake a "100-year project" aimed at building a spacecraft ("100 Year Starship") capable of accessing the vast energy resources of the Solar System. For Metzger, it is even probable that if extraterrestrials coveted the energy resources of our Solar System, they would not look for them on Earth, but on the various asteroids and planetoids. Robotics is the only way to access so many dispersed resources, and humanity should embark on a second long-term project, which Metzger calls the "robotsphere", that would begin with the energetic exploitation of the Moon (estimated at 2.3×10^{12} J/year). This first step would make it possible to reach Type II in 53 years. Then the robotsphere (self-replicating and self-learning automated probes) would extend to the rest of the Solar System. Current advances in artificial intelligence suggest that the foundations of a robotsphere could be reached early in the next century, beginning in 2100. Metzger sees eight benefits for humanity in building the 100 Year Starship, including zero launch costs because the spacecraft will be built in space by robots that can do so with little human assistance (drastically reducing manufacturing costs), the creation of a Solar System-wide economy, and the use of resources from celestial objects and possibly terraforming them.

=== Towards type II ===
Viorel Badescu and Richard Cathcart have studied the possibility that a Type II civilization could use a 450 million kilometer device to direct solar radiation and thus be able to impart a kinetic motion to its star that deviates it from its usual trajectory by about 35 to 40 parsecs, allowing it, among other things, to capture its energy and navigate the galaxy.

For Claude Semay, "a Type II civilization could be detected at great distances (by what is called "astro-technical leakage"), provided that it is not located in a region of the galaxy that is too distant from us, or that it does not occupy a location that is obscured from us by clouds of gas or dust".

=== Towards type III ===
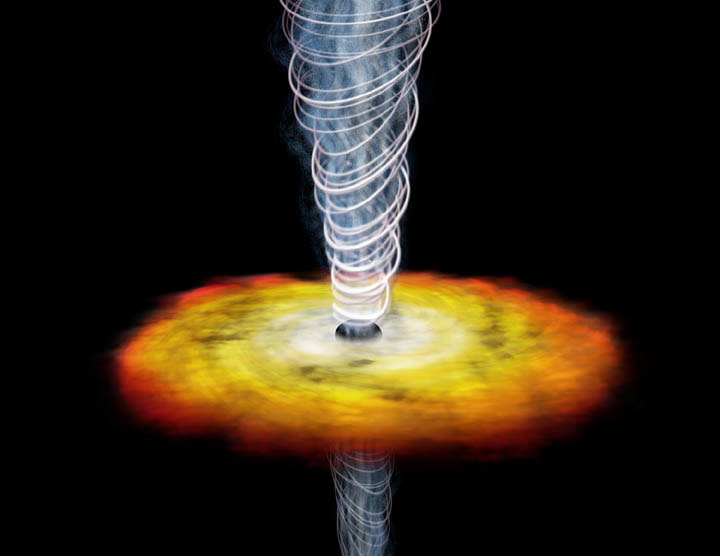
Artist's view of quasar GB1508. A highly evolved Kardashev "Type III" civilization could draw its energy from such a source.

A Type III civilization should be detectable because of the large amount of radiation captured on a galaxy-wide scale. Calissendorff suggests using 75% of the total light emitted by a galaxy to determine that a Type III civilization uses many Dyson spheres. If only three or four of these spheres occupy the galaxy, it does not necessarily mean that the civilization has reached Type III, and it may still be in transition; however, such civilizations may remain beyond the reach of our understanding and instruments.

Semay observes that "a Type III civilization should not be confused with what science fiction writers call a 'galactic empire'", knowing that it can only exist if interstellar travel is achieved. Semay argues that there is no evidence that this will ever be possible. Based on Dyson's calculations, Semay believes that such a journey would take three centuries, with an average distance between stars of about 7 light years. Overall, the speed of the colonization front, which ranges from 4×10^{−4} to 5×10^{−3} light-years/year, would result in humanity spreading throughout the galaxy in a period of 16 to 200 million. "A Type III civilization, having thus "domesticated" its galaxy by building a large number of Dyson spheres, would be detectable over intergalactic distances of several million light-years."

A Type III civilization could theoretically live inside a supermassive black hole, in a stable periodic orbit, which would make it completely undetectable, according to V. I. Dokuchaev.

=== Towards type IV ===
Zoltan Galántai notes that neither Kardashev nor Sagan thought to extend the scale and define a Type IV (which would use the energy of an entire universe). They simply did not envision a civilization capable of manipulating its environment on the largest possible scale (about 14 billion parsecs). The concept of a Type IV supercivilization approaches divine possibilities, enabling the creation of, and travel through, alternate universes of such a civilization's own design, although the latter possibility is reserved for a Type V civilization by Carrigan. The fraction of energy captured by a civilization capable of powering itself on a black hole could also be used to classify civilizations.

== Possible scenarios ==
According to Kardashev, the most important parameters to define the existence of a civilization are three: the presence of very powerful energy sources, the use of non-standard technologies, and the transmission of significant amounts of information of various kinds through space.

=== Energy sources ===
Kardashev's classification is based on the hypothesis that an advanced civilization uses significant energy, which implies that it must be de facto detectable over long distances, as summarized by Zoltan Galántai. For Kardashev, the limit of a civilization's energy consumption is originally located in the region of the electromagnetic spectrum from 10^{6} to 10^{8} Hz, which allows two observations related to thermodynamics. First, all the energy consumed is inevitably converted into heat. Second, this energy can only be dissipated in the form of radiation scattered in space. These two findings are the pillars of Kardashev's theory that cosmic objects with strong radiation could be artificial sources. He also considered the possibility of detecting an artificial source by emphasizing the spectral line of hydrogen in its use for nuclear fusion.

Dutil and Dumas consider several physical limits to continuous energy production, such as photosynthesis (about 10 TW), climate (about 127 TW), and solar flux (174,000 TW). The only inexhaustible source of energy that can sustain a civilization for over several billion years, is deuterium (used in nuclear fusion). The sustainability of a civilization must therefore involve "strict control of the exploitation of available resources"; this difficulty in exceeding energy limits may explain the fact that the vast majority of civilizations fail to engage in a space colonization project.

Astrophysicist Makoto Inoue and economist Hiromitsu Yokoo have explored the possibility that a Type III civilization could extract energy from a supermassive black hole (SMBH). The captured energy could meet the extraordinary needs of a civilization that requires about 4×10^{44} ergs/s. The energy would be captured in the form of radiation emitted by the matter rushing into the star, by means of collectors located within the accretion disk. These collectors are similar to Dyson spheres. The overflow, as well as the waste of the civilization, would be redirected towards the black hole. A fraction of this energy, directed as a high-powered beam, could be useful for space travel. A galactic club of civilizations could transmit the energy through networks within the galaxy. Within the various central power stations that make up the network, power transmission is periodically switched between transmitter and receiver, according to the galactic rotation. To be efficient, this network should be located at the center of the galaxy.

=== The technology ===
This parameter is one of the most undetectable in the Universe due to the fact that solid matter structures are at low temperatures and emit weak radiation. Their luminosity, which is difficult to observe, also makes it impossible to observe them with telescopes. Likewise, we cannot detect them by their gravitational effects. However their existence can be detected by analyzing wavelengths between 8 and 13 microns, corresponding to surface temperatures of 300 K. A hypothetical Dyson sphere could thus be detected, provided that the observation is made from space. Locally, the significant dip in luminosity that would result from a giant Dyson sphere (or "Fermi bubble") would allow the detection of a Type III civilization.

A megastructure like a Dyson sphere could be the result of a technology based on self-replicating probes, as those imagined by von Neumann. A Type III civilization would have the means to disperse a significant number of these spheres throughout the galaxy, which would have the effect of attenuating the light emitted by the galaxy. Kaku also considers this to be the most efficient method of colonizing space. For example, a galaxy 100,000 light years in diameter would be explored in half a million years. Paul Davies has suggested that a civilization could colonize the galaxy by scattering miniature probes, no larger than the palm of a hand, using nanotechnology. This thesis is realistic, he explains, because it is obvious that the technology is becoming increasingly miniaturized and proportionally less expensive.

Type II megastructures would be easier to detect. This would be the case of a Dyson sphere used as a "stellar engine", as well as the contribution of heavy elements. Similarly, "Shkadov thrusters", which would produce a lateral thrust of 4.4 parsecs on their star by reflecting solar radiation through a structure made of mirrors, would be observable objects. This device would break the symmetry of solar radiation and counteract gravitational forces, allowing a Type II civilization to move its home solar system through space. Drake and Shklovski have also considered the possibility of "seeding" a star (Stellar salting) by artificially adding extremely rare elements such as technetium or promethium. Such an intervention in a star's composition would be detectable.

It is still possible that humanity could discover traces of lost Type I, II, or III civilizations. The search for material traces of such civilizations (e.g. Dyson spheres or stellar engines), an "interesting alternative" to the conventional SETI program, lays the foundation for a "cosmic archaeology" according to Richard A. Carrigan. Efforts to detect intelligence markers in the atmospheres of exoplanets (such as freon, oxygen, or even ozone, residues of biotic activity according to James Lovelock's research) are one of the most promising avenues. A civilization watching its star die (as a red giant, for example) could have tried to prolong its existence through megastructures that should be detectable. The possible traces could be nuclear remnants, to be sought within the spectral types going from A5 to F2 according to Whitmire and Wright. It could also be a change in the isotopic ratio, due to a stellar engine, or an unusual spectral modulation in the composition of the star.

=== The interstellar transmission of information ===
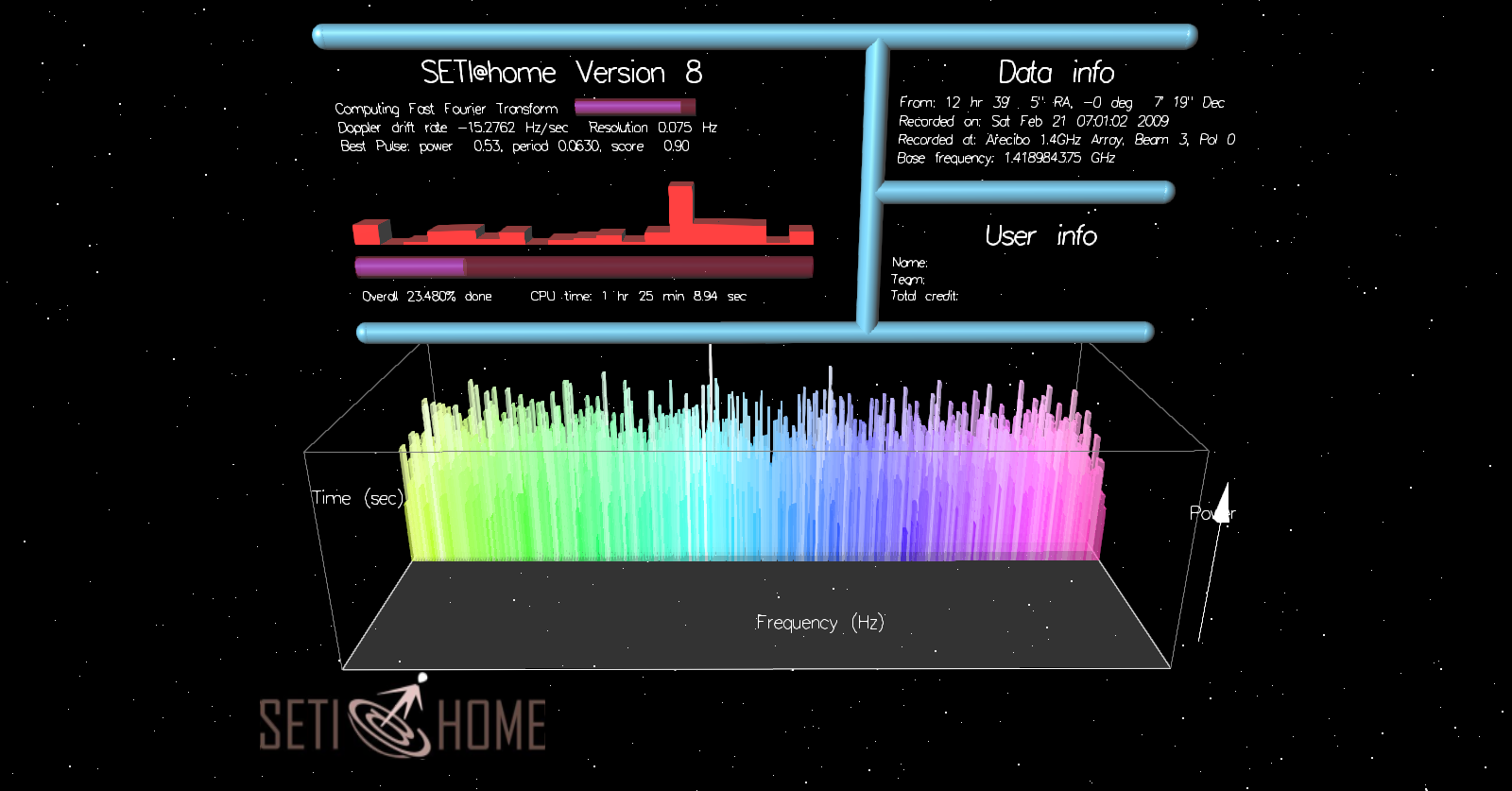
A screenshot of the SETI@home computer program

According to Kardashev, the transmissions of an extraterrestrial civilization (what SERENDIP is looking for) can be divided into two types. On the one hand, there can be an exchange of information between highly developed civilizations or civilizations at similar stages of evolution. On the other hand, the transmission of information can be aimed at raising the level of other less developed civilizations. If supercivilizations do exist, the transmissions of the first type must remain inaccessible to our observation because they must be unidirectional and not be directed toward the Solar System. Conversely, those of the second type must be easily detectable by our listening devices.

A signal of artificial origin should contain more than 10 and less than 100 bits. The latter would be of two types: transient and stable. Several criteria allow us to distinguish a signal of artificial origin from others. First, the optimal region of the spectrum to host artificial signals is the one where the temperature of the cosmic microwave background is the lowest. Second, artificial sources must have a minimum angular size. The presence of suspicious data in other regions of the spectrum (such as circular polarization, radio and optical frequencies, or X-ray emissions) can confirm that it is an intelligent transmission. Two sources among those studied have parameters close to those expected: 1934-63 and 3C 273B.

For L. M. Gindilis, there are two criteria for a signal to be called artificial: one related to the artificial nature of the source and the other related to a particular radiation, intentionally designed to ensure communication and facilitate detection. Only Type II or III civilizations can communicate using isotropic transmissions that allow omnidirectional reception. In a 1 MHz band (which requires about 10^{24} watts), detection of signals from a Type II civilization is possible up to 1,000 light-years away, while signals from a Type III civilization are detectable virtually throughout the observable Universe. However, building an omnidirectional transmitter powerful enough to transmit over a range of 1,000 light years would take several million years. According to V.S. Troitsky, the energy required and the limitations in its production would be two obstacles to completing this project in a reasonable time.

For Zoltan Galántai, we would not be able to distinguish between an intelligent extraterrestrial signal and a signal of natural origin. Therefore, he does not believe that Type II, III or even IV civilizations can be detected. Even if humanity reaches Type IV, it will not be able to detect another supercivilization of a similar level, and we will consider their changes in the universe to be the result of natural causes. Thus, there may be many Type IV civilizations in the universe, but none of them will be able to detect the others. Moreover, the dimensions of the universe make these supercivilizations like islands far from the others, which Dyson defines as a "Carroll Universe".

For Alexander L. Zaitsev, the radio transmission of interstellar messages (IRM) is the most likely method used by civilizations. Planetary radio telescopes and those installed on asteroids would make it possible to listen to the many messages that could be sent to us. In 2007, the SETI program analyzed the only television frequencies sent by a Type 0 civilization, notes Michio Kaku. Therefore, our galaxy may have communications from Type II and III civilizations, but our listening devices can only detect Type 0 messages.

== Search and detection of civilizations ==
=== The Byurakan Conference (1964) ===
From 1962, Kardashev was a member of a SETI research group at the Sternberg Astronomical Institute in Moscow. In 1964, he organized the first Soviet conference on the possibility of extraterrestrial civilizations, which was held at the Byurakan astrophysical observatory in Armenia. This national conference was held in response to the American seminar known as the Green Bank conference of 1961, which was held at the Green Bank observatory in the United States. It brought together radio astronomers with the aim of "finding rational technical and linguistic solutions to the problem of communication with an extraterrestrial civilization that is more advanced than the Earth's civilization". Kardashev presented his classification, while Troitskii announced that it was possible to detect signals from other galaxies.

For Kardashev, "in the next 5 to 10 years, all the sources of radiation with the largest observable flux, in all the regions of the electromagnetic spectrum, will have been discovered and studied", the sensitivity of the listening devices having indeed reached their technical limits. According to him, the entire electromagnetic spectrum will be known and, consequently, the list of the objects that could be artificial sources could thus be extended. The search for artificial signals will then have to concentrate on objects of maximum luminosity or radiation belonging to a certain region of the spectrum, but also on objects of significant mass, and on those that represent the essence of matter in the Universe. As early as 1971, Kardashev considered that this observation requires the preparation of a plan of listening and analysis, which will allow the success of the search for extraterrestrial civilizations. Humanity will then be able to solve the "main dilemma", as it was stated by Enrico Fermi. This dilemma is, according to the Soviet astronomer, is certainly connected with our lack of information and knowledge.

Kardashev believes that a research project like Ozma is incapable of detecting a Type I civilization (an idea also promoted by Kaplan in 1971), and that SETI should instead focus on searching for intense radio signals that could emanate from active Type II or III civilizations. To prove the effectiveness of this approach, Kardashev therefore turned his attention to two radio sources discovered by the California Institute of Technology, nicknamed CTA-21 and CTA-102. Subsequently, Gennadii Borisovich Sholomitskii then used the Russian astronomical research station to study the data from CTA-102. He found that this radio source is characterized by its variability. Kardashev then considered that this could be an indication of an artificial emission source, albeit of rather short life span.

=== Towards a "physical eschatology" ===
The knowledge of these hypothetical supercivilizations must fit into a wide range of physical laws that contain the entirety of our current knowledge, since the technical and scientific developments of mankind can be considered as an inevitable and necessary stage in the process of the evolution of a civilization. Based on this principle, Kardashev proposes to define several concepts applicable to extraterrestrial civilizations. The physical laws, which are universal, can be used as a common basis for understanding other civilizations and, in particular, allow us to develop an objective research program. Michio Kaku also believes that the evolution of civilizations obeys the "iron laws of physics" and in particular the laws of thermodynamics, those of stable matter (baryonic matter) and those of planetary evolution (probability of occurrence of natural or cosmic catastrophes). The anthropic principle also makes it possible to predict the sociological characteristics at the basis of any civilization.

However, these universal laws are not the only parameters to consider. Zoltan Galántai explains that "it is impossible to calculate the future of the Universe over long periods of time without including the effects of life and intelligence", a position close to that of Freeman Dyson. Taking into account these two phenomena, the universal physical laws and the intelligence resulting from life, defines a "physical eschatology", as Galántai puts it. This approach began in the 1970s with the work of Kardashev, and then physical eschatology gradually interested a number of scientists and thinkers, notes Dyson.

=== A functional definition of civilization ===
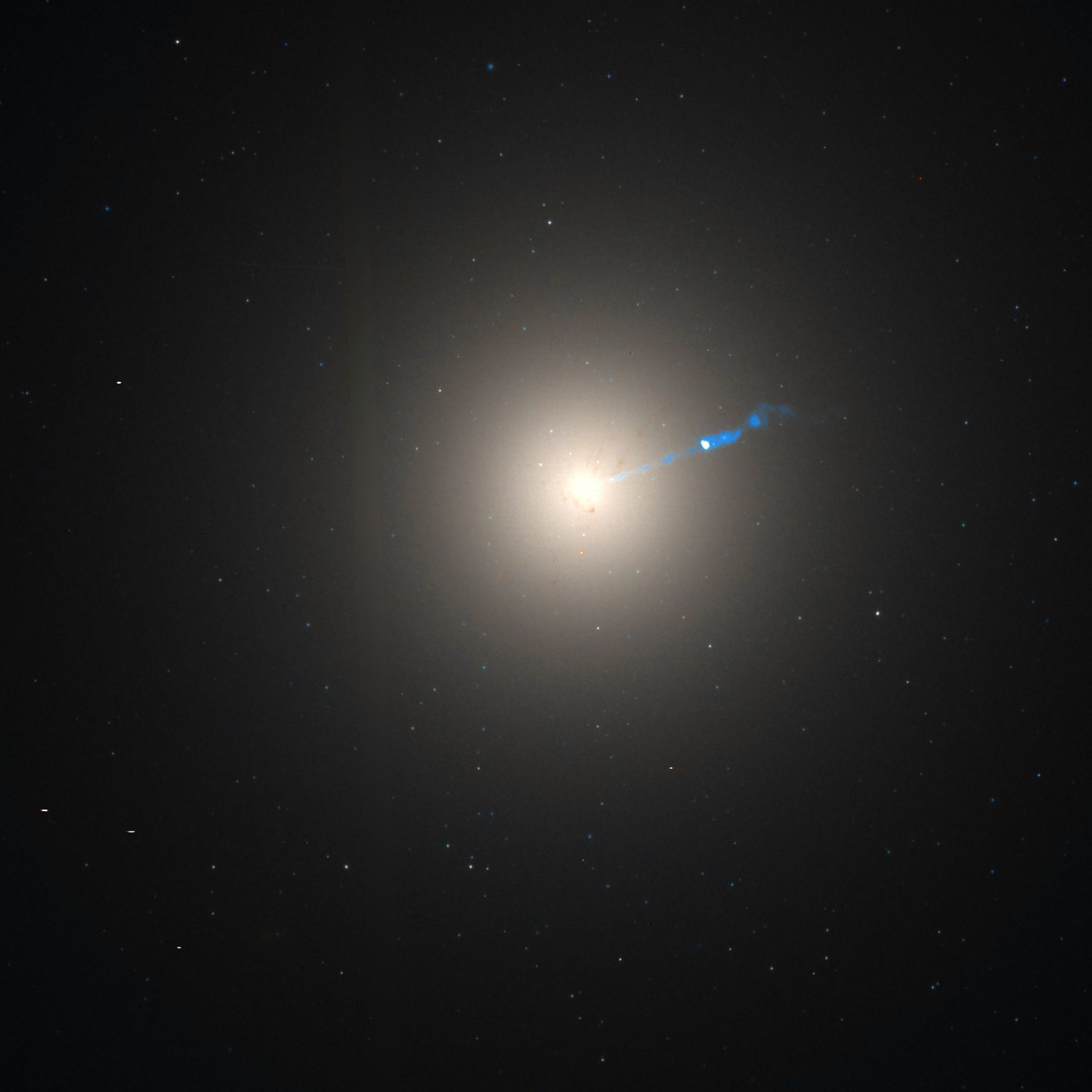
Galaxy M87 has an active galactic nucleus, providing a strong source of radiation in all wavelengths. This type of radiation was considered by Kardashev to be one of the possible signals of an advanced civilization.

Observation of the development of living organisms shows that they are characterized by the tendency to store a maximum amount of information, both about the environment and about themselves. This information then leads to an abstract analysis, which plays an important role in the development of life forms. Thus, Kardashev defines civilization from a functional perspective as "a state of very stable matter capable of acquiring, abstractly analyzing and applying information in order to extract data about the environment and itself, in order to develop survival reactions ". However, this functional definition of civilization implies that it cannot have a goal or end, since it is based on the principle of accumulating more and more information. Taking up von Hoerner's categories, Kardashev sees four possible scenarios for the development of civilizations:

1. Total destruction of life.
2. Destruction of only intelligent life.
3. Degeneration.
4. Loss of interest.

However, he refuses to see these as inevitable ends. But the assumption that the only limit to the development of a civilization can be the existence of a finite amount of information, in all areas, is also false, since it is highly improbable that information in the Universe is infinite. Given these two hypotheses, Kardashev argues that there is no universal civilization (supercivilization) because highly developed civilizations lose interest in space exploration. In any case, and despite the problem of the end of civilizations, he concludes, in the light of his functional definition of the advanced civilization, that the latter must use mass and energy on fantastic scales. According to him, there is no reason to denounce the hypothesis that the expansion of the Universe would not be an effect of the intelligent activity of a supercivilization.

=== Human civilization: a model for extrapolation ===
Kardashev poses the following question: "Is it possible to describe the development of a civilization in general terms over large cosmological periods?" Now many of the fundamental parameters that characterize the development of civilization on Earth are growing exponentially. In the field of energy, astronomer Don Goldsmith estimated that the Earth receives about one billionth of the Sun's energy, and that humans use about one millionth of it. So we consume about one millionth of a billionth of the Sun's total energy. Since human expansion is exponential, we can determine how long it will take for humanity to go from Type II to Type III according to Michio Kaku.

Thus, the rate of development of our own world remains the only criterion for extrapolating the state of civilizations older than humanity. The same is true for social values and basic needs according to Ashkenazi. Therefore, the time to double technical knowledge is about 10 years, and to double energy output, available reserves, and population is about 25 years. Two scenarios are then possible: spatial expansion or energy stagnation, the latter being possible only for 125 years, according to Kardashev, using the following relationship $\alpha = 1.04$:

$$t = \frac{\log \left(P/P_o\right)}{\log \alpha}$$

where $t$ is the number of years, $P$ is a parameter that increases annually as a function of $P_o$ and of $t$ according to $P = P_o \alpha^t$ and $\alpha$, a growth rate.

If $\alpha = 1.04$, then humanity's energy consumption will exceed the incident solar power (1.742×10^{17} W) after 240 years, the total power of the Sun (3.826×10^{26} W) after 800 years, and that of the Galaxy (7.29×10^{36} W) after 1,500 years. (Note: "If the growth rate a = 1.04 is maintained after the critical period, the human power output will exceed the quantity of incident solar radiation after 240 years, after 800 years the total energy radiated by the Sun will be exceeded, and after 1500 years we will exceed the total radiation output of the entire Galaxy'.") Based on this calculation, Zuckerman estimates the number of civilizations that could exist in our galaxy at 10,000. Kardashev concludes that the current exponential growth is a transitional phase in the development of a civilization, and that it is inevitably limited by natural factors. In fact, he believes that the required mass and energy will continue to grow exponentially for another 1,000 years. Civilization is thus defined by an exponential rate of increase. Humanity as a model for thinking about the development of extraterrestrial civilizations has its limitations, which can be truly overcome by a multidisciplinary approach according to the work of Kathryn Denning.

=== Research conducted ===
In 1963, Nikolai Kardashev and Gennady Borissovich Sholomitskii studied the CTA 102 radio source on the 920 MHz band from the Crimea Deep Space Station, looking for signs of a Type III civilization. CTA 102 had been discovered by Sholomitskii a year earlier, and Kardashev quickly saw it as a possible artificial source to study in order to validate his classification. The observation lasted until February 1965, and on April 12, Sholomitskii announced to the press (via the Russian ITAR-TASS) that Soviet astronomers had discovered a signal that could be of extraterrestrial origin. On April 14, he gave a conference in Moscow where he repeated his announcement; but by November 1964, two American astronomers had identified CTA 102 as a quasar, and their publication definitively closed the "CTA 102 case". It was the study of this source that had led to the Byurakan conference in 1964.

In 1975 and 1976, the American astronomers Frank Drake and Carl Sagan searched at Arecibo for signs of Type II civilizations in four galaxies of the Local Group: M33, M49, Leo I and Leo II. The year before, the two men had sent mankind's first message to M13. The results were published as "The Search for Extraterrestrial Intelligence" in Scientific American in May 1975.

In 1976, Kardashev, Troitskii, and Gindilis used the RATAN-600 radio telescope in the North Caucasus to search for signals from Type II or III civilizations in the Milky Way and other nearby galaxies. The radio telescope was built in 1966 under the supervision of Gindilis to listen at centimeter wavelengths.

In 1987, Tarter, Kardashev, and Slysh used the VLA to detect possible infrared sources near the galactic center from the IRAS telescope catalog. All three were looking for evidence of hypothetical Dyson spheres. The objects turn out to be OH/IR type stars.

A small-scale search for possible Type III sources was conducted by James Annis in 1999 and published in the Journal of the British Interplanetary Society under the title "Placing a limit on star-fed Kardashev type III civilizations". An astrophysicist at Fermilab (US), Annis studied a sample of 31 galaxies, both spiral and elliptical, using the Tully-Fisher diagram, in which the absolute magnitude is a function of the galaxies' rotational speed. Annis suggested that 75% of the least luminous objects (i.e., those with a decrease in absolute magnitude of 1.5 compared to the diagram) could be considered as possible candidates. However, no object with this characteristic is observed in his survey. On the other hand, Annis uses the available astronomical data to estimate the probability that a Type III civilization could exist. He shows that the average time that could allow for the emergence of such a civilization is 300 billion years, so none can exist in our present Universe.

Per Calissendorff conducted a study on a sample of spiral galaxies from two databases: 4,861 from the Spiral Field I-band (SFI++ catalog compiled by Springob et al. in 2005) and 95 from that of Reyes et al. in 2011. The same procedure was followed as in Annis, but the sample of galaxies used is 80 times larger than that used in the Annis study. Some sources were classified as "lopsided": they appear asymmetric in shape, meaning that one side of the galactic disc is more massive and less luminous than the other. This characteristic, according to Calissendorff, could be an indication that the galaxy is home to a civilization that has placed Dyson spheres in its main part. This can be explained by the fact that the colonization starts from one side of the galactic disk, making it appear darker and leading a distant observer to believe that the core has moved to that same side. On the other hand, a galaxy hosting Dyson spheres should be characterized by a significant source of far-infrared radiation. The fact remains that a Type III civilization can consume energy through a Dyson sphere without surrounding a star. Indeed, such megastructures could also extract energy from a black hole, according to the study by Inoue and Yokoo (2011). However, such a structure would not reduce the luminosity of an observed galaxy. Calissendorff's study concludes that 11 of the sources analyzed (out of a catalog of 2,411 galaxies, or 0.46%) show possible evidence of a Type III civilization. Searching for objects that obscure 90% of the light leaves only one source remains that meets the criteria. These positive sources show a low redshift (so they are old, about 100 million years), which is consistent with possible Type III civilizations, that could have flourished only in the early past. To have a better chance of detecting Type III artificial sources, Calissendorff suggests taking several photographs in a row, fast enough to fix the movement of turbulence in the atmosphere, applying different photometric filters and looking for dark areas (the case of a Dyson sphere being assembled by a Type II civilization), or analyzing the infrared spectrum of galaxies. A much larger sample of objects should be studied.

=== Observational evidence ===
In 2015, a study of galactic mid-infrared emissions concluded that "Kardashev Type III civilizations are either very rare or do not exist in the local Universe".

In 2016, Paul Gilster, author of the Centauri Dreams website, described a signal apparently coming from the star HD 164595 as requiring the power of a Type I or Type II civilization, if produced by extraterrestrial lifeforms. In August 2016, however, it was discovered that the origin of the signal was most likely a military satellite orbiting the Earth.

=== Possible listening criteria ===
==== Kardashev's point of view ====
According to Kardashev, humanity's ignorance of the physical possibilities of communication through space is great. Only a negligible fraction of the electromagnetic spectrum as an existing source of information in the universe is known. Thus, of the 89% of information that humans lack, 42% concerns the range from 10^{9} to 10^{14} Hz (centimetric, millimetric, submillimetric and infrared waves) and 25% concerns the range from 10^{15} to 10^{18} Hz (ultraviolet radiation and X-rays). Kardashev distinguishes two categories of listening areas: objects emitting in a broad frequency spectrum and objects emitting on the contrary in a narrow spectral line, the second category posing much more theoretical problems than the first, while being central, both for astrophysics and for the search for extraterrestrial civilizations.

Despite advances in astrophysics, the available information is still insufficient to prove the absence of supercivilizations, based on the inability to observe signs of activity. However, because of the possibility that there are planetary systems much older than the Solar System, and considering that cosmic objects such as quasars could be products of supercivilization activity, a detailed program of listening and searching for intelligent signs remains valid. This program includes:

- Monitoring the sky at 3, 10, 30, 100 and 300 microns, especially at 1, 3, and 10 mm, in order to identify one hundred of the most powerful sources among those observed and at each frequency;
- Study in detail the properties of quasars and other unusual objects;
- Search for monochromatic anomalies among the most powerful radio sources (such as a hydroxyl emission line), in the decimeter band;
- Search for periodic signals (pulsars) of interstellar origin, in the same band;
- Searches for monochromatic signals of different frequencies, always in the same band.

According to Kardashev, only a radio interferometer with a base, either of the order of or larger than the diameter of the Earth, placed in orbital space, would allow listening to centimetric and decimetric frequencies. Once a set of unusual sources has been selected, the next step is to look for significant content in the radiations from these objects. In 1998, Nikolai Kardashev, S. F. Likhachev, and V. I. Zhuravlev proposed two SETI space projects to detect artificial sources: the Millimetron project (an orbiting observatory with a 10 m diameter mirror) and the VLBI optical telescope (for interferometric synthesis of ultraviolet, optical, and infrared images).

==== Other leads ====
For Samuil Aronovich Kaplan, "the most reliable criterion" remains the small angular diameter of the radio source. The wavelength of 21 cm, privileged since 1959, according to the study of Cocconi and Morrison, is not the only listening region. Kaplan, in 1971, also mentioned the radio region of the spectrum, characterized by the hydroxyl radical (OH). For Livio, the means of detection should focus on globular clusters, the regions most likely to harbor planets similar to the Earth.

For Guillermo A. Lemarchand, extraterrestrial civilizations should not use an omnidirectional transmitter. Instead, they should look for signals of weak information, intermittent and unidirectional. They will certainly need to use interferometry to inspect planetary systems where life might appear. From Earth, it would be possible to pick up such signals at distances of up to 35 + (t_f - 2000) / 2, where t_f is the observation date in years, knowing that t_f ≥ 2000. However, there are many techniques for transmitting an interstellar message, ranging from bosons to particles and even antiparticles.

An artificial source located in the accretion disk of a supermassive black hole would be undetectable by the beams used to transmit the collected energy. In fact, the probability of detecting a beam of one micron arc-second is less than 10^{−23}. Moreover, the energy emitted by the black hole would not allow detection of the energy used by the Type III civilization. On the other hand, the specular reflection system of the radiation could be detected by the shadow it casts on the accretion disk.

A Type III civilization using a "Fermi bubble" would be detectable by the fact that it decreases the luminosity of a region of the galaxy. An infrared observation would make it possible to highlight it, especially in elliptical galaxies, Annis suggests.

=== Unusual objects ===
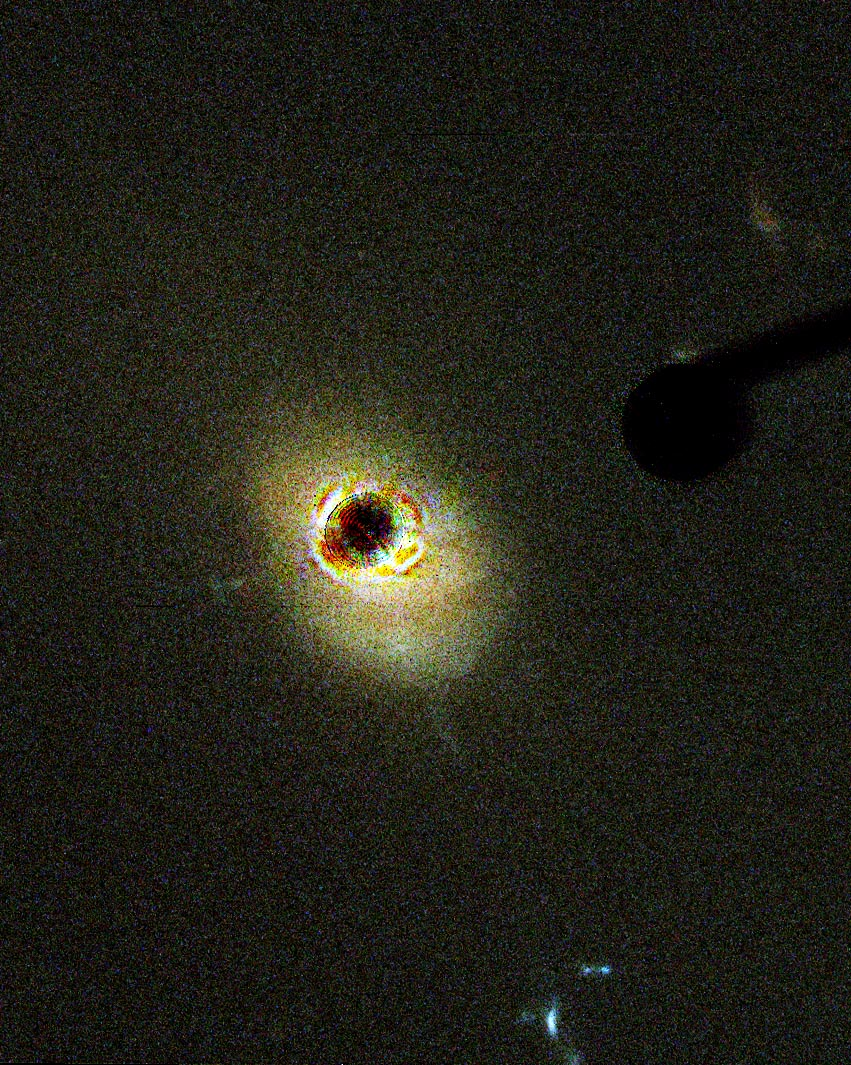
Quasar 3C 273, the brightest ever observed

The quasar 3C 9 is cited by Kardashev as early as 1971. The study of the quasar 3C 273 shows that it has a solid structure. Other quasars (3C 279, 3C 345, 3C 84) have properties close to those expected from an artificial source, especially since the emissions are powerful in the intermediate region of the spectrum (between radio and optical frequencies). Quasars are potential artificial sources, especially since their age corresponds to the technical possibilities of supercivilizations. Radio sources at the center of galaxies can also be artificial sources, according to Kardashev, even if in 2013 they were proven to be supermassive black holes. In 1971, Kardashev believed that the objects most likely to be artificial sources could be discovered in the [then] next few years.

The extraordinary periodicity of pulsar emissions was already considered an artificial source in 1968 by Antony Hewish, the discoverer of the first pulsar (CP 19019). The press of the time nicknamed this object "LGM-1" (for "little green men"), following the clumsiness of Hewish, who did not wait for the necessary verifications. Kaplan, in 1971, removed the pulsar from the list of objects that could be a source of artificial origin.

In 2011, James and Dominic Benford examined the possibilities that exist to distinguish pulsars from possible artificial sources emitting intelligent signals, such as: bandwidth (signals of about 100 MHz could be artificial), pulse length (to reduce costs, the pulse should be short) and frequency (about 10 GHz, also for economic reasons). The radio source PSR J1928+15 (observed in 2005 near the Galactic disk, at a frequency of 1.44 GHz, at Arecibo) could be of extraterrestrial origin. James and Dominic Benford consider three scenarios in which the cost factor is taken into account. If the source is cost-optimized, it belongs to a civilization of Type 0.35 (the Earth being of Type 0.73). If it is not cost-optimized and operates with a small antenna, the Type is 0.86. With a large antenna, it would be from a Type 0.66. Using this cost/efficiency method, it can be estimated that low-intensity sources may be the most prevalent, but also the most difficult to observe.

== Criticisms of the classification ==
William I. Newman and Carl Sagan believe that the growth of energy consumption alone cannot describe the evolution of civilizations; it is also necessary to consider population growth, and in particular the fact that it can be limited by the transport capacity of interplanetary means of travel. They conclude that there can be no ancient civilizations of galactic dimensions, nor galactic empires, although the possibility of networks of colonized worlds (of about 5 to 10 planets) is strong.

The scale theorized by Kardashev was born in the geopolitical context of the Cold War, in which energy had supreme value. According to Guillermo A. Lemarchand, a physicist at the University of Buenos Aires, there are four arguments against Kardashev's classification:

1. Long-range omnidirectional transmitters would be very energy-intensive. Using directional or intermittent devices, each pointing in a different direction, would require much less energy. Type II or III civilizations might therefore be defined by something other than exponential energy consumption.
2. The assumption of exponential energy consumption is certainly wrong, because if we analyze per capita energy consumption throughout human history, it forms a series of logistic curves with a saturation point for each technological innovation. Therefore, a steady state or limited growth is more likely.
3. According to the principle of mediocrity, applied to the search for extraterrestrial civilizations by Sagan and Shklovskii in 1966 on the basis of John Richard Gott's calculations, civilizations more important than ours must be so rare that they do not have the possibility to dominate and be visible.
4. Finally, research and listening programs in Harvard University and Buenos Aires (Horowitz and Sagan in 1993 or Lemarchand et al. in 1997) have not provided any scientific proof of the existence of artificial sources, neither in the Milky Way nor in nearby galaxies (M33, M81, the Whirlpool Galaxy or Centaurus A), or even in the Virgo cluster.

For the British meteorologist Lewis Fry Richardson, author of a statistical study on mortality (published in Statistics of Deadly Quarrels, 1960), man's aggressiveness does not allow us to predict a life span that will allow humanity to reach more evolved stages. He estimates that man's violent impulses will destroy the social order over a period of 1,000 years. Moreover, mankind will probably be destroyed with weapons of mass destruction within a few centuries at the most.

Paleobiologist Olev Vinn has suggested that Kardashev’s idea may itself reflect a relatively crude phase of our technological development, rather than a universal principle. He points instead to the possibility of technological minimalism, in which highly advanced societies seek to maximize effectiveness while minimizing energy use. Rather than pursuing ever-increasing levels of power consumption, such civilizations might focus on optimization, efficiency, and extreme miniaturization. Mastery of quantum-scale engineering could allow them to perform complex functions using only negligible amounts of energy. A sufficiently advanced technological society might also choose to separate its technological systems from the surrounding environment. Viewed from interstellar distances, such a world could appear pristine—supporting a flourishing natural biosphere, with little or no visible trace of industry or artificial modification.

Transhumanists Paul Hughes and John Smart explain the absence of signals from a Type III civilization with two hypotheses: either it has self-destructed or it has not followed the trajectory described by Kardashev. The growth of energy consumption should lead to a climate crisis, which Yvan Dutil and Stéphane Dumas set at 1 W/m^{2} of the Earth or 127 TW for the entire planet. At a growth rate of 2% per year, an industrial civilization should stop growing quite early in its history (after a few centuries). In summary, the impossibility of sustainably securing energy resources may explain the absence of Type II and III civilizations.

For Zoltan Galántai, it is not possible to imagine a civilization project that spans centuries (like a Dyson sphere) or even millions of years, unless one imagines a thought and an ethic different from ours, within the reach of an ancestral civilization. He therefore proposes to classify civilizations according to their ability to carry out large-scale civilization projects over the long term.

Finally, for Freeman Dyson, communication and life can continue forever in an open Universe with a finite amount of energy; intelligence is therefore the only fundamental parameter for a civilization to survive in the very long term, and energy is then no longer what defines it, a thesis he develops in his article "Time Without End: Physics and Biology in an Open Universe".

== Energy development ==
=== Type I civilization methods ===
- Large-scale application of fusion power: In terms of mass–energy equivalence, Type I implies the conversion of about 2 kg of matter to energy per second. An equivalent energy release could theoretically be achieved by fusing about 280 kg of hydrogen into helium per second, a rate roughly equivalent to 8.9×10^{9} kg/year. One cubic kilometer of water contains about 10^{11} kg of hydrogen, and the Earth's oceans contain about 1.3×10^{9} km^{3} of water, meaning that humans on Earth could sustain this rate of consumption over geological time scales, in terms of available hydrogen.
- Antimatter in large quantities would provide a mechanism to produce power on a scale several orders of magnitude beyond the current level of technology. In antimatter-matter collisions, all of the rest mass of the particles is converted to radiant energy. Their energy density (energy released per mass) is about four orders of magnitude greater than that from using nuclear fission, and about two orders of magnitude greater than the best possible yield from fusion. The reaction of 1 kg of antimatter with 1 kg of matter would produce 1.8×10^{17} J (180 petajoules) of energy. Although antimatter is sometimes proposed as a source of energy, this does not seem feasible. Artificially producing antimatter – according to current understanding of the laws of physics – involves first converting energy into mass, which yields no net energy. Artificially created antimatter is usable only as an energy storage medium, not as an energy source, unless future technological developments (contrary to the conservation of the baryon number, such as a CP violation in favor of antimatter) allow the conversion of ordinary matter into anti-matter. Theoretically, humans may be able to cultivate and harvest a number of naturally occurring sources of antimatter in the future.
- Renewable energy by converting sunlight into electricity – either directly through solar cells and concentrating solar power, or indirectly through biofuels, wind, and hydroelectric power: There is no known way for a human civilization to harness the equivalent of the Earth's total absorbed solar energy without completely covering the surface with man-made structures, which is not feasible with current technology. However, if a civilization constructed very large space-based solar power satellites, Type I power levels might become achievable—these could convert sunlight to microwave power and beam it to collectors on Earth.

=== Type II civilization methods ===
A figure of a Dyson swarm surrounding a star

- Type II civilizations could use the same techniques as a Type I civilization, but applied to a large number of planets in a large number of star systems.
- A Dyson sphere or Dyson swarm and similar constructs are hypothetical megastructures originally described by Freeman Dyson as a system of orbiting solar power satellites designed to completely encircle a star and capture most or all of its energy output.
- Another means of generating usable energy would be to feed a stellar mass into a black hole, and collect the photons emitted by the accretion disk. A less exotic means would be to simply capture photons already escaping from the accretion disk, thereby reducing a black hole's angular momentum; this is known as the Penrose process. However, this may only be possible for a Type III civilization.
- Star lifting is a process by which an advanced civilization could remove a substantial portion of a star's matter in a controlled manner for other uses.
- Antimatter is likely to be produced as an industrial byproduct of a number of megascale engineering processes (such as the aforementioned star lifting), and could therefore be recycled.
- In multiple star systems with a sufficiently large number of stars: absorbing a small but significant fraction of the output of each individual star.
- Stellar engines can be used to move stars.

=== Type III civilization methods ===
- Type III civilizations might use the same techniques as a Type II civilization, but applied individually to all possible stars in one or more galaxies.
- They may also be able to tap into the energy released by the supermassive black holes believed to exist at the center of most galaxies.
- White holes could theoretically provide large amounts of energy by collecting the matter ejected outward.
- Capturing the energy of gamma-ray bursts is another theoretically possible power source for an advanced civilization.
- The emissions from quasars are comparable to those from small active galaxies and could be a massive power source if they could be collected.

== Civilization implications ==
There are many historical examples of human civilization undergoing large-scale transitions, such as the Industrial Revolution. The transitions between Kardashev scale levels could potentially represent similarly dramatic periods of social upheaval, as they involve exceeding the hard limits of the resources available within a civilization's existing territory. A common speculation is that the transition from Type 0 to Type I could carry a strong risk of self-destruction, since in some scenarios there would be no room for further expansion on the civilization's home planet, as in a Malthusian catastrophe.

For example, excessive energy consumption without adequate heat removal could plausibly render the planet of a Type I approaching civilization unsuitable for the biology of the dominant life forms and their food sources. Using Earth as an example, ocean temperatures above 95 °F (35 °C) would endanger marine life and make it difficult, if not impossible, for mammals to cool to temperatures suitable for their metabolism. Of course, these theoretical speculations may not become problems, possibly through the application of future engineering and technology. Also, by the time a civilization reaches Type I, it may have colonized other planets or established O'Neill-type colonies, so that waste heat could be distributed throughout the star system.

The limitations of biological life forms and the evolution of computer technology may lead to the transformation of the civilization through mind uploading and artificial general intelligence in general during the transition from Type I to Type II, leading to a digitized civilization.

== See also ==
- Megastructure
- Clarke's three laws
- Drake equation
- Dyson sphere
- Gerhard Lenski
- Great Filter
- HD 164595
- Orders of magnitude (energy)
- Orders of magnitude (power)
- Quiet and loud aliens
- Tabby's Star (KIC 8462852)
- Terraforming
- White's law
- World energy supply and consumption
