= CTA-102 =

Blazar-type quasar

CTA 102
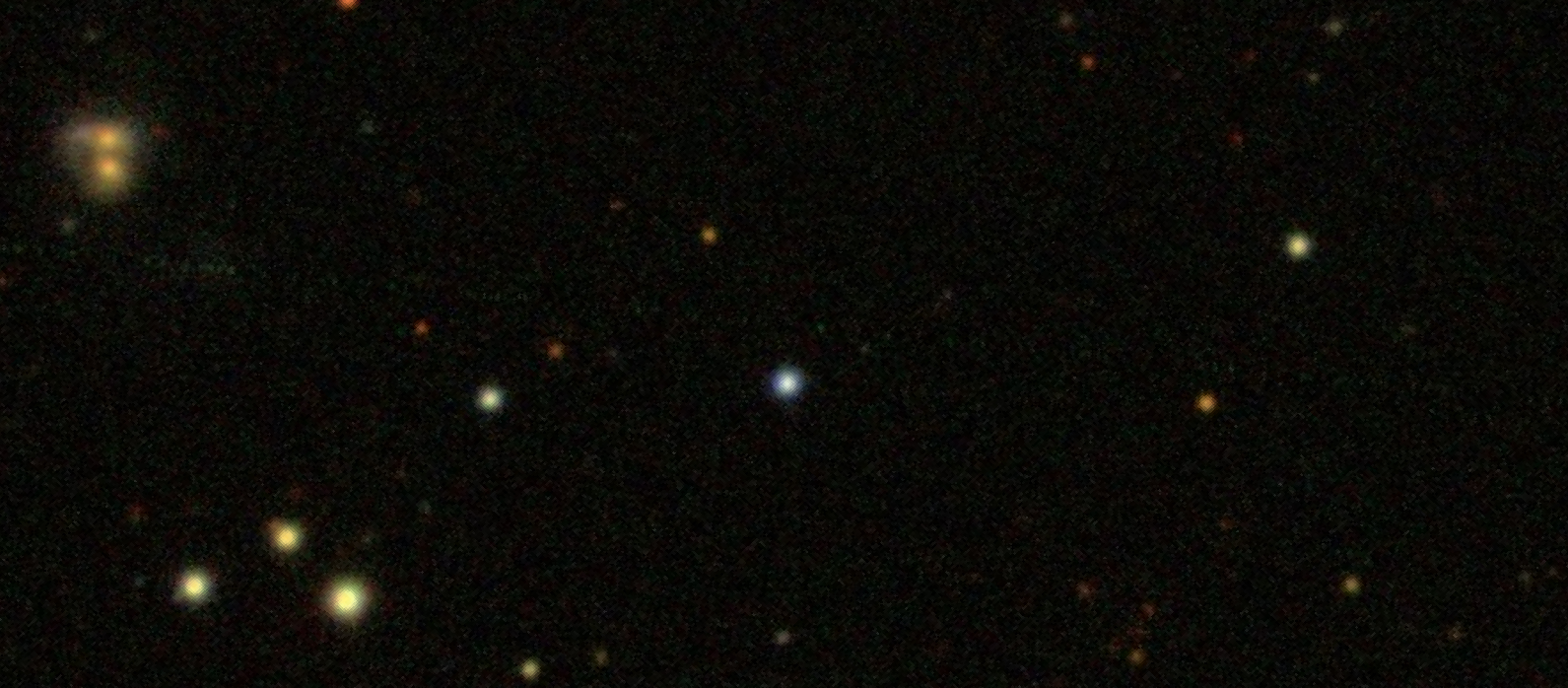
- SDSS image of CTA 102.

Observation data (Epoch J2000)
- Constellation: Pegasus
- Right ascension: 22^{h} 32^{m} 36.4^{s}
- Declination: +11° 43′ 51s″
- Redshift: 1.037
- Distance: 8 billion light years

Other designations
- CTA-102, Q2230+11, QSR B2230+114, QSO J2232+1143, 4C +11.69, PGC 2819036

CTA 102, also known by its B1950 coordinates as 2230+114 (QSR B2230+114) and its J2000 coordinates as J2232+1143 (QSO J2232+1143), is a blazar-type quasar discovered in the early 1960s by a radio survey carried out by the California Institute of Technology. It has been observed by a large range of instruments since its discovery, including WMAP, EGRET, GALEX, VSOP and Parkes, and has been regularly imaged by the Very Long Baseline Array since 1995. It has also been detected in gamma rays, and a gamma-ray flare has been detected from it.

In 1963 Nikolai Kardashev proposed that the then-unidentified radio source could be evidence of a Type II or III extraterrestrial civilization on the Kardashev scale. Follow-up observations were announced in 1965 by Gennady Sholomitskii, who found that the object's radio emission was varying; a public announcement of these results on April 12, 1965, caused a worldwide sensation. The idea that the emission was caused by a civilization was rejected when the radio source was later identified as one of the many varieties of a quasar.

The American folk rock band The Byrds whimsically reflected the original view that CTA-102 was a sign of extraterrestrial intelligence in their song "C.T.A.-102" from their 1967 album Younger Than Yesterday.

In late 2016 CTA 102, usually glowing around magnitude +17, had a bright outburst in visible light to magnitude +11 (~250 times brighter than usual). This likely was the most luminous blazar state ever observed, with an absolute magnitude in excess of -32.

A new outburst began in December 2017, with increased gamma-ray and optical activity. As of 22 December 2017, it has reached magnitude +14.

CTA 102 displays a radio structure mainly made of a radio core and two other components. There is also a double knot feature. Additionally, it also has two radio lobes described having flux densities of 170 and 75 mJy, with a jet found as curved according to high resolution imaging by Very Long Baseline interferometry at 15 GHz. This jet contains jet components moving with apparent velocities of 15.4 ± 0.9c.

The quasar is also classified to be highly polarized with a flat radio spectrum, and such belongs to a classification of optically violent variable quasars.

== See also ==
- PSR B1919+21, the first pulsar discovered, mistaken for an alien radio signal
- HD 164595
