= Leslie White =

American anthropologist (1900–1975)

- Born: January 19, 1900; Salida, Colorado
- Died: March 31, 1975 (aged 75); Lone Pine, California
- Occupation: Anthropologist
- Known for: Neoevolutionism; White's law

Leslie Alvin White (January 19, 1900, Salida, Colorado – March 31, 1975, Lone Pine, California) was an American anthropologist known for his advocacy of the theories on cultural evolution, sociocultural evolution, and especially neoevolutionism, and for his role in creating the department of anthropology at the University of Michigan Ann Arbor. White was president of the American Anthropological Association (1964).

== Anthropology ==
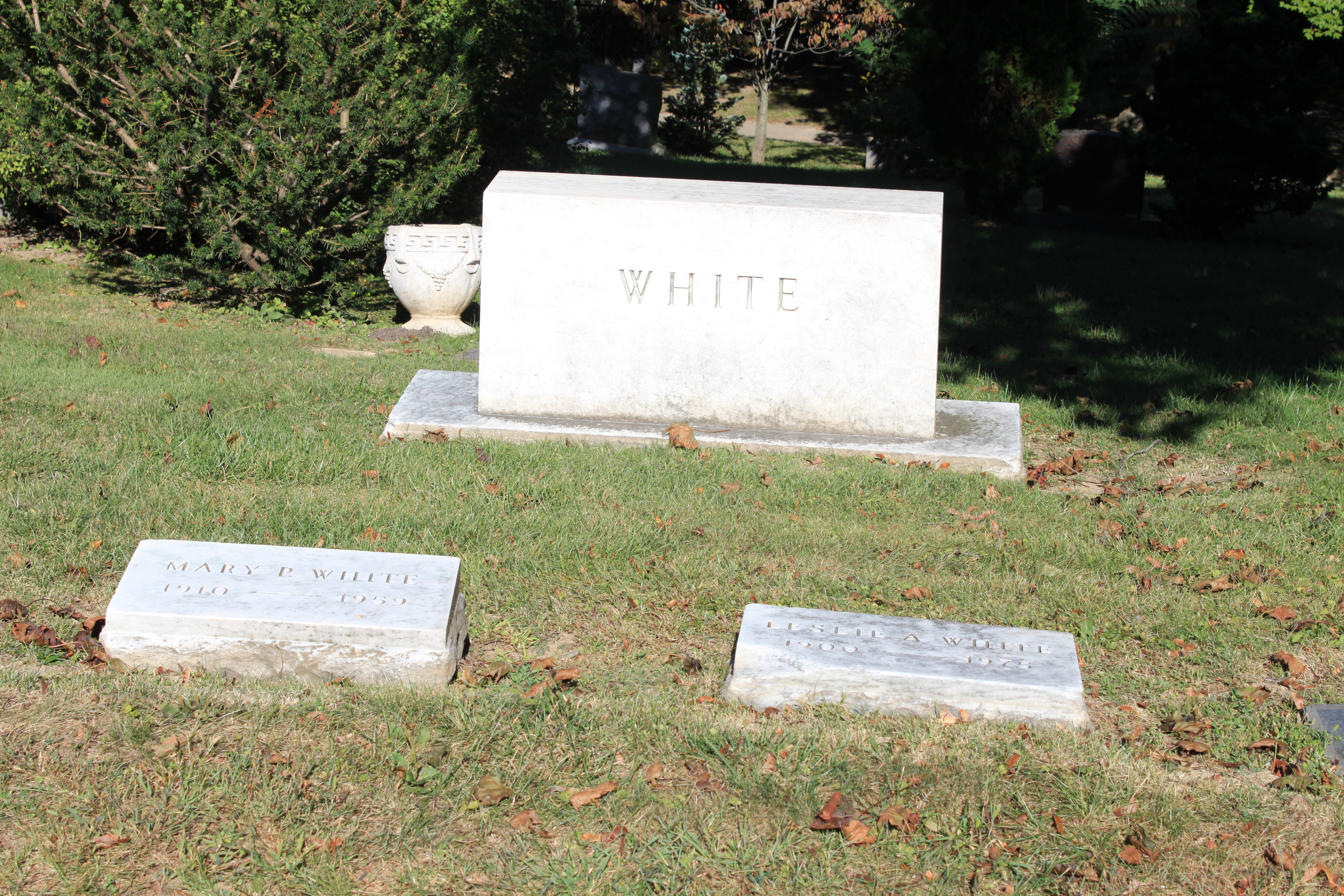
White grave, Forest Hill Cemetery

Teaching at University of Buffalo marked a turning point in White's thinking. White developed an interest in Marxism in 1929. He visited the Soviet Union and on his return joined the Socialist Labor Party, writing articles under the pseudonym "John Steel" for their newspaper.

Over time, White's views became framed in opposition to that of Boasians, with whom he was institutionally at odds. This could take on personal overtones: White referred to Boas's prose style as "corny" in the American Journal of Sociology. Robert Lowie, a proponent of Boas's work, referred to White's work as "a farrago of immature metaphysical notions", shaped by "the obsessive power of fanaticism [which] unconsciously warps one's vision."

White spoke of culture as a general human phenomenon and claimed not to speak of 'cultures' in the plural. His theory, published in 1959 in The Evolution of Culture: The Development of Civilization to the Fall of Rome, rekindled the interest in social evolutionism and is counted prominently among the neoevolutionists. He believed that culture–meaning the total of all human cultural activity on the planet–was evolving. White differentiated three components of culture: technological, sociological, and ideological. He argued that it was the technological component which plays a primary role or is the primary determining factor responsible for the cultural evolution. His materialist approach is evident in the following quote: "man as an animal species, and consequently culture as a whole, is dependent upon the material, mechanical means of adjustment to the natural environment." This technological component can be described as material, mechanical, physical, and chemical instruments, as well as the way people use these techniques. White's argument on the importance of technology goes as follows:

1. Technology is an attempt to solve the problems of survival.
2. This attempt ultimately means capturing enough energy and diverting it for human needs.
3. Societies that capture more energy and use it more efficiently have an advantage over other societies.
4. Therefore, these different societies are more advanced in an evolutionary sense.

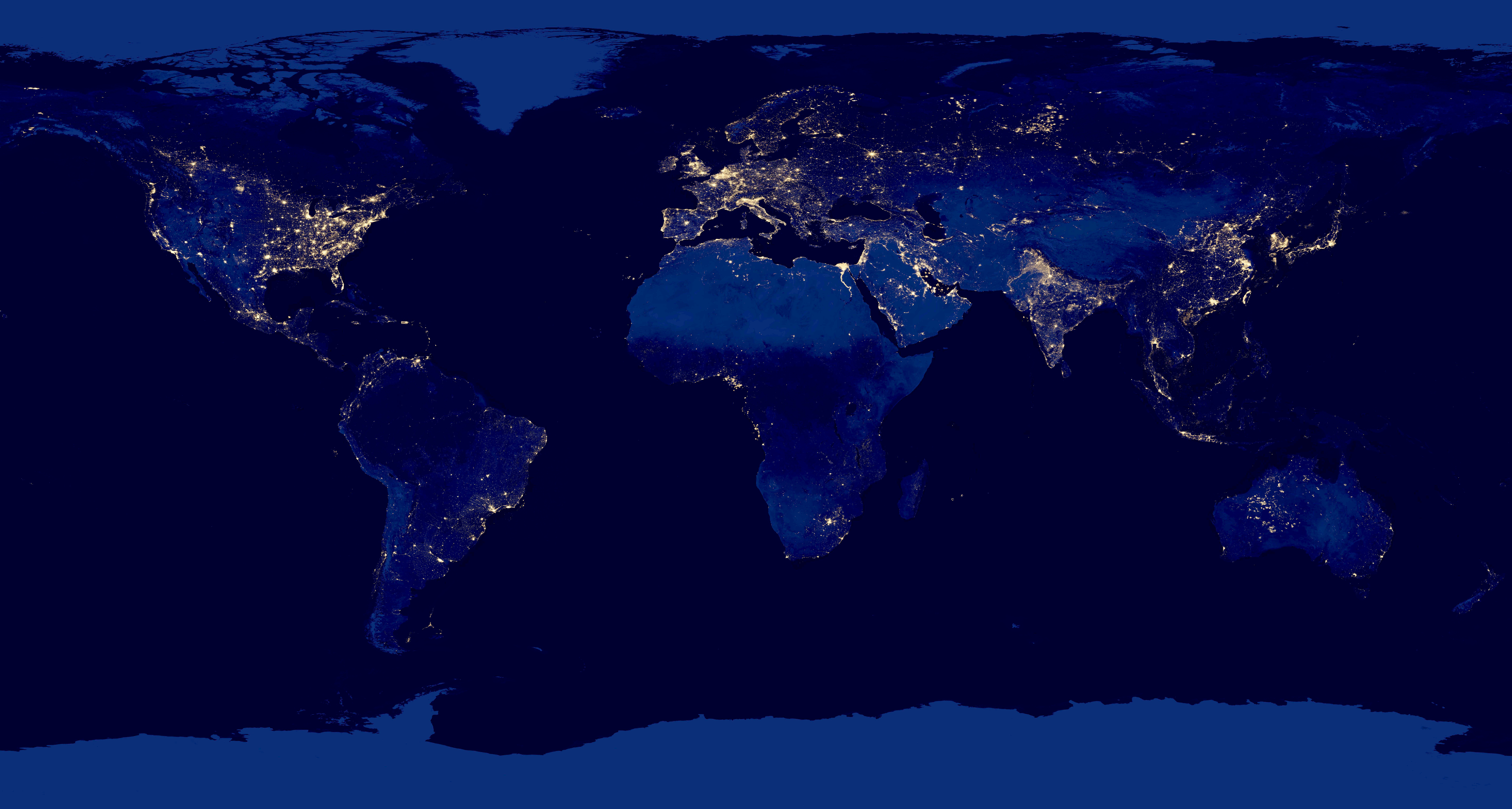
Composite image of the Earth at night in 2012, created by NASA and NOAA. The brightest areas of the Earth are the most urbanized, but not necessarily the most populous. Even more than 100 years after the invention of the electric light, some regions remain thinly populated and unlit.

== See also ==
- List of important publications in anthropology
