= Orders of magnitude (power) =

Comparison of a wide range of physical powers

This page lists examples of the power in watts produced by various sources of energy. They are grouped by orders of magnitude from small to large.

== Below 1 W ==
Factor (watts)	SI prefix	Value (watts)	Value (decibel-milliwatts)	Item
10^{−50}		5.4 × 10^{−50}	−463 dBm	astro: Hawking radiation power of the ultramassive black hole TON 618.
10^{−27}	ronto- (rW)	1.64×10^{−27}	−238 dBm	phys: approximate power of gravitational radiation emitted by a 1000 kg satellite in geosynchronous orbit around the Earth.
10^{−24}	yocto- (yW)	1×10^{−24}	−210 dBm	
10^{−21}	zepto- (zW)	1×10^{−21}	−180 dBm	biomed: approximate lowest recorded power consumption of a deep-subsurface marine microbe
10^{−20}		1×10^{−20}	−170 dBm	tech: approximate power of Galileo space probe's radio signal (when at Jupiter) as received on earth by a 70-meter DSN antenna.
10^{−18}	atto- (aW)	1×10^{−18}	−150 dBm	phys: approximate power scale at which operation of nanoelectromechanical systems are overwhelmed by thermal fluctuations.
10^{−16}		1×10^{−16}	−130 dBm	tech: the GPS signal strength measured at the surface of the Earth.
10^{−16}		2×10^{−16}	−127 dBm	biomed: approximate theoretical minimum luminosity detectable by the human eye under perfect conditions
10^{−15}	femto- (fW)	2.5×10^{−15}	−116 dBm	tech: minimum discernible signal at the antenna terminal of a good FM radio receiver
10^{−14}		1×10^{−14}	−110 dBm	tech: approximate lower limit of power reception on digital spread-spectrum cell phones
10^{−12}	pico- (pW)	1×10^{−12}	−90 dBm	biomed: average power consumption of a human cell
10^{−11}		1.84×10^{−11}	−77 dBm	phys: power lost in the form of synchrotron radiation by a proton revolving in the Large Hadron Collider at 7000 GeV
10^{−11}		2.9×10^{−11}	−72 dBm	astro: power per square meter received from Proxima Centauri, the closest star known
10^{−10}		1×10^{−10}	−68 dBm	astro: estimated total Hawking radiation power of all black holes in the observable universe.
10^{−10}		1.5×10^{−10}	−68 dBm	biomed: power entering a human eye from a 100-watt lamp 1 km away
10^{−9}	nano- (nW)	2–15×10^{−9}	−57 dBm to −48 dBm	tech: power consumption of 8-bit PIC microcontroller chips when in "sleep" mode
10^{−6}	micro- (μW)	1×10^{−6}	−30 dBm	tech: approximate consumption of a quartz or mechanical wristwatch
10^{−6}	micro- (μW)	3×10^{−6}	−25 dBm	astro: cosmic microwave background radiation per square meter
10^{−5}		5×10^{−5}	−13 dBm	biomed: sound power incident on a human eardrum at the threshold intensity for pain (500 mW/m^{2}).
10^{−3}	milli- (mW)	1.55×10^{−3}	−4.7 dBm	astro: power per square meter received from the Sun by Sedna at its aphelion
10^{−3}	milli- (mW)	5×10^{−3}	7 dBm	tech: laser in a CD-ROM drive
10^{−3}	milli- (mW)	5–10×10^{−3}	7 dBm to 10 dBm	tech: laser in a DVD player
10^{−2}	centi- (cW)	7×10^{−2}	18 dBm	tech: antenna power in a typical consumer wireless router
10^{−1}	deci- (dW)	1.2×10^{−1}	21 dBm	astro: total proton decay power of Earth, assuming the half life of protons to take on the value 10^{35} years.
10^{−1}	deci- (dW)	5×10^{−1}	27 dBm	tech: maximum allowed carrier output power of an FRS radio

== 1 to 10^{2} W ==
Factor (watts)	SI prefix	Value (watts)	Item
10^{0}	W	1	tech: cellphone camera light
10^{0}	W	1.508	astro: power per square metre received from the Sun at Neptune's aphelion
10^{0}	W	2	tech: maximum allowed carrier power output of a MURS radio
10^{0}	W	4	tech: the power consumption of an incandescent night light
10^{0}	W	4	tech: maximum allowed carrier power output of a 10-meter CB radio
10^{0}	W	7	tech: the power consumption of a typical Light-emitting diode (LED) light bulb
10^{0}	W	8	tech: human-powered equipment using a hand crank.
10^{1}	deca- (daW)	1.4 × 10^{1}	tech: the power consumption of a typical household compact fluorescent light bulb
10^{1}	deca- (daW)	2–4 × 10^{1}	biomed: approximate power consumption of the human brain
10^{1}	deca- (daW)	3–4 × 10^{1}	tech: the power consumption of a typical household fluorescent tube light
10^{1}	deca- (daW)	6 × 10^{1}	tech: the power consumption of a typical household incandescent light bulb
10^{2}	hecto- (hW)	1 × 10^{2}	biomed: approximate basal metabolic rate of an adult human body
10^{2}	hecto- (hW)	1.2 × 10^{2}	tech: electric power output of 1 m^{2} solar panel in full sunlight (approx. 12% efficiency), at sea level
10^{2}	hecto- (hW)	1.3 × 10^{2}	tech: peak power consumption of a Pentium 4 CPU
10^{2}	hecto- (hW)	2 × 10^{2}	tech: stationary bicycle average power output
10^{2}	hecto- (hW)	2.76 × 10^{2}	astro: fusion power output of 1 cubic meter of volume of the Sun's core.
10^{2}	hecto- (hW)	2.9 × 10^{2}	units: approximately 1000 BTU/hour
10^{2}	hecto- (hW)	3 × 10^{2}	tech: PC GPU Nvidia GeForce RTX 4080 peak power consumption
10^{2}	hecto- (hW)	4 × 10^{2}	tech: legal limit of power output of an amateur radio station in the United Kingdom
10^{2}	hecto- (hW)	5 × 10^{2}	biomed: power output (useful work plus heat) of a person working hard physically
10^{2}	hecto- (hW)	7.457 × 10^{2}	units: 1 horsepower
10^{2}	hecto- (hW)	7.5 × 10^{2}	astro: approximately the amount of sunlight falling on a square metre of the Earth's surface at noon on a clear day in March for northern temperate latitudes
10^{2}	hecto- (hW)	9.09 × 10^{2}	biomed: peak output power of a healthy human (non-athlete) during a 30-second cycle sprint at 30.1 degree Celsius.

== 10^{3} to 10^{8} W ==
10^{3}	kilo- (kW)	1–3 × 10^{3} W	tech: heat output of a domestic electric kettle
10^{3}	kilo- (kW)	1.1 × 10^{3} W	tech: power of a microwave oven
10^{3}	kilo- (kW)	1.366 × 10^{3} W	astro: power per square meter received from the Sun at the Earth's orbit
10^{3}	kilo- (kW)	1.5 × 10^{3} W	tech: legal limit of power output of an amateur radio station in the United States
10^{3}	kilo- (kW)	up to 2 × 10^{3} W	biomed: approximate short-time power output of sprinting professional cyclists and weightlifters doing snatch lifts
10^{3}	kilo- (kW)	2.4 × 10^{3} W	geo: average power consumption per person worldwide in 2008 (21,283 kWh/year)
10^{3}	kilo- (kW)	3.3–6.6 × 10^{3} W	eco: average photosynthetic power output per square kilometer of ocean
10^{3}	kilo- (kW)	3.6 × 10^{3} W	tech: synchrotron radiation power lost per ring in the Large Hadron Collider at 7000 GeV
10^{4}		1–5 × 10^{4} W	tech: nominal power of clear channel AM
10^{4}		1.00 × 10^{4} W	eco: average power consumption per person in the United States in 2008 (87,216 kWh/year)
10^{4}		1.4 × 10^{4} W	tech: average power consumption of an electric car on EPA's Highway test schedule
10^{4}		1.45 × 10^{4} W	astro: power per square metre received from the Sun at Mercury's orbit at perihelion
10^{4}		1.6–3.2 × 10^{4} W	eco: average photosynthetic power output per square kilometer of land
10^{4}		3 × 10^{4} W	tech: power generated by the four motors of GEN H-4 one-man helicopter
10^{4}		4–20 × 10^{4} W	tech: approximate range of peak power output of typical automobiles (50-250 hp)
10^{4}		5–10 × 10^{4} W	tech: highest allowed ERP for an FM band radio station in the United States
10^{5}		1.67 × 10^{5} W	tech: power consumption of UNIVAC 1 computer
10^{5}		2.5–8 × 10^{5} W	tech: approximate range of power output of 'supercars' (300 to 1000 hp)
10^{5}		4.5 × 10^{5} W	tech: approximate maximum power output of a large 18-wheeler truck engine (600 hp)
10^{6}	mega- (MW)	1.03 × 10^{6} W	tech: approximate maximum power output of BMW M12/13/1 Formula One engine in qualifying trim (1400 hp)
10^{6}	mega- (MW)	1.3 × 10^{6} W	tech: power output of P-51 Mustang fighter aircraft
10^{6}	mega- (MW)	1.9 × 10^{6} W	astro: power per square meter potentially received by Earth at the peak of the Sun's red giant phase
10^{6}	mega- (MW)	2.0 × 10^{6} W	tech: peak power output of GE's standard wind turbine
10^{6}	mega- (MW)	2.4 × 10^{6} W	tech: peak power output of a Princess Coronation class steam locomotive (approx 3.3K EDHP on test) (1937)
10^{6}	mega- (MW)	2.5 × 10^{6} W	biomed: peak power output of a blue whale
10^{6}	mega- (MW)	3 × 10^{6} W	tech: mechanical power output of a diesel locomotive
10^{6}	mega- (MW)	4.4 × 10^{6} W	tech: total mechanical power output of Titanic's coal-fueled steam engines
10^{6}	mega- (MW)	7 × 10^{6} W	tech: mechanical power output of a Top Fuel dragster
10^{6}	mega- (MW)	8 × 10^{6} W	tech: peak power output of the MHI Vestas V164, the world's largest offshore wind turbine
10^{7}		1 × 10^{7} W	tech: highest ERP allowed for an UHF television station
10^{7}		1.03 × 10^{7} W	geo: electrical power output of Togo
10^{7}		1.22 × 10^{7} W	tech: approx power available to a Eurostar 20-carriage train
10^{7}		1.5 × 10^{7} W	tech: electrical power consumption of Sunway TaihuLight, the most powerful supercomputer in China
10^{7}		1.6 × 10^{7} W	tech: rate at which a typical gasoline pump transfers chemical energy to a vehicle
10^{7}		2.6 × 10^{7} W	tech: peak power output of the reactor of a Los Angeles-class nuclear submarine
10^{7}		7.5 × 10^{7} W	tech: maximum power output of one GE90 jet engine as installed on the Boeing 777
10^{8}			
10^{8}		1.4 × 10^{8} W	tech: average power consumption of a Boeing 747 passenger aircraft
10^{8}		1.9 × 10^{8} W	tech: peak power output of a Nimitz-class aircraft carrier
10^{8}		5 × 10^{8} W	tech: typical power output of a fossil fuel power station
10^{8}		9 × 10^{8} W	tech: electric power output of a CANDU nuclear reactor
10^{8}		9.59 × 10^{8} W	geo: average electrical power consumption of Zimbabwe in 1998
10^{8}		9.86 × 10^{8} W	astro: approximate solar power received by the dwarf planet Sedna at its aphelion (937 AU)

The productive capacity of electrical generators operated by utility companies is often measured in MW. Few things can sustain the transfer or consumption of energy on this scale; some of these events or entities include: lightning strikes, naval craft (such as aircraft carriers and submarines), engineering hardware, and some scientific research equipment (such as supercolliders and large lasers).

For reference, about 10,000 100-watt lightbulbs or 5,000 computer systems would be needed to draw 1 MW. Also, 1 MW is approximately 1360 horsepower. Modern high-power diesel-electric locomotives typically have a peak power of 3–5 MW, while a typical modern nuclear power plant produces on the order of 500–2000 MW peak output.

== 10^{9} to 10^{14} W ==
10^{9}	giga- (GW)	1.3 × 10^{9}	tech: electric power output of Manitoba Hydro Limestone hydroelectric generating station
10^{9}	giga- (GW)	2.074 × 10^{9}	tech: peak power generation of Hoover Dam
10^{9}	giga- (GW)	2.1 × 10^{9}	tech: peak power generation of Aswan Dam
10^{9}	giga- (GW)	3.4 × 10^{9}	tech: estimated power consumption of the Bitcoin network in 2017
10^{9}	giga- (GW)	4.116 × 10^{9}	tech: installed capacity of Kendal Power Station, the world's largest coal-fired power plant.
10^{9}	giga- (GW)	5.824 × 10^{9}	tech: installed capacity of the Taichung Power Plant, the largest coal-fired power plant in Taiwan and fourth largest of its kind. It was the single most polluting power plant on Earth in 2009.
10^{9}	giga- (GW)	7.965 × 10^{9}	tech: installed capacity of the largest nuclear power plant, the Kashiwazaki-Kariwa Nuclear Power Plant, before it was shut down in the wake of the Fukushima nuclear disaster.
10^{10}		1.17 × 10^{10}	tech: power produced by the Space Shuttle in liftoff configuration (9.875 GW from the SRBs; 1.9875 GW from the SSMEs.)
10^{10}		1.26 × 10^{10}	tech: electrical power generation of the Itaipu Dam
10^{10}		1.27 × 10^{10}	geo: average electrical power consumption of Norway in 1998
10^{10}		2.25 × 10^{10}	tech: peak electrical power generation of the Three Gorges Dam, the power plant with the world's largest generating capacity of any type.
10^{10}		2.24 × 10^{10}	tech: peak power of all German solar panels (at noon on a cloudless day), researched by the Fraunhofer ISE research institute in 2014
10^{10}		5.027 × 10^{10}	tech: peak electrical power consumption of California Independent System Operator users between 1998 and 2018, recorded at 14:44 Pacific Time, July 24, 2006.
10^{10}		5.22 × 10^{10}	tech: China total nuclear power capacity as of 2022.
10^{10}		5.5 × 10^{10}	tech: peak daily electrical power consumption of Great Britain in November 2008.
10^{10}		7.31 × 10^{10}	tech: total installed power capacity of Turkey on December 31, 2015.
10^{10}		9.55 × 10^{10}	tech: United States total nuclear power capacity as of 2022.
10^{11}		1.016 × 10^{11}	tech: peak electrical power consumption of France (February 8, 2012 at 7:00 pm)
10^{11}		1.12 × 10^{11}	tech: United States total installed solar capacity as of 2022.
10^{11}		1.41 × 10^{11}	tech: United States total wind turbine capacity in 2022.
10^{11}		1.66 × 10^{11}	tech: average power consumption of the first stage of the Saturn V rocket.
10^{11}		3.66 × 10^{11}	tech: China total wind turbine capacity in 2022.
10^{11}		3.92 × 10^{11}	tech: China total installed solar capacity as of 2022.
10^{11}		7 × 10^{11}	biomed: humankind basal metabolic rate as of 2013 (7 billion people).
10^{11}		8.99 × 10^{11}	tech: worldwide wind turbine capacity at end of 2022.
10^{12}	tera- (TW)	1.062 × 10^{12}	tech: worldwide installed solar capacity at end of 2022.
10^{12}	tera- (TW)	2 × 10^{12}	astro: approximate power generated between the surfaces of Jupiter and its moon Io due to Jupiter's tremendous magnetic field.
10^{12}	tera- (TW)	3.34 × 10^{12}	geo: average total (gas, electricity, etc.) power consumption of the US in 2005
10^{13}		2.04 × 10^{13}	tech: average rate of power consumption of humanity over 2022.
10^{13}		4.7 × 10^{13}	geo: average total heat flow at Earth's surface which originates from its interior. Main sources are roughly equal amounts of radioactive decay and residual heat from Earth's formation.
10^{13}		8.8 × 10^{13}	astro: luminosity per square meter of the hottest normal star known, WR 102
10^{13}		5–20 × 10^{13}	weather: rate of heat energy release by a hurricane
10^{14}		1.4 × 10^{14}	eco: global net primary production (= biomass production) via photosynthesis
10^{14}		2.9 × 10^{14}	tech: the power the Z machine reaches in 1 billionth of a second when it is fired
10^{14}		3 × 10^{14}	weather: Hurricane Katrina's rate of release of latent heat energy into the air.
10^{14}		3 × 10^{14}	tech: power reached by the extremely high-power Hercules laser from the University of Michigan.
10^{14}		4.6 × 10^{14}	geo: estimated rate of net global heating, evaluated as Earth's energy imbalance, from 2005 to 2019. The rate of ocean heat uptake approximately doubled over this period.

== 10^{15} to 10^{29} W ==
10^{15}	peta- (PW)	~2 × 1.00 × 10^{15} W	tech: Omega EP laser power at the Laboratory for Laser Energetics. There are two separate beams that are combined.
10^{15}	peta- (PW)	1.4 × 10^{15} W	geo: estimated heat flux transported by the Gulf Stream.
10^{15}	peta- (PW)	5 × 10^{15} W	geo: estimated net heat flux transported from Earth's equator and towards each pole. Value is a latitudinal maximum arising near 40° in each hemisphere.
10^{15}	peta- (PW)	7 × 10^{15} W	tech: the world's most powerful laser in operation (claimed on February 7, 2019, by Extreme Light Infrastructure – Nuclear Physics (ELI-NP) at Magurele, Romania)
10^{16}		1.03 × 10^{16} W	tech: world's most powerful laser pulses (claimed on October 24, 2017, by SULF of Shanghai Institute of Optics and Fine Mechanics).
10^{16}		1–10 × 10^{16} W	tech: estimated total power output of a Type-I civilization on the Kardashev scale.
10^{17}		1.73 × 10^{17} W	astro: total power received by Earth from the Sun
10^{17}		2 × 10^{17} W	tech: planned peak power of Extreme Light Infrastructure laser
10^{17}		4.6 × 10^{17} W	astro: total internal heat flux of Jupiter
10^{18}	exa- (EW)		tech: output of the proposed "Nexawatt" Laser, an exawatt laser concept described at the 2015 SPIE Optics + Optoelectronics Conference, Prague.
10^{21}	zetta- (ZW)		
10^{22}		5.31 × 10^{22} W	astro: approximate luminosity of 2MASS J0523−1403, the least luminous star known.
10^{23}		4.08 × 10^{23} W	astro: approximate luminosity of Wolf 359
10^{24}	yotta- (YW)	5.3 × 10^{24} W	tech: estimated peak power of the Tsar Bomba hydrogen bomb detonation
10^{24}	yotta- (YW)	9.8 × 10^{24} W	astro: approximate luminosity of Sirius B, Sirius's white dwarf companion.
10^{26}		1 × 10^{26} W	tech: power generating capacity of a Type-II civilization on the Kardashev scale.
10^{26}		1.87 × 10^{26} W	astro: approximate luminosity of Tau Ceti, the nearest solitary G-type star.
10^{26}		3.828 × 10^{26} W	astro: luminosity of the Sun, our home star
10^{26}		7.67 × 10^{26} W	astro: approximate luminosity of Alpha Centauri, the closest (triple) star system.
10^{27}	ronna- (RW)	9.77 × 10^{27} W	astro: approximate luminosity of Sirius, the visibly brightest star as viewed from Earth.
10^{28}	ronna- (RW)	6.51 × 10^{28} W	astro: approximate luminosity of Arcturus, a solar-mass red giant

== Over 10^{29} W ==
10^{30}	quetta- (QW)	1.99 × 10^{30} W	astro: peak luminosity of the Sun in its thermally-pulsing, late AGB phase (≈5200x present)
10^{30}	quetta- (QW)	4.1 × 10^{30} W	astro: approximate luminosity of Canopus
10^{31}		2.53 × 10^{31} W	astro: approximate luminosity of the Beta Centauri triple star system
10^{31}		3.3 × 10^{31} W	astro: approximate luminosity of Betelgeuse, a highly evolved red supergiant
10^{32}		1.23 × 10^{32} W	astro: approximate luminosity of Deneb
10^{33}		1.26 × 10^{33} W	astro: approximate luminosity of the Pistol Star, an LBV which emits in 10 seconds the Sun's annual energy output
10^{33}		1.79 × 10^{33} W	astro: approximate luminosity of R136a1, a massive Wolf-Rayet star and the most luminous single star known
10^{33}		2.1 × 10^{33} W	astro: approximate luminosity of the Eta Carinae system, a highly elliptical binary of two supergiant blue stars orbiting each other
10^{34}		4 × 10^{34} W	tech: approximate power used by a type III civilization in the Kardashev scale.
10^{36}		5.7 × 10^{36} W	astro: approximate luminosity of the Milky Way galaxy
10^{37}		2 × 10^{37} W	astro: approximate luminosity of the Local Group, the volume enclosed by our gravitational cosmic horizon
10^{37}		4 × 10^{37} W	astro: approximate internal luminosity of the Sun for a few seconds as it undergoes a helium flash.
10^{37}		4.3 × 10^{37 W}	astro: Peak luminosity of the most energetic supernova ever known, SN 2016aps
10^{38}		~2.2 × 10^{38} W	astro: approximate luminosity of the extremely luminous supernova ASASSN-15lh
10^{39}		1 × 10^{39} W	astro: average luminosity of a quasar
10^{39}		1.57 × 10^{39} W	astro: approximate luminosity of 3C273, the brightest quasar seen from Earth
10^{40}		5 × 10^{40} W	astro: approximate peak luminosity of the energetic fast blue optical transient CSS161010
10^{41}		1 × 10^{41} W	astro: approximate luminosity of the most luminous quasars in our universe, e.g., APM 08279+5255 and HS 1946+7658.
10^{42}		1.7 × 10^{42} W	astro: approximate luminosity of the Laniakea Supercluster
10^{42}		~3.2 × 10^{42} W	astro: approximate luminosity of an average gamma-ray burst
10^{43}		2.2 × 10^{43} W	astro: average stellar luminosity in one cubic gigalight-year of space
10^{45}			
10^{46}		>1.2 × 10^{46} W	astro: record for maximum beaming-corrected intrinsic luminosity (Lγ) ever achieved by a gamma-ray burst, that is GRB 110918A, in 64 ms (0.384–0.448 s)
10^{47}		~2.1× 10^{47} W	astro: peak of luminosity of the GRB 221009A, the most energetic GRB of all times, nicknamed the BOAT (brightest of all times), in 1.024 seconds
10^{47}		~4.7 × 10^{47} W	astro: Isotropic luminosity (Liso) of the same ultraluminous GRB 110918A
10^{47}		7.519 × 10^{47} W	phys: Hawking radiation luminosity of a Planck mass black hole
10^{48}		9.5 × 10^{48} W	astro: luminosity of the entire Observable universe ≈ 24.6 billion trillion solar luminosity.
10^{49}		3.6 × 10^{49} W	astro: peak gravitational wave radiative power of GW150914, the merger event of two distant stellar-mass black holes. It is attributed to the first observation of gravitational waves.
10^{52}		3.63 × 10^{52} W	phys: the unit of power as expressed under the Planck units, (Note: $\frac{c^5}{G}$) at which the definition of power under modern conceptualizations of physics breaks down. Equivalent to one Planck mass-energy per Planck time.

== See also ==
- Orders of magnitude (energy)
- Orders of magnitude (voltage)
- World energy resources and consumption
- International System of Units (SI)
- SI prefix
