= Nikolai Kardashev =

Soviet and Russian astrophysicist (1932–2019)

- Николай Кардашёв
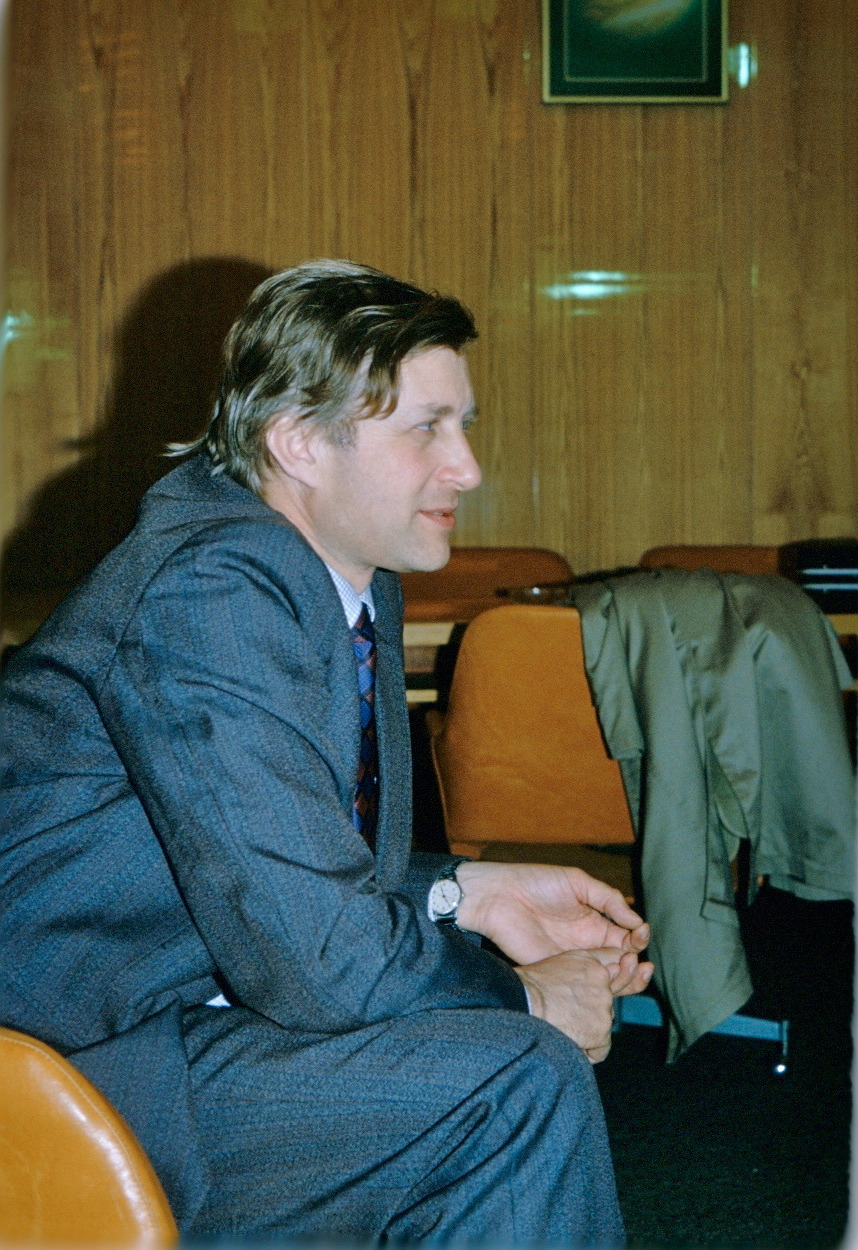
- Kardashev in 1980
- Born: 25 April 1932; Moscow, Soviet Union
- Died: 3 August 2019 (aged 87); Moscow, Russia
- Known for: Kardashev scale
- Scientific career
- Fields: Astrophysics
- Doctoral advisor: Iosif Shklovsky

Nikolai Semyonovich Kardashev (Note: In this name that follows East Slavic naming customs, the patronymic is Semyonovich and the family name is Kardashev.) (Note: Russian: Никола́й Семёнович Кардашёв, romanized: Nikolay Semyonovich Kardashov, IPA: [nʲɪkɐˈlaj sʲɪˈmʲɵnəvʲɪtɕ kərdɐˈʂof].) (25 April 1932 – 3 August 2019) was a Soviet and Russian astrophysicist best known for the Kardashev scale, which measures a civilization's status in technological evolution based on the amount of energy it is capable of harnessing and using. He was also the deputy director of the Astro Space Center of the Lebedev Physical Institute of the Russian Academy of Sciences.

== Early life ==
He was born in Moscow to a family of professional revolutionaries involved with the Bolshevik Party. His parents were Semyon Karlovich Brike and Nina Nikolaevna Kardasheva; his father was an important member of the party, and his mother joined as well before the October Revolution in 1917. Both of his parents were arrested during the Great Purge of 1937 and 1938. His father was ultimately shot and his mother was assigned to labor camps and would not be released for many years. Due to his parents’ absence, he was sent to an orphanage from which he was then taken by his mother's sister after a great deal of effort. His aunt then died during World War II when he was 16 years old and he then had to live on his own in a large communal flat. His mother was released in 1956, by which time Nikolai had completed university.

== Education ==
He attended Moscow State University in the astronomy division of the Faculty of Mechanics and Mathematics. He concentrated his studies based on his interest in radio astronomy, a topic that was new and developing at the time. After graduating in 1955, he worked at the Sternberg Astronomical Institute and received his doctorate in physical and mathematical sciences in 1962.

== Career ==
He joined the Space Research Institute (IKI) of the USSR Academy of Sciences in 1967. He became deputy director of IKI in 1977. During the dissolution of the USSR, Nikolai became the director of the Astro Space Center of the Lebedev Physical Institute. In 1978, Nikolai started a space satellite project known as RadioAstron. The program endured for more than 30 years and a space satellite named Spektr-R was finally launched in 2011. The mission RadioAstron has become important for modern observational astrophysics.

In 1964, at a conference in Soviet Armenia, he presented a paper titled "Передача информации внеземными цивилизациями" ("Transmission of Information by Extraterrestrial Civilizations"). The paper proposed what would become known as the Kardashev scale, the idea of measuring a civilization's technological advancement based on the amount of energy it is able to use, with a civilization that can use all the energy of a planet defined as Type I (the other Types, II and III, were defined as civilizations that can use all the energy of a star and a galaxy, respectively). He also proposed Very Long Baseline Interferometry (VLBI), which replaced conventional radio transmission lines with magnetic tape recordings; it was demonstrated in 1967.

He may have predicted the existence of pulsars before they were actually discovered, in his paper ‘Transmission of Information by Extraterrestrial Civilizations'.

== Organizations ==
He was an active participant of the International Astronomical Union, for which he was: Vice-president of Executive Committee (1997–2003), vice-president of Commission 51 Bio-Astronomy (1982–1991), Organizing Committee Member of Commission 40 Radio Astronomy (1967–1985), Member of Division B Facilities, Technologies and Data Science (2019), Member of Division F Planetary Systems and Astrobiology (2019), Member of Commission 40 Radio Astronomy (2015), Member of Commission 51 Bio-Astronomy (2015), Member of Division III Planetary Systems Sciences (2012), Member of Division X Radio Astronomy (2012), and Member of Special Nominating Committee (2000–2003).

He was a member of the USSR Academy of Sciences, Division of General Physics and Astronomy: first as a corresponding (associate) member (12 December 1976), then as a Full Member (21 March 1994), and served as director of the Russian Academy of Sciences Council on Astronomy from 1999 until his death.

He was a participant of the Committee on Space Research as vice president from 1982 to 1986.

== Awards and honors ==
In 1980 he shared the USSR's State Prize for the development and experiments with the orbital radio telescope KRT-10, and in 1988 he shared the USSR's State Prize for the discovery of Radio Recombination Lines. In 2012, Nikolai received the Grote Reber Gold Medal for innovative lifetime contributions to radio astronomy.

== Movie career ==
His first association with the movie industry was in 1981. He was asked to be a consultant on the set of Petlya Oriona, a Russian television series documentary. He played himself in a TV show episode on the documentary series Space's Deepest Secrets in 2018 as well as playing himself in a TV show episode on the documentary series Horizon in 2018.

== Philosophy ==
Kardeshev said "The concepts of morality and goodness are universal, like the Pythagorean theorem. Civilizations do not survive if they do not follow these concepts.”

== Personal life ==
His wife Tamara Valentinovna was also a scientist.

== Death ==
Kardashev died on 3 August 2019, at the age of 87.

== Publications ==
- Kardashev, Nikolai (1985). "On the Inevitability and the Possible Structures of Supercivilizations". The Search for Extraterrestrial Life: Recent Developments. Vol. 112. Boston: International Astronomical Union. pp. 497–504. Bibcode:1985IAUS..112..497K. doi:10.1007/978-94-009-5462-5_65. ISBN 978-90-277-2114-3. S2CID 118286044.
- 1963 - "Candidate of Science" dissertation, later promoted to higher level of doctoral thesis.
- 1964 - “Transmission of Information by Extraterrestrial Civilizations” which presented a classification of civilizations based on their degree of power consumption spanning 20 orders of magnitude, which became known as the Kardashev Scale.

== See also ==
- Megastructure
- Drake equation
- Search for extraterrestrial intelligence (SETI)
- Planetary civilization
- Orders of magnitude (power)
- Orders of magnitude (energy)
- Technological singularity
- World energy supply and consumption
