= Index of physics articles (B) =

The index of physics articles is split into multiple pages due to its size.

To navigate by individual letter use the table of contents below.

== B ==
- B-factory
- B-tagging
- B-theory of time
- B. V. Bowden, Baron Bowden
- B^{2}FH paper
- BBGKY hierarchy
- BCS: 50 Years (book)
- BCS theory
- BESS (experiment)
- BESSY
- BF model
- BKL singularity
- BL Lac object
- BOOMERanG experiment
- BPST instanton
- BRST formalism
- BRST quantization
- BTZ black hole
- BTeV experiment
- BX442
- B Reactor
- B meson
- B − L
- BaBar experiment
- Baby brane
- Bach tensor
- Back-reaction
- Back pressure
- Back scattering alignment
- Background-oriented schlieren technique
- Background count
- Background field method
- Background independence
- Background noise
- Background radiation
- Backscatter
- Backscatter X-ray
- Backward-wave media
- Backward wave oscillator
- Bad Science: The Short Life and Weird Times of Cold Fusion
- Bagger–Lambert–Gustavsson action
- Bagnold formula
- Bahram Mashhoon
- Baien Tomlin
- Baikal Deep Underwater Neutrino Telescope
- Bainbridge mass spectrometer
- Baksan Neutrino Observatory
- Bak–Tang–Wiesenfeld sandpile
- Baldwin–Lomax model
- Balfour Stewart
- Ball bearing motor
- Ball lightning
- Ballistic coefficient
- Ballistic conduction
- Ballistic galvanometer
- Ballistic pendulum
- Ballistic reentry
- Ballistic transport
- Ballotechnics
- Balmer series
- Balseiro Institute
- Balthasar van der Pol
- Balázs Győrffy
- Banana equivalent dose
- Band bending
- Band diagram
- Band gap
- Band mapping
- Band of stability
- Band offset
- Bandwidth-limited pulse
- Banesh Hoffmann
- Bangladesh Council of Scientific and Industrial Research
- Banked turn
- Banks–Zaks fixed point
- Barber–Layden–Power effect
- Bare mass
- Bargeboard (aerodynamics)
- Bargmann's limit
- Bargmann–Wigner equations
- Barkhausen effect
- Barlow's law
- Barlow lens
- Barn (unit)
- Barnett effect
- Baroclinity
- Barotropic
- Barotropic vorticity equation
- Barrel (disambiguation)
- Barrett–Crane model
- Barry M. McCoy
- Barry Simon
- Barton's Pendulums
- Barton Zwiebach
- Baryogenesis
- Baryon
- Baryon Oscillation Spectroscopic Survey
- Baryon acoustic oscillations
- Baryon asymmetry
- Baryon number
- Baryon spectroscopy
- Baryonic dark matter
- Bas Pease
- Bascom S. Deaver
- Base conditions
- Basic concepts of quantum mechanics
- Basic physics of the violin
- Basil Hiley
- Basil Schonland
- Basilis C. Xanthopoulos
- Bass trap
- Basset force
- Basset–Boussinesq–Oseen equation
- Batalin–Vilkovisky formalism
- Batchelor vortex
- Bathochromic shift
- Battelle Memorial Institute
- Beale number
- Beam crossing
- Beam diameter
- Beam divergence
- Beam dump
- Beam emittance
- Beam expander
- Beam homogenizer
- Beam parameter product
- Beam propagation method
- Beam splitter
- Beamline
- Beard and Chuang model
- Beat (acoustics)
- Beatrice Tinsley
- Beaufort scale
- Beckmann thermometer
- Becquerel
- Bedford Level experiment
- Beer–Lambert law
- Beetle (ASIC)
- Behavior of nuclear fuel during a reactor accident
- Behram Kurşunoğlu
- Beijing Electron–Positron Collider II
- Bejan number
- Bekenstein bound
- Bel decomposition
- Belinski–Zakharov transform
- Bell's spaceship paradox
- Bell's theorem
- Bell Labs
- Bell mouth
- Bell test experiments
- Belle experiment
- Belousov–Zhabotinsky reaction
- Belt of Venus
- Beltrami vector field
- Ben Lockspeiser
- Ben Roy Mottelson
- Bending
- Bending moment
- Benedict Friedlaender
- Benedict–Webb–Rubin equation
- Bengt Edlén
- Benjamin Fain
- Benjamin Markarian
- Benjamin Schumacher
- Benjamin W. Lee
- Benjamin–Bona–Mahony equation
- Bennett Lewis
- Benny Lautrup
- Beno Gutenberg
- Benoît Paul Émile Clapeyron
- Berendsen thermostat
- Bergmann's rule
- Berkeley Physics Course
- Bernard Brunhes (physicist)
- Bernard Cohen (physicist)
- Bernard Eastlund
- Bernard F. Schutz
- Bernard H. Lavenda
- Bernard Haisch
- Bernard Julia
- Bernard Katz
- Bernard Lovell
- Bernard Picinbono
- Bernard T. Feld
- Bernard d'Espagnat
- Bernard de Wit
- Bernardo Huberman
- Bernhard Caesar Einstein
- Bernhard Philberth
- Bernhard Schmidt
- Bernoulli's principle
- Berry connection and curvature
- Bert Broer
- Bert Schroer
- Berta Karlik
- Bertha Swirles
- Bertram Batlogg
- Bertram Boltwood
- Bertram Brockhouse
- Bertram Eugene Warren
- Bertrand's theorem
- Bertrand Halperin
- Berzelium
- Beta-M
- Beta-decay stable isobars
- Beta (plasma physics)
- Beta (velocity)
- Beta barium borate
- Beta decay
- Beta function (disambiguation)
- Beta function (physics)
- Beta particle
- Beta plane
- Beta rays
- Betatron
- Bethe ansatz
- Bethe formula
- Bethe lattice
- Bethe–Bloch formula
- Bethe–Feynman formula
- Bethe–Salpeter equation
- Bethe–Weizsäcker formula
- Bethe–Weizsäcker process
- Betti's theorem
- Betz' law
- Bevatron
- Beverly Clock
- Beyond Einstein (book)
- Beyond Einstein program
- Bhabha scattering
- Bhangmeter
- Bhatnagar–Gross–Krook operator
- Bhāskara's wheel
- Bi-hemispherical reflectance
- Bi-isotropic material
- Bi-scalar tensor vector gravity
- Biaxial nematic
- Bibcode
- Bibliography of popular physics books
- Bicycle and motorcycle dynamics
- Bidirectional reflectance distribution function
- Bidirectional scattering distribution function
- Biefeld–Brown effect
- Biermann battery
- Biexciton
- Bifilar coil
- Bifurcation theory
- Big Bang
- Big Bang (Singh book)
- Big Bang nucleosynthesis
- Big Bounce
- Big Crunch
- Big European Bubble Chamber
- Big Freeze
- Big Rip
- Bilayer
- Bilepton
- Bill Wattenburg
- Billiard-ball computer
- Bimetallic strip
- Bimetric theory
- Bimoment
- Binary entropy function
- Binary pulsar
- Binary star
- Binder parameter
- Binding energy
- Binet equation
- Bingham plastic
- Binoviewer
- Bioacoustics
- Bioceramic
- Bioelectromagnetics
- Bioelectromagnetism
- Biogeophysics
- Biological thermodynamics
- Biological transmutation
- Biomaterial
- Biomechanics
- Bion (physics)
- Biophoton
- Biophotonics
- Biophysical Journal
- Biophysical Society
- Biophysical techniques
- Biophysics
- Biot number
- Biot–Savart law
- Biplane
- Bipolaron (physics)
- Biquaternion
- Birch's law
- Birch–Murnaghan equation of state
- Bird flight
- Birefringence
- Birkeland current
- Birkhoff's theorem (electromagnetism)
- Birkhoff's theorem (relativity)
- Birmingham Solar Oscillations Network
- Bismuth strontium calcium copper oxide
- Bispectral analysis
- Bispinor
- Bistatic Doppler shift
- Bistatic range
- Bivector
- Bjarne Tromborg
- Bjerrum defect
- Björn Engquist
- Bjørn Wiik
- Black-Body Theory and the Quantum Discontinuity
- Black-hole cosmology
- BlackLight Power
- Black Holes and Time Warps
- Black Star (semiclassical gravity)
- Black body
- Black brane
- Black hole
- Black hole bomb
- Black hole complementarity
- Black hole electron
- Black hole information paradox
- Black hole starship
- Black hole thermodynamics
- Black light
- Black noise
- Black silicon
- Black star (semiclassical gravity)
- Black string
- Blackbody infrared radiative dissociation
- Blackburn pendulum
- Blackett effect
- Blade element theory
- Blade pitch
- Blaise Pascal
- Blake number
- Blandford–Znajek process
- Blas Cabrera
- Blas Cabrera Felipe
- Blasius boundary layer
- Blast wave
- Blazar
- Blended wing body
- Blinking colloidal nanocrystals
- Bloch-Grüneisen temperature
- Bloch wall
- Bloch's theorem
- Bloch wave – MoM method
- Bloom (test)
- Blown flap
- Blue laser
- Blue shift
- Blueshift
- Bo Sundqvist
- Bo Thidé
- Bob (physics)
- Bob White (geophysicist)
- Body centred cubic metal
- Boeing X-53 Active Aeroelastic Wing
- Bogdan Maglich
- Bogdanov Affair
- Bogoliubov transformation
- Bogoliubov–Parasyuk theorem
- Bogolyubov Prize (NASU)
- Bogolyubov Prize for young scientists
- Bogomol'nyi-Prasad-Sommerfield bound
- Bogomol'nyi–Prasad–Sommerfield bound
- Bohm diffusion
- Bohr magneton
- Bohr model
- Bohr radius
- Bohr–Einstein debates
- Bohr–Sommerfeld theory
- Bohr–van Leeuwen theorem
- Bohumil Kučera
- Boiling point
- Boilover
- Bolometer
- Bolometric correction
- Boltzmann's entropy formula
- Boltzmann-Matano analysis
- Boltzmann Medal
- Boltzmann constant
- Boltzmann distribution
- Boltzmann entropy
- Boltzmann equation
- Boltzmann factor
- Boltzmann relation
- Bond albedo
- Bond number
- Bondi k-calculus
- Bonding in solids
- Bonnard J. Teegarden
- Bonner sphere
- Bonnet's theorem
- Bonnor beam
- Boojum (superfluidity)
- Book of Optics
- Bootstrap model
- Bootstrap paradox
- Borda–Carnot equation
- Borexino
- Boris Aleksandrovich Mamyrin
- Boris Altshuler
- Boris Bakhmeteff
- Boris Borisovich Galitzine
- Boris Chirikov
- Boris Gerasimovich
- Boris Hessen
- Boris Kerner
- Boris Laschka
- Boris Nikolsky
- Boris P. Stoicheff
- Boris Pavlovich Belousov
- Boris Podolsky
- Boris Rauschenbach
- Boris Vorontsov-Velyaminov
- Born approximation
- Born coordinates
- Born probability
- Born rigidity
- Born rule
- Born–Huang approximation
- Born–Infeld model
- Born–Infeld theory
- Born–von Karman boundary condition
- Borrmann effect
- Bose gas
- Bosenova
- Bose–Einstein condensate
- Bose–Einstein condensation (network theory)
- Bose–Einstein correlations
- Bose–Einstein statistics
- Bose–Hubbard model
- Boson
- Boson star
- Bosonic field
- Bosonic string theory
- Bosonization
- Bottom Lambda baryon
- Bottom eta meson
- Bottom quark
- Bottomness
- Bouguer's law
- Bouguer anomaly
- Bouguer plate
- Bound state
- Boundary-layer thickness
- Boundary conformal field theory
- Boundary element method
- Boundary layer
- Boundary layer control
- Boundary layer suction
- Boundary layer transition
- Boundary lubrication
- Boussinesq approximation (buoyancy)
- Boussinesq approximation (water waves)
- Bousso's holographic bound
- Bow shocks in astrophysics
- Bow shock (aerodynamics)
- Bow wave
- Bowen ratio
- Box orbit
- Boyce McDaniel
- Boyd Bartlett
- Boyer–Lindquist coordinates
- Boyle's law
- Bra–ket notation
- Brackett series
- Bragg's law
- Bragg diffraction
- Bragg peak
- Bragg–Gray cavity theory
- Braid statistics
- Brake force
- Bram van Leer
- Branches of physics
- Branching fraction
- Brandon Carter
- Brane cosmology
- Brans–Dicke theory
- Bravais lattice
- Brayton cycle
- Breaking wave
- Breakthrough Propulsion Physics Program
- Breather
- Brebis Bleaney
- Bred vector
- Breit equation
- Bremermann's limit
- Bremsstrahlung
- Brendan Scaife
- Brewster's angle
- Brewster angle microscope
- Brian Cox (physicist)
- Brian David Josephson
- Brian Greene
- Brian L. DeMarco
- Brian May
- Brian Pippard
- Brian Schmidt
- Brian Spalding
- Brian Swimme
- Bridge scour
- Bridgman's thermodynamic equations
- Bridgman effect
- Bridgman–Stockbarger technique
- Brightest cluster galaxy
- Brillouin and Langevin functions
- Brillouin scattering
- Brillouin zone
- Brinell scale
- Brinkman number
- Brinkmann coordinates
- British Atomic Scientists Association
- British Geophysical Association
- Brittleness
- Broad iron K line
- Broken symmetry
- Brooke Benjamin
- Brookhaven National Laboratory
- Brosl Hasslacher
- Brown dwarf
- Brown dwarf desert
- Brownian dynamics
- Brownian motor
- Brownian noise
- Brownian ratchet
- Bruce Allen (physicist)
- Bruce Bolt
- Bruce Cork
- Bruce H. Billings
- Bruce Maccabee
- Bruce Winstein
- Bruno Augenstein
- Bruno Bertotti
- Bruno Pontecorvo
- Bruno Rossi
- Bruno Rossi Prize
- Bruno Thüring
- Bruno Touschek
- Bruno Zumino
- Brunt–Väisälä frequency
- Bruria Kaufman
- Brush discharge
- Bryan Higgins
- Bryce DeWitt
- Bubble chamber
- Bubble fusion
- Bubble ring
- Bubble universe theory
- Bucket argument
- Buckingham (unit)
- Buckingham π theorem
- Buckley–Leverett equation
- Buckling
- Buckypaper
- Bud Grace
- Buffer (optical fiber)
- Building engineering physics
- Bulk density
- Bulk modulus
- Bulk temperature
- Bulletin of the Atomic Scientists
- Bulletin of the Lebedev Physics Institute
- Bullough–Dodd model
- Bumblebee models
- Bunji Sakita
- Bunsaku Arakatsu
- Buoyancy
- Burgers' equation
- Burgers material
- Burgers vector
- Burkard Hillebrands
- Burkhard Heim
- Burns temperature
- Burnup
- Burst noise
- Burt Ovrut
- Burton Richter
- Busemann biplane
- Buttered cat paradox
- Butterfly effect
- Béla Karlovitz
- Bülent Atalay
- B–Bbar oscillation
