= Cebeci =

Cebeci is a Turkish word. It may refer to:

== People ==
- Emrah Cebeci (born 1989), Turkish footballer
- Hilal Cebeci (born 1976), Turkish pop singer
- Tuncer Cebeci (1934-2021), Turkish-American engineer and academic

== Places ==
× Cebeci, Kastamonu, a village in the Central disirict of Kastamonu Province, Turkey

== Other uses ==
- Cebeci (corps), a part of Ottoman artillery corps
- Cebeci Asri Cemetery, a cemetery located in the Cebeci quarter of Ankara, Turkey
- Cebeci İnönü Stadium, a multi-purpose stadium in Ankara, Turkey .
- Cebeci–Smith model, a viscosity model used in computational fluid dynamics analysis
- Cebeci railway station, railway station in Ankara, Turkey
- Cebeci Sport Hall, a multi-purpose sport indoor arena in Istanbul, Turkey
- Cebeci Sports Complex, a sports facility for various sports in Istanbul
