= SBN =

SBN can mean:

- Sehar Broadcasting Network, a television channel in Pakistan
- Sonlife Broadcasting Network of the Jimmy Swaggart Ministries
- Southern Broadcasting Network, in the Philippines
- SB Nation, a sports blogging network
- Former Student Broadcast Network, UK
- Supervision Broadcasting Network, Mongolia
- Small Business Network, by PCM, Inc.
- Sustainable Business Network, New Zealand
- Servizio bibliotecario nazionale, the National Library Service of Italy
- Society of Behavioral Neuroendocrinology
- Standard Book Numbering, which developed into ISBN
- Naval Aircraft Factory SBN, a scout/torpedo bomber from the mid-1930s
- South Bend International Airport, IATA code
- Standard Beatbox Notation
- Strontium barium niobate
- Subtract and branch if negative, computer opcode
