= Laudrup =

Laudrup is the last name of a family of football (soccer) players:

- Finn Laudrup, father of Michael and Brian, former Brøndby IF and Denmark national team.
- Michael Laudrup, former captain of the Denmark national team, former Juventus, Barcelona, Real Madrid and Ajax player among other clubs. Managed Denmark and various clubs.
- Brian Laudrup, former Denmark national team player, former Bayern Munich, AC Milan, Rangers, Chelsea and Ajax player among other clubs.
- Mads Laudrup, son of Michael, retired.
- Andreas Laudrup, son of Michael, retired.
- Nicolai Laudrup, son of Brian, retired.
- Cathrine Laudrup-Dufour, Danish Olympic dressage horse rider

== See also ==
- Benny Lautrup (1939–2025), Danish physicist
