= Odile Macchi =

French physicist and mathematician

- Born: Odile Marie Madeleine Danjou; 1943 (age 82–83); Aurillac, Cantal, France
- Education: EPS; University of Paris-Sud
- Occupations: Physicist; Mathematician
- Spouse: César Macchi
- Children: 4
- Parent(s): Bernard Danjou; Geneviève Féat

Odile Macchi (born Odile Danjou: 1943) is a French physicist and mathematician. She has been a member of the French Academy of Sciences since 2004.

== Life ==
Odile Danjou was born in Aurillac (Cantal) during the German occupation. She is one of the six recorded children of Bernard Danjou and his wife, born Geneviève Féat.

Between 1963 and 1966 she studied at the École normale supérieure de jeunes filles (subsequently merged with the École normale supérieure (EPS)), emerging with a double degree in physics and maths. It was also in 1966 that she received her "agrégation" (teaching certificate) in Maths. The unusual combination of her qualifications opened the door to a position as a research assistant at the Institute of Basic Electronics at the University of Paris-Sud where she was able to work with Bernard Picinbono. The focus of her work was on signal processing: it involved extensive modelling and physical analysis of materials and use of mathematically based statistical techniques.

She successfully defended her doctoral dissertation in physical sciences in 1972, dealing with "the contribution to theoretical study of point process, and its application to statistical optics and optical communications". She now moved on, as she puts it, from pure maths "to impure maths" ("Je suis passée aux maths impures"). In this she was encouraged by César Macchi, the polytechnician, telecommunications engineer and university professor whom she had married a few years earlier. She continued to centre her work on signal processing, with a particular focus on the newly emerging digital revolution. It was a field in which her husband was playing a pioneering role, and for the next seven years, until César Macchi's early death from cancer, they frequently collaborated in their research.

In 1989, Odile Macchi was elevated to the grade of IEEE fellow for contribution to adaptive filtering in communications and signal processing.

Odile Macchi held senior research positions at the French National Centre of Scientific Research and at the Laboratory of Systems and Signals at the University of Paris-Sud from 1972, appointed to a research directorship at both institutions in 1979. Much of her research work, over the years, has supported practical developments in modem technology. She became an emeritus research director at the two institutions in 1999.

Odile Macchi was just 33 when she was widowed. She told an interviewer that she knew at once that she would never remarry, and she never has. Her four children were aged between 3 and 12 in 1976. She responded to her bereavement by addressing her scientific research work with renewed commitment and energy, while also finding strength in her Christian faith, and through participation in the "Fraternitat Santa Maria de la Resurrecció", a church based group created at Lourdes in 1943 to share support between young widows.

Odile Macchi was elected a corresponding member of the French Academy of Sciences in 1994. Ten years later she was elected to full membership.

=== Awards and honours (selection) ===
- 1980 Blondel medal
- 1989 IEEE fellow.
- 2004 Legion of Honour (chevallier)
- 2008 National Order of Merit (Officer)
