= Burns temperature =

Property of ferroelectric materials

The Burns temperature, T_{d}, is the temperature where a ferroelectric material, previously in paraelectric state, starts to present randomly polarized nanoregions, that are polar precursor clusters. This behaviour is typical of several, but not all, ferroelectric materials, and was observed in lead titanate (PbTiO_{3}), potassium niobate (KNbO_{3}), lead lanthanum zirconate titanate (PLZT), lead magnesium niobate (PMN), lead zinc niobate (PZN), K_{2}Sr_{4}(NbO_{3})_{10}, and strontium barium niobate (SBN), Na_{1/2}Bi_{1/2}O_{3} (NBT).

The Burns temperature, named from Gerald Burns, who studied this phenomenon with collaboration of Frank H. Dacol, has not been well understood yet.
