= Ludwig Biermann =

German astronomer (1907–1986)

- Born: March 13, 1907; Hamm, North Rhine-Westphalia
- Died: January 12, 1986 (aged 78); Munich, Germany
- Education: Göttingen University
- Known for: Biermann battery

Ludwig Franz Benedikt Biermann (March 13, 1907 – January 12, 1986) was a German astronomer, obtaining his Ph.D. from Göttingen University in 1932.

He made important contributions to astrophysics and plasma physics, discovering the Biermann battery. He predicted the existence of the solar wind based on the study of cometary tails, which he dubbed "solar corpuscular radiation"; the theory was later developed by Eugene Parker.

He was a visiting scholar at the Institute for Advanced Study in the fall of 1961. He won the Bruce Medal in 1967 and the Gold Medal of the Royal Astronomical Society in 1974.

Asteroid 73640 Biermann is named in his honor.
