= Directional-hemispherical reflectance =

Directional-hemispherical reflectance is the reflectance of a surface under direct illumination (with no diffuse component). Directional-hemispherical reflectance is the integral of the bidirectional reflectance distribution function over all viewing directions. It is sometimes called "black-sky albedo".

== See also ==
- Bi-hemispherical reflectance
