= Cebeci–Smith model =

The Cebeci–Smith model, developed by Tuncer Cebeci and Apollo M. O. Smith in 1967, is a 0-equation eddy viscosity model used in computational fluid dynamics analysis of turbulence in boundary layer flows. The model gives eddy viscosity, $\mu_t$, as a function of the local boundary layer velocity profile. The model is suitable for high-speed flows with thin attached boundary layers, typically present in aerospace applications. Like the Baldwin-Lomax model, it is not suitable for large regions of flow separation and significant curvature or rotation. Unlike the Baldwin-Lomax model, this model requires the determination of a boundary layer edge.

== Equations ==
In a two-layer model, the boundary layer is considered to comprise two layers: inner (close to the surface) and outer. The eddy viscosity is calculated separately for each layer and combined using:

$$\mu_t =
\begin{cases}
{\mu_t}_\text{inner} & \mbox{if } y \le y_\text{crossover} \\
{\mu_t}_\text{outer} & \mbox{if } y > y_\text{crossover}
\end{cases}$$

where $y_\text{crossover}$ is the smallest distance from the surface where ${\mu_t}_\text{inner}$ is equal to ${\mu_t}_\text{outer}$.

The inner-region eddy viscosity is given by:

$${\mu_t}_\text{inner} = \rho \ell^2 \left[\left(
\frac{\partial U}{\partial y}\right)^2 +
\left(\frac{\partial V}{\partial x}\right)^2
\right]^{1/2}$$

where

$$\ell = \kappa y \left( 1 - e^{-y^+/A^+} \right)$$

with the von Karman constant $\kappa$ usually being taken as 0.4, and with

$$A^+ = 26\left[1+y\frac{dP/dx}{\rho u_\tau^2}\right]^{-1/2}$$

The eddy viscosity in the outer region is given by:

$${\mu_t}_\text{outer} = \alpha \rho U_e \delta_v^* F_K$$

where $\alpha=0.0168$, $\delta_v^*$ is the displacement thickness, given by

$$\delta_v^* = \int_0^\delta \left(1 - \frac{U}{U_e}\right)\,dy$$

and F_{K} is the Klebanoff intermittency function given by

$$F_K = \left[1 + 5.5 \left( \frac{y}{\delta} \right)^6
\right]^{-1}$$
