= Tuncer Cebeci =

Turkish American engineer and academic (1934–2021)

- Born: August 25, 1934; Turkey
- Died: March 28, 2021 (aged 86); Los Angeles, California, United States
- Education: Robert College; Duke University; North Carolina State University
- Known for: Cebeci–Smith model
- Spouse: Sylvia Ann (née Holt) (1941–2012) (m. 1963–2012)
- Children: 3
- Scientific career
- Fields: Aerodynamics
- Workplaces: California State University, Long Beach,

Tuncer Cebeci (born August 25, 1934 – March 28, 2021) was a Turkish-American mechanical engineer and academic. He worked at Douglas Aircraft Company, and later he founded and chaired the Aerospace Engineering Department at California State University in Long Beach, USA. He authored books and scientific articles on fluid dynamics.

== Early years and education ==
Tuncer Cebeci was born to Rabia and Ömer on August 25, 1934, in Turkey. He had a brother, Dinçer (1938–2004), who was a lawyer and racing horses owner. He was raised in Turkey, and graduated from Robert College in Istanbul with B.S. degrees in electrical and mechanical engineering. He then went to the United States, and attended Duke University in Durham, North Carolina, where he received an M.S. degree in mechanical engineering. In 1963, he married at New Hope Methodist Church in Winston-Salem, North Carolina to Sylvia Ann Holt (born 1941), whom he had met at the university two years prior. The next year, Cebeci received his doctoral degree in mechanical engineering from North Carolina State University in Raleigh.

== Professional career ==
After completing his doctoral studies, Cebeci moved with wife and their newborn daughter to Long Beach, California to join Douglas Aircraft Company as a research scientist. In 1974, he was promoted to head of the department of aerodynamics research. He became the first distinguished professor in the mechanical engineering department of California State University (CSU) in Long Beach in 1977. In 1982, he became the company's first senior fellow. Cebeci founded the Department of Aerospace engineering at CSU, Long Beach, and became the chairman of the department in 1998.

== Family and death ==
Cebeci and his wife Sylvia Ann undertook many worldwide travels. They raised two daughters, Rabia and Leyla, and a son, Bradley Omer, who became a lawyer. Rabia married to Philip Weiss. The eldest of their three children, Jordan Tate Weiss (1993–2011), died after a skateboarding accident. Cebeci lost his wife in 2012. Tuncer Cebeci died at age 86 in Los Angeles, California, United States on March 28, 2021.

== Works ==
He authored 20 books and published over 300 technical journal articles. He worked on computational fluid dynamics. He is the co-developer of the Cebeci-Smith model for mathematical turbulence analysis.

Some of his books are:

- Cebeci, Tuncer (1974). Analysis of Turbulent Boundary Layers. New York: Academic Press. p. 404. ISBN 978-0-12-164650-9.
- Cebeci, Tuncer; Peter Bradshaw (1977). Momentum transfer in boundary layers. Washington: Hemisphere Publishing. ISBN 978-0-07-010300-9.
- Cebeci, Tuncer; Peter Bradshaw (1988). Physical and Computational Aspects of Convective Heat Transfer. Springer + Basic. Bibcode:1988pcac.book.....C. doi:10.1007/978-1-4612-3918-5. ISBN 978-0-387-96821-6.
- Cebeci, Tuncer (2004). Turbulence Models and Their Application: Efficient Numerical Methods with Computer Programs.
- Cebeci, Tuncer (2004). Stability and transition : theory and application : efficient numerical methods with computer programs. Long Beach: Springer Verlag. p. 262.
- Cebeci, Tuncer (2005). Modeling and Computation of Boundary-Layer Flows: Laminar, Turbulent and Transitional Boundary Layers in Incompressible and Compressible Flows – Hardcover. Springer Verlag.
- Cebeci, Tuncer; Jian P. Shao; Fassi Kafyeke; Eric Laurendeau (2005). Computational Fluid Dynamics for Engineers: From Panel to Navier-Stokes Methods with Computer Programs. Long Beach, California: Springer. ISBN 978-3-540-24451-6.

== Honors ==
- 1984 – "Fluid and Plasma Dynamics Award" from the American Institute of Aeronautics and Astronautics (AIAA),
- 1987 – "Distinguished Alumni Award" from the North Carolina State University,
- 1988 – "Presidential Science Award" from Turkey,
- 1993 – "Aerodynamics Award" from the AIAA,
- 1993 – "Distinguished Fellow Award" from McDonnell Douglas.
