= Vena contracta =

Narrowest point in a fluid stream

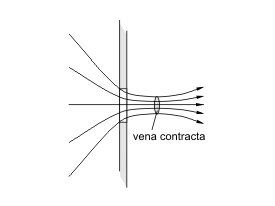
Vena contracta

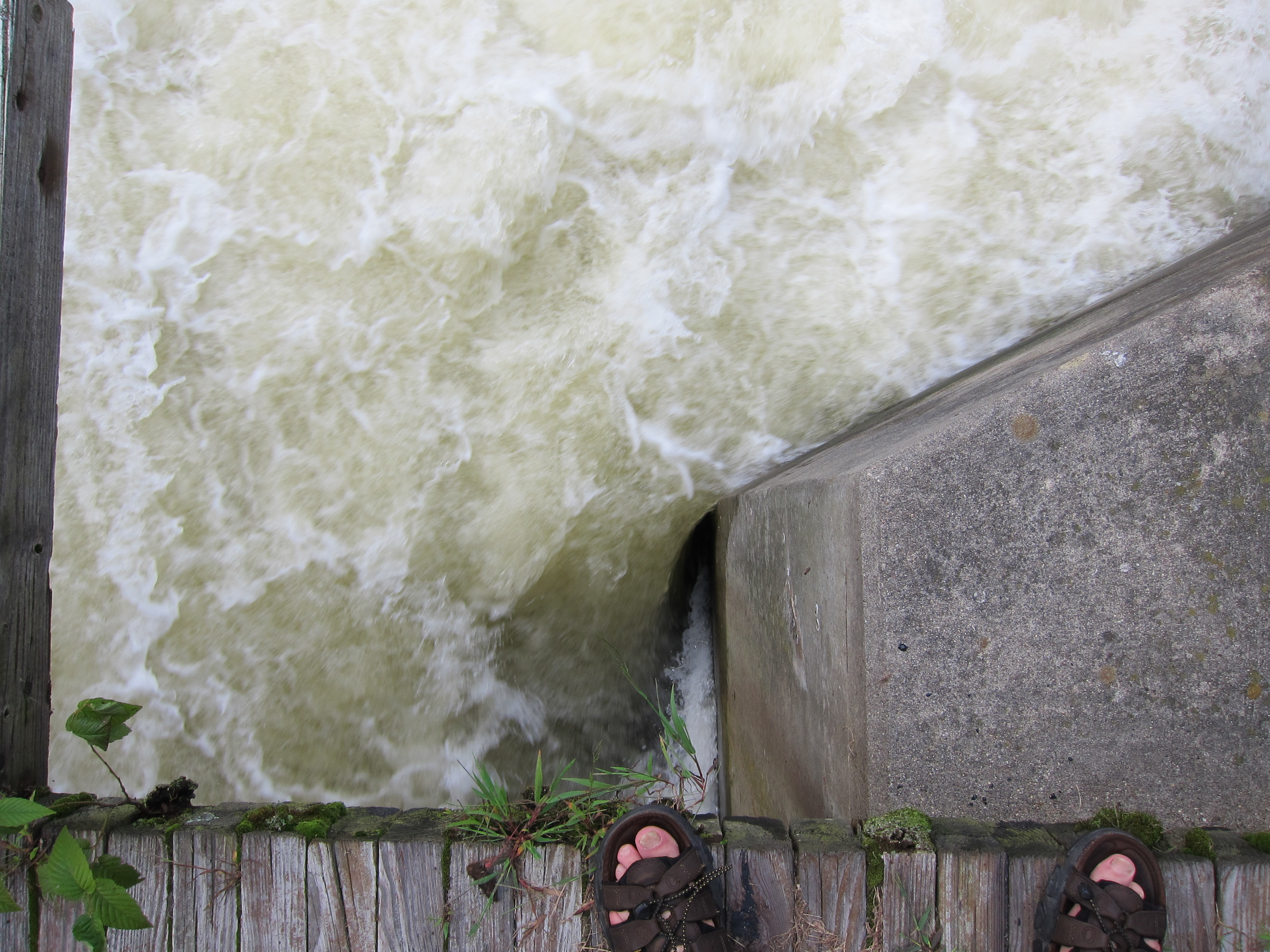
Just beyond the Swartswood Lake Dam, the river is forced to narrow by a concrete bridge support. Flow separation is evident at the sharp bend, just above the vena contracta

Vena contracta is the point in a fluid stream where the diameter of the stream is the least, and the fluid velocity is at its maximum, such as in the case of a stream issuing out of a nozzle (orifice). (Evangelista Torricelli, 1643). It is a place where the cross section area is minimal. The maximum contraction takes place at a section slightly downstream of the orifice, where the jet is more or less horizontal.

The effect is also observed in flow from a tank into a pipe, or a sudden contraction in pipe diameter. Streamlines will converge just downstream of the diameter change, and a region of separated flow occurs at the sharp corner of the diameter change and extends past the vena contracta.

The formation of the vena contracta can be seen in the venturimeter.

== Explanation ==
The reason for this phenomenon is that fluid streamlines cannot abruptly change direction. In the case of both the free jet and the sudden pipe diameter change, the streamlines are unable to closely follow the sharp angle in the pipe/tank wall. The converging streamlines follow a smooth path, which results in the narrowing of the jet (or primary pipe flow).

== Echocardiography ==
Measurement of the vena contracta is useful in echocardiography, where it describes the smallest area of the blood flow jet as it exits a heart valve. This corresponds to the effective orifice area (EOA) calculated for heart valves using the continuity equation.

== Shotguns ==
Vena Contracta was a term used by several English shotgun builders of the 19th and 20th Century. The gun barrels of sporting shotguns tapered very heavily from the breech to the muzzle. Thus a gun with a 12 bore breech would have a 20 bore muzzle. The idea was to retain the advantages of a heavy-hitting large bore shotgun while retaining the lesser recoil and easy maneuverability of a small bore. Several leading firms built this type of gun but it proved unpopular and most were returned to the manufacturers for large bore barrels. To most shooters perhaps the idea of placing a 12 bore cartridge into a 20 bore barrel was too "explosive". Complete functioning examples are now rare, though they are still not highly sought after.

== Coefficient of contraction ==
The coefficient of contraction is defined as the ratio between the area of the jet at the vena contracta and the area of the orifice.

C_{c} = Area at vena contracta/Area of orifice.

The typical value may be taken as 0.611 for a sharp orifice (concentric with the flow channel). The smaller the value, the greater the effect the vena contracta has.

== See also ==
- Bell mouth
- Borda–Carnot equation
