= Potassium niobate =

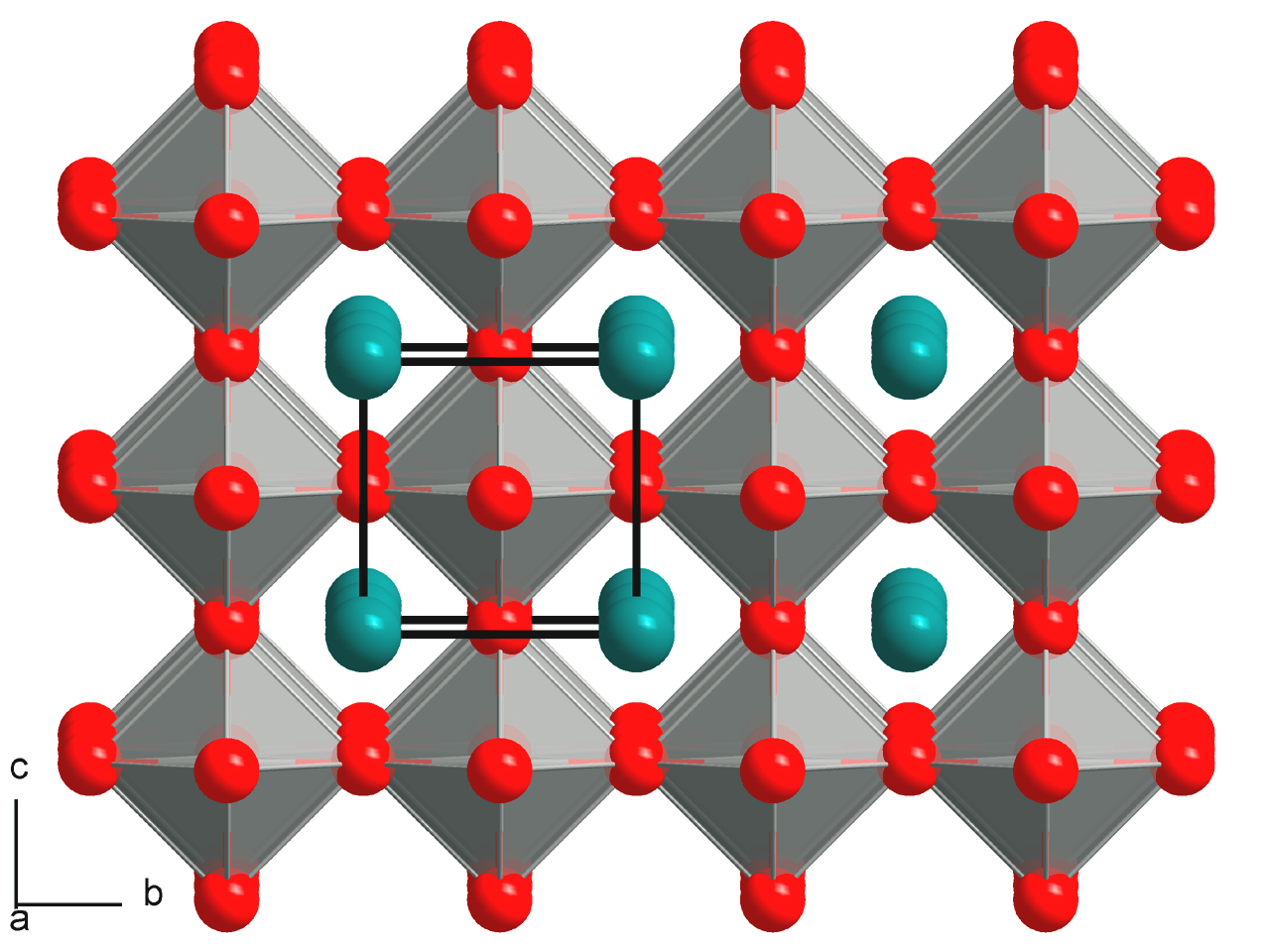

Names
- IUPAC name Potassium niobate
- Other names: Niobium potassium oxide; Potassium columbate

Identifiers
| CAS Number | 12030-85-2 |
| 3D model (JSmol) | Interactive image |
| ChemSpider | 10605809 |
| ECHA InfoCard | 100.031.573 |
| PubChem CID | 23689307; 166177182 (incorrect formula) |
| CompTox Dashboard (EPA) | DTXSID90923315 |
- InChI: InChI=1S/K.Nb.3O/q+1;;;;-1 Key: UKDIAJWKFXFVFG-UHFFFAOYSA-N
- SMILES: [O-] [Nb](=O)=O.[K+]

Properties
| Chemical formula | KNbO_{3} |
| Molar mass | 180.003 g·mol^{−1} |
| Appearance | White rhombohedral crystals |
| Density | 4.640 g/cm^{3} |
| Melting point | ≈ 1100 °C |

Hazards
- Lethal dose or concentration (LD, LC)
| LD_{50} (median dose) | 3000 mg/kg (oral, rat) |

Related compounds
| Other anions | Potassium chlorate Potassium bromate |
| Other cations | Lithium niobate Strontium barium niobate |
- Except where otherwise noted, data are given for materials in their standard state (at 25 °C [77 °F], 100 kPa). Infobox references

Potassium niobate (KNbO_{3}) is an inorganic compound with the formula KNbO_{3}. A colorless solid, it is classified as a perovskite ferroelectric material. It exhibits nonlinear optical properties, and is a component of some lasers. Nanowires of potassium niobate have been used to produce tunable coherent light.

== Structure ==
On cooling from high temperature, KNbO_{3} undergoes a series of structural phase transitions. At 435 °C, the crystal symmetry changes from cubic centrosymmetric (Pm3̅m) to tetragonal non-centrosymmetric (P4mm). On further cooling, at 225 °C the crystal symmetry changes from tetragonal (P4mm) to orthorhombic (Amm2) and at −50 °C from orthorhombic (Amm2) to rhombohedral (R3m).

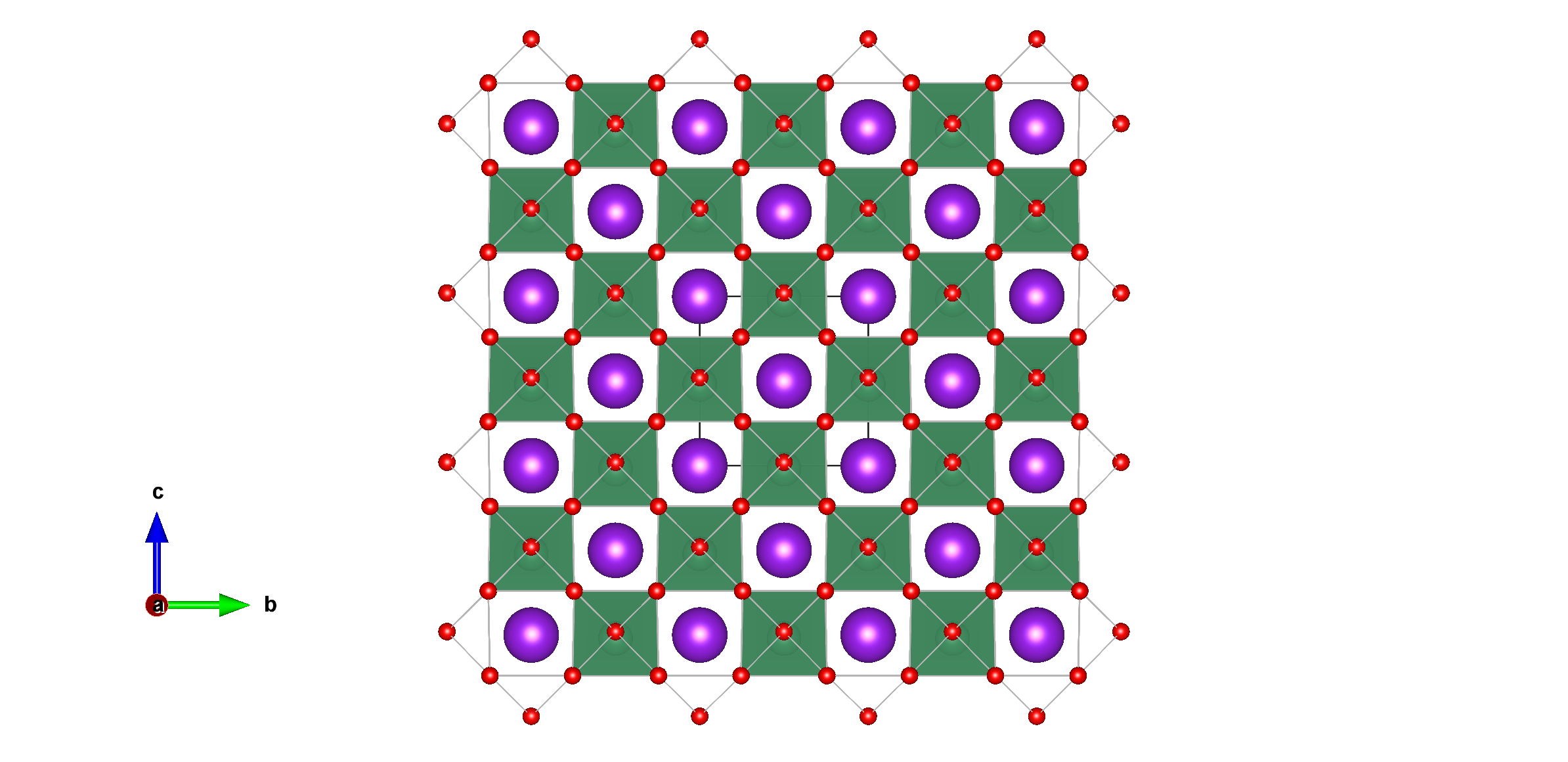
Crystal structure of Potassium Niobate

== Applications and research ==
In addition to research in electronic memory storage, potassium niobate is used in resonant doubling. This technique allows small infrared lasers to convert output into blue light, a critical technology for the production of blue lasers and technology dependent upon them.

Potassium niobate has been found useful in many different areas of materials science, including properties of lasers, quantum teleportation, and it has been used to study the optical properties of particulate composite materials.
