= Apollo M. O. Smith =

American aerospace engineer (1911–1997)

- Born: July 2, 1911; Columbia, Missouri.
- Died: May 1, 1997 (aged 85)
- Education: Woodrow Wilson High School; California Institute of Technology
- Engineering career
- Discipline: Aerospace
- Employers: Douglas Aircraft; UCLA
- Significant advance: computational fluid dynamics

Apollo Milton Olin Smith (usually referred to as A.M.O. Smith) (born July 2, 1911 – May 1, 1997) was an important figure in the aerodynamics field at Douglas Aircraft from 1938 to 1975 and an early pioneer in the area of computational fluid dynamics.

== Early life ==
A.M.O. Smith was born in Columbia, Missouri. He graduated from Woodrow Wilson High School in Long Beach, California in 1929 and went on to study at Compton Junior College in Compton, California and finally the California Institute of Technology in Pasadena, California, where he received his BS in 1936 and his MS in 1938. While at Long Beach, he was a member of the Long Beach Glider Club along with John Pierce, one of the earliest glider clubs in southern California. While at Caltech, he built and tested a number of rockets with Professor Theodore von Kármán's students Frank Malina, Edward Forman, Jack Parsons and Tsien Hsue-shen. This work led to the formation of Aerojet and the Jet Propulsion Laboratory several years later.

== Career ==
In June 1938, Smith was hired by the El Segundo Division of Douglas Aircraft. During his time there, he worked on aerodynamic and preliminary design problems of the DC-5, SBD Dauntless, DB-7 Boston, A-20 Havoc and A-26 Invader. In October 1942 he went on a leave of absence, at the request of General H.H. Arnold, to help organize and develop the newly formed Aerojet company as its first Chief Engineer. Under his guidance, the engineering organization at Aerojet grew from six people to over 400 by the time he left. This period saw the development and quantity production of the JATO type rocket at Aerojet.

After he returned to Douglas Aircraft in March 1944, he resumed work in aerodynamics and preliminary design. He was responsible for the detailed aerodynamic design of the D-558-I Skystreak, which for a period held the world speed record. He was also responsible for the design of the F3D-1 Skynight.

At the end of World War II, he was a member of the US Naval Technical Mission in Europe. In his three months touring captured German aeronautical facilities, he became familiar with the German work on the low drag properties of swept wings at transonic speeds and their development of tailless aircraft.

After returning to Douglas, he proposed and began studies for a tailless aircraft. These studies culminated in the design and production of the F4D-1 Skyray interceptor. For a period, the F4D-1 held six FAI World Records, including absolute speed and climb performance. In 1948, he became the Supervisor of Design Research at Douglas, a position he held until 1954. During this period, he conducted research into a number of areas, including laminar flow control and a means of calculating low speed flow about arbitrary bodies - Computational Fluid Dynamics. In 1954 he became Supervisor of Aerodynamics Research and from 1969 to 1975 he was Chief Aerodynamics Engineer - Research at Douglas. In this period, he oversaw development of practical methods of analyzing laminar and turbulent boundary layer flow, new and improved static pressure probes, the hydrogen bubble technique of flow visualization, potential flow analysis, analysis of stability and transition of boundary layers and the e^{n} method of predicting boundary layer transition. In June 1975, he retired from what was then McDonnell Douglas.

After retiring, he was appointed adjunct professor at UCLA, a position he held from 1975 to 1980.

== Personal life ==
Smith was married to Elisabeth Caroline Krost on December 5, 1943. They had three children.

== See also ==
- Cebeci–Smith model
- Guggenheim Aeronautical Laboratory
