= Bio-geoengineering =

Form of climate engineering

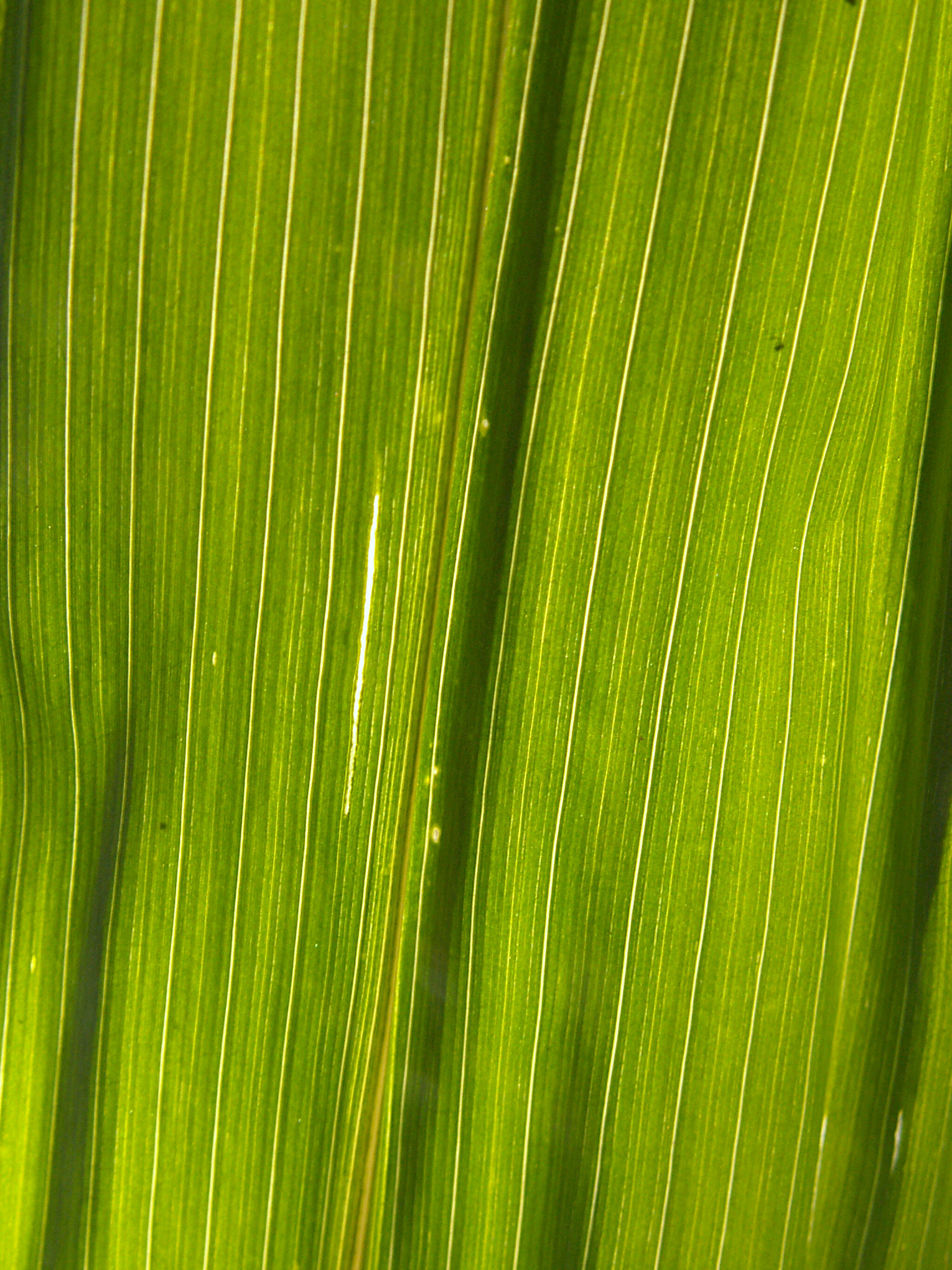
Close-up of the amount of sunlight coming through an individual corn leaf

Bio-geoengineering is a form of climate engineering which seeks to increase the solar reflectivity (or albedo) of crops by modifying physiological leaf and/or canopy traits to help reduce regional surface warming.

== Crop Albedo Modification ==
Bio-geoengineering relies on the manipulation of crop attributes, such as through selective plant breeding or genetic engineering, to increase a crop's net albedo. Although there are noticeable differences in albedo between distinct crop types, bio-geoengineering mainly focuses on intra crop modification and substitution, which inherently limits its overall albedo change, but the changes are much easier to be implemented.

The net albedo of a set of crops can be broken down into two contributing layers: the reflectivity of individual crop leaves and the overall canopy's effective albedo due to position, angle, and coverage of leaves.

=== Leaf Glossiness ===
At the individual leaf level, the base amount of light reflected by a given leaf depends largely on the type of crop and the wavelength of light you are concerned with. It is possible to alter a crop leaf's net (or specific wavelength) reflectivity either through selective breeding and/or genetic engineering, or through applying a sort of reflective spray (potentially alongside pre-existing pesticides) directly to the leaves.

For the visible light part of the electromagnetic spectrum, plant stress has been found to directly correlate to increased reflectivity of certain visible wavelengths. However, when you average over the entire visible spectrum with larger chlorophyll contents, it has been found that there is a strong positive relationship between plant chlorophyll content and reflectivity.

As for near infrared wavelengths, which contribute about 50% of the total solar radiation energy at sea level, there is a negative relationship between plant hydration and reflectivity. This, on top of the fact that this effect is less prominent at the canopy level, makes it unlikely that reflectivity of near infrared wavelengths will be modified for the purposes of bio-geoengineering.

=== Canopy Morphology ===
When attempting to modify the net albedo of crops on a larger scale (ex. a field of crops or, as would be required to achieve any significant amount of global cooling, entire regions of the world), the varying morphological traits of crop canopies contributes far more than the differences in reflectivity of individual crop leaves. When sunlight shines down on a field of crops, some of it will hit and reflect off of the crops (and in most cases their leaves), while the rest of the reflected light will be from the background soil. Thus the overall reflectivity of a crop canopy is largely dependent on the orientation, angle, and placement of the leaves (which can be measured by the leaf area index and leaf angle distribution), as well as the albedo of the background soil.

== Advantages ==
Because of its inherently low invasiveness (especially in terms of land use change and pre-existing food production systems) compared to other forms of geoengineering, bio-geoengineering has been argued to offer multiple advantages and much fewer risks. One advantage is the fact that pre-existing infrastructure is already adequate in propagating these specific traits to large-scale crop cultivations. Another is that for specifically food crops, which make up the vast majority of arable crops, an annual system of replanting modified crop varieties already exists in order to keep up with the modern science in designing plants to be more resistant to negative external factors (in order to achieve higher yield and quality), which makes the process of automatically introducing a new crop variety very much doable, even at a large scale.

== Concerns ==
On certain parts of the electromagnetic spectrum, the absorptance of crop leaves is sometimes directly tied to the overall healthiness and yield of said crop, so there must be a balancing act between maximizing reflectivity of individual leaves while ensuring it does not negatively impact overall crop production.
