= Bernard H. Lavenda =

American-born Italian academic and scientist

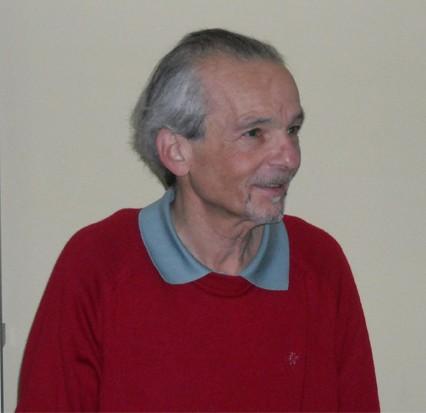
- Bernard H. Lavenda
- Born: 18 September 1945 (age 81); New York City, U.S.
- Awards: Telesio-Galilei Academy Award in 2009
- Scientific career
- Fields: Physics

Bernard Howard Lavenda (born September 18, 1945) is a retired professor of chemical physics at the University of Camerino and expert on irreversible thermodynamics. He has contributed to many areas of physics, including that of Brownian motion, and in the establishment of the statistical basis of thermodynamics, and non-Euclidean geometrical theories of relativity. He was the scientific coordinator of the "European Thermodynamics Network" in the European Commission Program of Human Capital and Mobility. He was also a proponent for the establishment of, and scientific director of, a National (Italian) Centre for Thermodynamics, and has acted as scientific consultant to companies such as the ENI Group, where he helped to found TEMA, a consulting firm for SNAM Progetti, ENEA (Italian National Agency for New Technologies, Energy and the Environment), and the Solar Energy Research Institute in Golden, Colorado. He has had over 130 scientific papers published in international journals, some critical of the new fashions and modes in theoretical physics.

Professor Lavenda currently lives in Trevignano Romano near Rome, is married with two adult children and two grandchildren, for whom his textbook "A New Perspective on Thermodynamics" is dedicated.

== Biography ==
=== Early years ===
Bernard H. Lavenda was born in New York City. After completing secondary school in North Adams, Massachusetts, he attended Clark University where he graduated cum laude in 1966 with a B.Sc in chemistry. Having passed the entrance examination for the doctoral program at the Weizmann Institute of Science, he began experimental work on enzymes under the direction of Ephraim Katzir, who was later to become the President of Israel. Realizing that he was not made out for experimental work, he came under the influence of Ephraim's brother, Aaron, after reading his book Nonequilibrium Thermodynamics in Biophysics, coauthored with Peter Curran.

After the Six Days War, Aaron Katchalsky helped him secure a studentship for a doctoral degree in Ilya Prigogine's group in Brussels.

=== Doctoral thesis ===
His doctoral thesis, "Kinetic analysis and thermodynamic interpretation of nonequilibrium unstable transitions in open systems", showed that when homogeneous nonlinear chemical reactions far from equilibrium on the thermodynamic branch, which is an extension of the law of mass action at equilibrium, become unstable they make transitions to kinetic branches with lower entropy production than the thermodynamic branch.

This result was initially contested by Prigogine who reasoned from hydrodynamic instabilities, like the Rayleigh-Benard instability, which show a larger entropy production beyond the critical point in order to maintain spatial structures. Prigogine later considered these spatial structures to be produced by unstable chemically diffusing systems, based on Alan Turing's morphological models, calling them 'dissipative structures' and for which Prigogine received the Nobel Prize in Chemistry in 1977.

Prigogine later acknowledged that such transitions to lower states of entropy reduction were possible since no spatial structural changes were involved, and later incorporated Lavenda's work into a chapter of his new book Thermodynamic Theory of Structure, Stability, and Fluctuations, co-authored with Paul Glansdorff. After receiving his doctorate from the Universite Libre de Bruxelles, with la plus grande distinction, he returned to Israel in 1970 to work as a post-doctoral student in the Physical Chemistry Department of the Hebrew University. During that period he published a short note in the Italian physics journal, Lettere Al Nuovo Cimento [3 (1972) 385-390] criticizing the Glansdorff-Prigogine universal criteria of evolution which attributes an inequality to a potential which is a function only of intensive variables, the forces. He pointed out that no such thermodynamic potential could exist for it would be devoid of all information regarding how large the system is, or how many particles it contains. The inequality would be a criterion of stability, but, on account of the assumption of local (stable) equilibrium of the components that the system is broken up into, the sum of stable components can hardly become unstable. The note would probably have gone unnoticed were it not for Peter Landsberg's citation of it in his Nature review of the Glansdorff-Prigogine book [P. T. Landsberg, "The fourth law of thermodynamics"], where he predicted "the occasional lack of lucidity in the book which may give rise to some discussion within the next few years".

=== Career ===
==== Consultancies ====
After the murder of Aharon Katzir in Lod Airport massacre in May 1972, Lavenda accepted a position of consultant at Nuovo Pignone in Florence Italy together with a teaching position at the University of Pisa. Through the vice President of Nuovo Pignone, he came into contact with Vicenzo Gervasio who was later to become President of ENI Data, and the idea crystallized of setting up a company dedicated to the analysis and dynamic modeling of fouling processes in refineries and reactors. He established relations between ENI and Northwest Research, Boeing, and SERI (Solar Energy Research Institute). He helped form a new company within the ENI group, TEMA, which was supported by SNAM Progetti. While retaining an unpaid lectureship in Thermodynamics at the University of Naples, Lavenda published his critical appraisal of the then current theories of irreversible thermodynamics, Thermodynamics of Irreversible Processes, in 1978. It was originally published by the Macmillan Press and later became a Dover Classic of Science and Mathematics.

==== Camerino years ====
In 1980 he won a chair in Physical Chemistry. Transferring to Camerino, he was to spend more than three decades there. His first book during this period, "Nonequilibrium Statistical Thermodynamics", published by Wiley in 1985, developed the nonlinear generalization of the Onsager-Machlup formulation of nonequilibrium fluctuations which was restricted to linear (Gaussian) processes. Just as equilibrium is characterized by the state of maximum entropy, corresponding to maximum probability, nonequilibrium states are characterized by the principle of least dissipation of energy, corresponding to the maximum probability of a transition between nonequilibrium states that are not well-separated in time. This principle can be generalized to non-Gaussian fluctuations in the limit of small thermal noise and constitutes a kinetic analog to Boltzmann's principle.

During a sabbatical year in 1986 in Porto Alegre, Lavenda had ample time to browse through the well-furnished library at the Universidade Federale di Rio Grande del Sud. He was impressed by the parallelism between statistical inference and statistical thermodynamics: two distinct and separate branches that are essentially working on the same problems but with no apparent connection. His work, summarized in Statistical Physics: A Probabilistic Approach, published by Wiley-Interscience in 1991, completes Boltzmann's principle, which expresses the entropy as the logarithm of a combinatorial factor, by showing that the entropy is the potential that determines Gauss’ law of error for which the average value is the most probable value. Just as there are frequency and degree- of-belief (Bayes' theorem) interpretations of statistical inference, the same should apply to statistical thermodynamics. The frequency interpretation applies to extensive variables, like energy and volume which can be sampled, while the degree-of-belief interpretations applies to the intensive variables, like temperature and pressure, for which sampling has no meaning. The connection between the two branches translates the Cramer-Rao inequality into thermodynamic uncertainty relations, analogous to quantum mechanical uncertainty relations, where the more knowledge we have about a thermodynamic variable the less we know about its conjugate. Since the lack of a probability distribution means the absence of its statistics, the possibility of an intermediate statistics, or what is referred to as parastatistics, between Bose–Einstein statistics and Fermi–Dirac statistics is nonexistent.

Statistical thermodynamics is usually concerned with most probable behavior which becomes almost certainty if large enough samples are taken. But sometimes surprises are in store where extreme behavior becomes the prevalent one. Turning his attention to such rare events Lavenda published Thermodynamics of Extremes in 1995, whose real interest lies in the formulation of a thermodynamics of earthquakes that was subsequently published in Annali di Geofisica (Extreme value statistics and thermodynamics of earthquakes: "Large earthquakes"; "aftershock sequences"), and which is gaining increasing attention. By properly defining entropy and energy, a temperature can be associated to an aftershock sequence giving it an additional means of characterization. A new magnitude-frequency relation is predicted which applies to clustered after-shocks in contrast to the [Gutenberg-Richter law] which treats them as independent and identically distributed random events.

==== Attempts at forming a centre for thermodynamics ====
In the nineties, Lavenda saw thermodynamics as a cultural heritage that could have a place in Italian society, and would be pertinent to both industrial research and to the preservation of its artistic patrimony. He was a proponent for the establishment of a National Centre of Thermodynamics for which financial funding was unavailable. Capturing the interest of the ENEA, or the Italian agency for alternative energy resources, he applied for funding in the European Commission of Human Capital and Mobility Programme. His project, "Thermodynamics of Complex Systems", came in sixth place in Chemistry section with maximum funding in 1992. This led to the formation of a European Thermodynamics Network consisting of 16 partners in the EU and Switzerland. It was later extended to the Eastern European Countries in the European Commission PECO Programme. This eventually led to the establishment of a National Centre for Thermodynamics that was brought into existence by the ENEA, but lasted only several months, because European funds were absorbed by other projects

==== Later years ====
Often critical of new fashions and modes in thermodynamics, Lavenda wrote A New Perspective on Thermodynamics, published in 2009, by returning to Carnot's original conception that work can only be done when there is a difference in temperature, and the necessity of closing the cycle before that work can be assessed. More recently Lavenda has directed his interests to relativity by providing it with a new foundation based on non-Euclidean geometries. Rather than measuring distances in terms of the usual Euclidean metric, distances are defined in terms of what is known as a cross-ratio, a perspective invariant of four points, which, for the space of velocities, just happens to be the compounding of longitudinal Doppler shifts. Doppler shifts are fundamental to relativity: oblique Doppler shifts describe aberration, while second order ones describe length contraction, but rather than being in the direction of the motion are perpendicular to it. The uniformly rotating disc, which is considered by some to be the missing link in Einstein's formulation of general relativity, is exactly described by the hyperbolic metric in polar coordinates, named after the nineteenth century Italian geometer Eugenio Beltrami, which predicts the circumference of the disc to be greater when in motion than when it is at rest. Thus a uniformly rotating disc belongs to hyperbolic, and not Euclidean, space and so, too, does relativity.

== Monographs and textbooks ==
- A New Perspective on Relativity: An Odyssey in Noneuclidean Spaces: World Scientific (2011)
- A New Perspective on Thermodynamics: Springer, New York (2009) ISBN 978-1-4419-1429-3
- Thermodynamics of Extremes: Horwood (1995)
- Statistical Physics: A Probabilistic Approach (1991), Dover Reprint 2016 ISBN 978-0486810317 (pbk)
- Nonequilibrium statistical thermodynamics - Wiley (1985) ISBN 0-471-90670-0, Dover Reprint 2019 ISBN 978-0486833125 (pbk)
- Thermodynamics of Irreversible Processes - Macmillan Press, London, 1978 ISBN 0-333-21616-4, Dover Reprint in Dover Classics of Science and Mathematics 1993 ISBN 0-486-67576-9 (pbk)
- Russian translation Mir, Moscow, 1999 ISBN 5-03-003211-8
- Introduzione alla Fisica Atomica e Statistica- (E. Santamato coauthor) Liguori Editore, Naples, 1989
- Thermodynamics of Irreversible Processes-Italian translation, Liguori Editore, Naples, 1980 ISBN 978-88-207-0952-5
- Introduction to Atomic Physics and Statistics-In Italian
- Where Physics Went Wrong:World Scientific, Singapore (2015) ISBN 978-9814632928
- Seeing Gravity: (2019) ISBN 978-1092314022
- The Physics of Gravitation: (2021) ISBN 979-8772281628
- Dialogue Concerning Two Chief World Systems: Gravity & Quantum Theory: (2024) ISBN 979-8337636382

== Academic positions ==
- 1980-2014 — Full Professor of Chemical Physics, University of Camerino, Camerino, Italy
- 1997 — Scientific Director of the National Centre for Thermodynamics, ENEA Rome
- 1992–1996 — Scientific Coordinator of the European Thermodynamics Network
- 1993–1996 — Scientific Coordinator of the Eastern European Thermodynamics Network of the European Commission (PECO)
- 1986 — Visiting Professor, Department of Physics Universidade Federal do Rio Grande do Sul (UFRGS), Porto Alegre (RS), Brasil
- 1978–1984 — Scientific Consultant at TEMA (ENI Group)Bologna
- 1975–1980 — Professore Incaricato of Thermodynamics University of Naples, Faculty of Natural Sciences
- 1975–1976 — Professore Incaricato of Electronics, University of Naples, Engineering Faculty
- 1974–1975 — Incarico di Ricerca at the International Institute of Genetics and Biophysics, Naples
- 1972–1973 — Professore Incaricato of Chemical Statistics, University of Pisa, Faculty of Natural Sciences

== Academic history ==
- 1966 — Bachelor of Arts in Chemistry, Clark University, Worcester, Massachusetts, USA
- 1968 — Masters of Science in Physical Chemistry, Weizmann Institute of Science, Rehovot, Israel
- 1970 — Doctor of Philosophy in Chemistry, Chemie-Physique II, Université libre de Bruxelles, Belgium
- 1970–2 Post Doctoral, Department of Physical Chemistry, Hebrew University of Jerusalem

== Awards and prizes ==
- Telesio-Galilei Academy Award 2009 given for his work on irreversible thermodynamics and contributions to many areas of physics, including those of Brownian motion, and in the establishment of the statistical basis of thermodynamics, and his contributions to astrophysics/cosmology.http://www.telesio-galilei.com/tg/index.php/academy-award-2009
