= Beckmann thermometer =

Device for measuring small temperature changes

A Beckmann thermometer; (B) Bend; (R) Reservoir

A Beckmann thermometer is a device used to measure small differences of temperature, but not absolute temperature values. It was invented by Ernst Otto Beckmann (1853 – 1923), a German chemist, for his measurements of colligative properties in 1905. Today its use has largely been superseded by platinum PT100 resistance thermometers and thermocouples.

A Beckmann thermometer's length is usually 40 – 50 cm. The temperature scale typically covers about 5 °C and it is divided into hundredths of a degree. With a magnifier it is possible to estimate temperature changes to one millikelvin (0.001 °C). The peculiarity of Beckmann's thermometer design is a reservoir (R on diagram) at the upper end of the tube, by means of which the quantity of mercury in the bulb can be increased or diminished so that the instrument can be set to measure temperature differences at either high or low temperature values. In contrast, the range of a typical mercury-in-glass thermometer is fixed, being set by the calibration marks etched on the glass or the marks on the printed scale.

== Calibration ==
In setting the thermometer, a sufficient amount of mercury must be left in the bulb and stem to give readings between the required temperatures. First, the thermometer is inverted and gently tapped so that the mercury in the reservoir lodges in the bend (B) at the end of the stem. Next, the bulb is heated until the mercury in the stem joins the mercury in the reservoir. The thermometer is then placed in a bath one or two degrees above the upper limit of temperatures to be measured.

The upper end of the tube is gently tapped with the finger, and the mercury suspended in the upper part of the reservoir will be jarred down, thus separating it from the thread at the bend (B). The thermometer will then be set for readings between the required temperatures.

== See also ==
- Thermometer
