= Vacuum level =

In physics, the vacuum level refers to the energy of a free stationary electron that is outside of any material (it is in a perfect vacuum). It may be taken as infinitely far away from a solid, or, defined to be near a surface. Its definition and measurement are often discussed in ultraviolet photoelectron spectroscopy literature, for example As the vacuum level is a property of the electron and free space, it is often used as the level of alignment for the energy levels of two different materials. The vacuum level alignment approach may or may not hold due to details of the interface. It is particularly important in the design of vacuum device components such as cathodes.

If defined as being close to a surface, then the vacuum level is typically not a constant due to the equilibrium electric fields in vacuum. The value of the vacuum level depends on the surface chosen due to variations in work function.

The phrase "vacuum level" also occurs often in texts on squeezed light where it refers to an unsqueezed measurement. For example, "Thus, when the noise level in the spectrum analyzer shows broadband squeezing below the vacuum level, it also indicates the presence of entanglement between upper and lower sidebands." Note that the phrase "vacuum level" may also refer to a measurement of residual pressure in a vacuum system or a device that uses differential pressure such as a carburetor but this usage should be very clear from context.
