= Biermann battery =

In plasma physics, the Biermann battery is a thermoelectric effect that produces a magnetic field when the electron density and temperature gradients have non-collinear (perpendicular) components, and was first identified by Ludwig Biermann in 1950.

== Physics ==
The Biermann source term may be derived by starting from a single-fluid Ohm’s law that retains the electron pressure term,

$$\mathbf{E} \simeq -\mathbf{v}\times\mathbf{B} - \frac{\nabla P_e}{e\,n_e}$$

Using Faraday’s law,

$$\nabla \times \mathbf{E} = -\,\frac{\partial \mathbf{B}}{\partial t}$$

one obtains the induction equation,

$$\frac{\partial \mathbf{B}}{\partial t}
= \nabla \times (\mathbf{v} \times \mathbf{B})
+ \frac{\nabla T_e \times \nabla n_e}{e\,n_e}$$

where we used $P_e = n_e T_e$. The first term on the right-hand side describes advection of magnetic field by the bulk flow, and the last term is the Biermann battery source term. Physically, the associated currents are driven by pressure-force-induced rotational motion between electrons and ions. Notably, the Biermann term contains no explicit dependence on $\mathbf{B}$, so magnetic fields can be generated from zero initial field provided non-collinear $\nabla T_e$ and $\nabla n_e$ are present.

In astrophysics, the Biermann battery effect is a candidate mechanism for the source of seed fields in protogalactic environments. It is also important in laser-produced plasmas, where perpendicular temperature gradients may arise from laser-imposed temperature profiles. See also cosmological simulations demonstrating Biermann battery field generation in protostellar disks.
