= Barton's pendulums =

Physics experiment demonstrating resonance

A schematic diagram of the Barton's pendulums experiment

First demonstrated by Prof Edwin Henry Barton FRS FRSE (1858–1925), Professor of Physics at University College, Nottingham, who had a particular interest in the movement and behavior of spherical bodies, the Barton's pendulums experiment demonstrates the physical phenomenon of resonance and the response of pendulums to vibration at, below and above their resonant frequencies. In its simplest construction, approximately 10 different pendulums are hung from one common string. This system vibrates at the resonance frequency of a driver pendulum, causing the target pendulum to swing with the maximum amplitude. The other pendulums to the side do not move as well, thus demonstrating how torquing a pendulum at its resonance frequency is most efficient.

The driver may be a very heavy pendulum also attached to this common string; the driver is set to swing and move the whole system.
