= Peter Bradshaw (aeronautical engineer) =

British engineer (1935–2024)

Peter Bradshaw FRS (26 December 1935 – 27 July 2024) was an aeronautical engineer specialising in fluid mechanics.

He was educated at Torquay Grammar School and Cambridge University, where he was awarded a B.A. in Aeronautical Engineering in 1957.

== Career ==
He worked at the National Physical Laboratory in the Aerodynamics Division until 1969. Following this he was Professor of Experimental Aerodynamics at the Department of Aeronautics, Imperial College, London University until 1988.

He was then appointed to the Thomas V. Jones Chair of Engineering at Stanford University, retiring as Emeritus Professor in 1995.

He is the author or co-author of a number of textbooks on fluid dynamics. Bradshaw died on 27 July 2024, at the age of 88.

== Works ==
- Experimental Fluid Mechanics, (Pergamon, Oxford 1964, 1970)
- An Introduction to Turbulence and Its Measurement, (Pergamon, Oxford 1971, 1975)
- Momentum Transfer in Boundary Layers, (with T. Cebeci; Hemisphere, New York 1977)
- Engineering Calculation Methods for Turbulent Flows, (with T. Cebeci and J.H. Whitelaw; Academic Press, London 1981, 1985)
- Physical and Computational Aspects of Convective Heat Transfer, (with T. Cebeci;Springer, New York 1984, 1988)

== Honours and awards ==
- 1971 Bronze Medal of the Royal Aeronautical Society
- 1981 Fellow of the Royal Society
- 1990 Hon. D.Sc., Exeter University
- 1994 American Institute of Aeronautics and Astronautics (AIAA) Fluid Dynamics Award
