= Beta function (disambiguation) =

The beta function, also called the Euler beta function or the Euler integral of the first kind, is a special function in mathematics.

== Other meanings ==
Beta function may also refer to:

- Beta function (physics), details the running of the coupling strengths
- Dirichlet beta function, closely related to the Riemann zeta function
- Gödel's β function, used in mathematical logic to encode sequences of natural numbers
- Beta function (accelerator physics), related to the transverse beam size at a given point in a beam transport system

== See also ==
- Beta distribution
