= Bosenova =

Explosion in Bose-Einstein condensates

A bosenova or bose supernova is a very small, supernova-like explosion, which can be induced in a Bose–Einstein condensate (BEC) by changing the external magnetic field, so that the "self-scattering" interaction transitions from repulsive to attractive due to the Feshbach resonance, causing the BEC to "collapse and bounce" or "rebound."

Although the total energy of the explosion is very small, the "collapse and bounce" scenario qualitatively resembles a condensed matter version of a core-collapse supernova, hence the term bosenova. The nomenclature is not a play of words on the Brazilian music style bossa nova, but a play of words with bose-einstein and supernova.

== Experiment ==
In the particular experiment when a bosenova was first detected, transitioning the self-interaction from repulsive to attractive caused the BEC to implode and shrink to a size smaller than the optical detector's minimum resolution limit, and then suddenly "explode." In this explosion, about half of the atoms in the condensate superficially seemed to have "disappeared" from the experiment altogether, i.e., they were not detected in either the cold particle remnants nor in the expanding gas cloud produced.

The 'missing' atoms are almost certainly still around in some form, but just not in a form that we can detect them in our current experiment, the two likely possibilities are that they have formed into molecules of two rubidium atoms stuck together. or they have gotten enough energy from somewhere to fly away fast enough that they are out of our observation region before we look for them,"

— Carl Wieman, Space.com

Under current BEC theory, which only very crudely accounts for the interactions between the particles composing the BEC, the bosenova phenomenon remains unexplained, because the energy available to the individual atoms of the condensate near absolute zero appears to be insufficient to cause the observed implosion. However, subsequent mean-field theories have been proposed to explain bosenovas as a collective phenomenon.

The bosenova behaviour of a BEC may provide insights into the behavior of a neutron star, as well as into the possible properties of still-hypothetical boson stars and into the quantum theory of "collective phenomena" in general.
