= Beard and Chuang model =

The Beard and Chuang model is a well known and leading theoretical force balance model used to derive the rotational cross-sections of raindrops in their equilibrium state by employing Chebyshev polynomials in series.

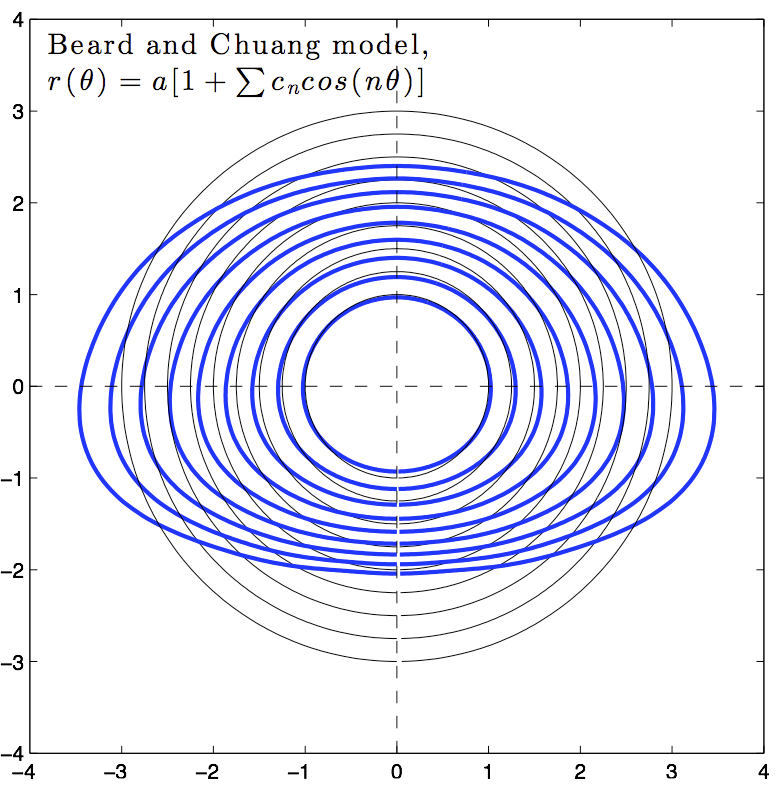
Beard and Chuang model of raindrop

The radius-vector of the raindrop's surface $r(\theta)$ in vertical angular direction $\theta$ is equal to

$r(\theta)=a [ 1 + \sum c_n cos(n \theta) ]$,

where shape coefficients $c_n \cdot 10^4$ are defined for the raindrops with different equivolumetric diameter as in following table

d(mm)	n = 0	1	2	3	4	5	6	7	8	9	10
2.0	-131	-120	-376	-96	-4	15	5	0	-2	0	1
2.5	-201	-172	-567	-137	3	29	8	-2	-4	0	1
3.0	-282	-230	-779	-175	21	46	11	-6	-7	0	3
3.5	-369	-285	-998	-207	48	68	13	-13	-10	0	5
4.0	-458	-335	-1211	-227	83	89	12	-21	-13	1	8
4.5	-549	-377	-1421	-240	126	110	9	-31	-16	4	11
5.0	-644	-416	-1629	-246	176	131	2	-44	-18	9	14
5.5	-742	-454	-1837	-244	234	150	-7	-58	-19	15	19
6.0	-840	-480	-2034	-237	297	166	-21	-72	-19	24	23

== Applications ==
The description of raindrop shape has some rather practical uses. Understanding rain is particularly important with regard to the propagation of electromagnetic signals. A portion of atmosphere that has rain in it, or a rain cell, has the characteristic of attenuating and de-polarizing EM signals that pass through it. The attenuation of such a signal is approximately proportional to the square of the frequency of the signal, and the de-polarization is proportional to the shape distribution of raindrops in the rain cell.
