= Bimoment =

Bimoment (a.k.a. warping moment) is a term used in the analysis of beams (continuum mechanics) that relates to torsion and warping. Its symbol is Mω.

Bimoment show the distributions at a cross-section of (longitudinal) warping stress in cases of torsional warping and distortional warping, respectively. Generally, a bimoment can be represented by a pair of equal and opposite bending moments.
