= Ballistic galvanometer =

Galvanometer

A ballistic galvanometer is a type of sensitive galvanometer; commonly a mirror galvanometer. Unlike a current-measuring galvanometer, the moving part has a large moment of inertia, thus giving it a long oscillation period. It is really an integrator measuring the quantity of charge discharged through it. It can be either of the moving coil or moving magnet type.

Ballistic galvanometer calibration setup.

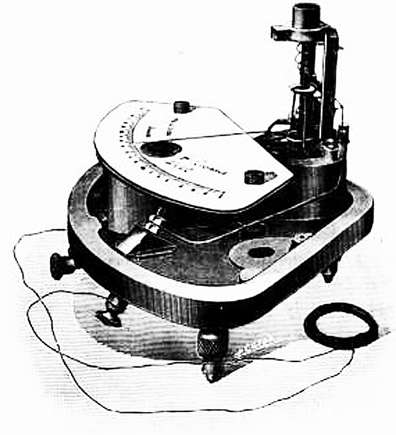
Grassot fluxmeter, a form of ballistic galvanometer.

Grassot fluxmeter calibration arrangement using a standard mutual inductor and a known quantity of electrical discharge. Measuring setup is similar.

Before first use the ballistic constant of the galvanometer must be determined. This is usually done by connecting to the galvanometer a known capacitor, charged to a known voltage, and recording the deflection. The constant K is calculated from the capacitance C, the voltage V and the deflection d: $K=CV/d$

where K is expressed in coulombs per centimeter.

In operation the unknown quantity of charge Q (in coulombs) is simply: $Q=kd$.

== Grassot Fluxmeter ==
The Grassot Fluxmeter solves a particular problem encountered with regular galvanometers. For a regular galvanometer, the discharge time must be shorter than the natural period of oscillation of the mechanism. In some applications, particularly those involving inductors, this condition cannot be met. The Grassot fluxmeter resolves this problem, by operating without any restoring force, making the oscillation period effectively infinite and thereby longer than any discharge time.

Its construction is similar to that of a ballistic galvanometer, but its coil is suspended without any restoring forces in the suspension thread or in the current leads. The core (bobbin) of the coil is of a non-conductive material. When an electric charge is connected to the instrument, the coil starts moving in the magnetic field of the galvanometer's magnet, generating an opposing electromotive force and coming to a stop regardless of the time of the current flow. The change in the coil position is proportional only to the quantity of charge. The coil is returned to the zero position manually or by reversing the direction of the current.
