= Bell mouth =

HVAC feature

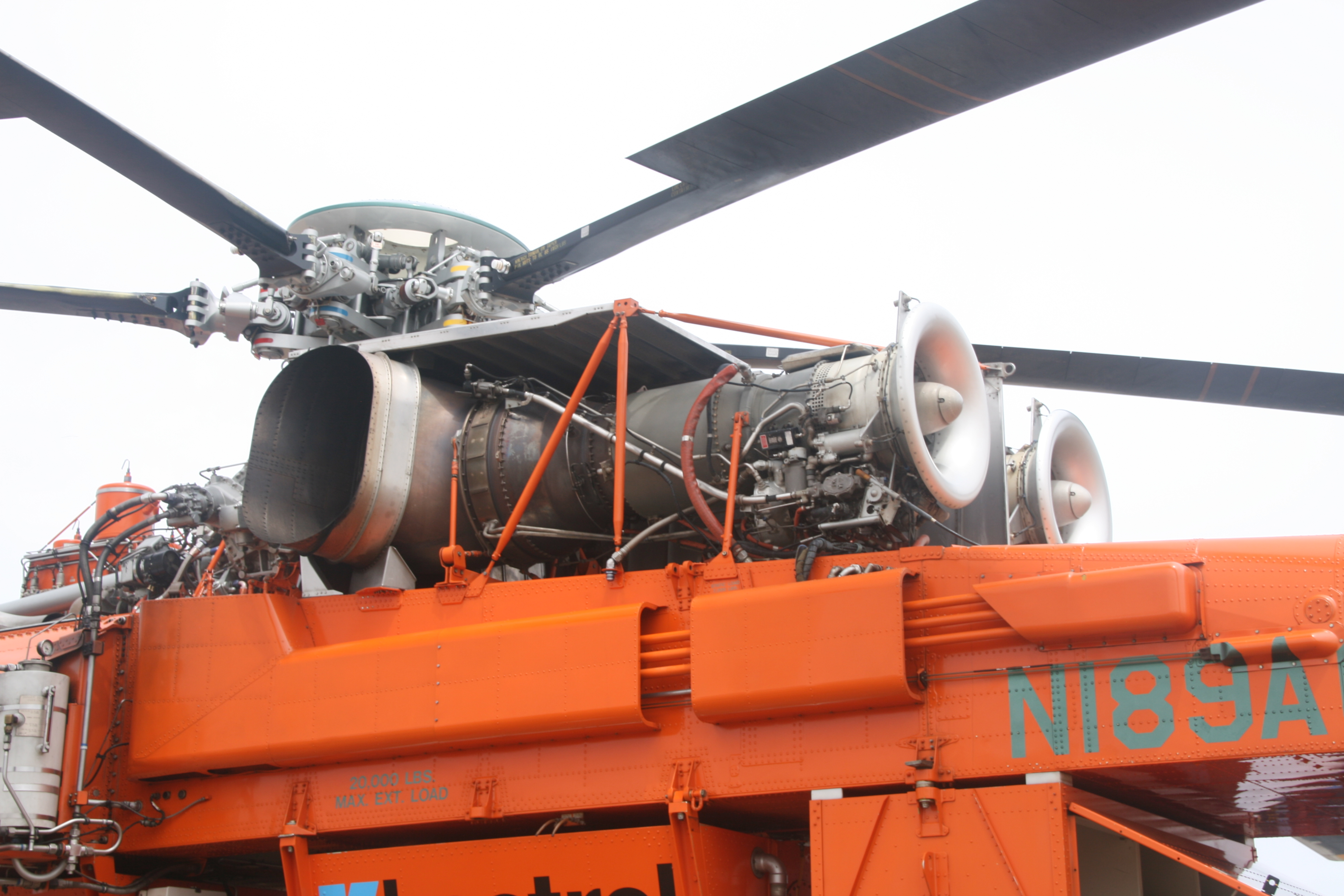
Inlet bellmouths (right) on the two turboshaft engines of a heavy-lift helicopter

In building services engineering and HVAC, a bell mouth is a tapered expanding or reducing opening in the end of a ventilation duct, so named because the taper can resemble that of a bell shape. They are primarily designed and used for return air or extract air purposes within building ventilation systems, more commonly located within ceiling voids or other similar plenum. The bellmouth cross-sectional area is normally double that of the duct area so that the air velocity entering the bellmouth is low (to reduce noise, turbulence and pressure drop), and gradually increases to the normal design velocity of the ductwork. The angle of the bellmouth is normally tapered at about 45° as a balance between keeping the bellmouth short without causing too much turbulence or excessive pressure drop. Bellmouths can be manufactured to suit either circular or rectangular ductwork sections.

The bell-mouth shape allows the maximum amount of air to be drawn into the duct with minimum loss.

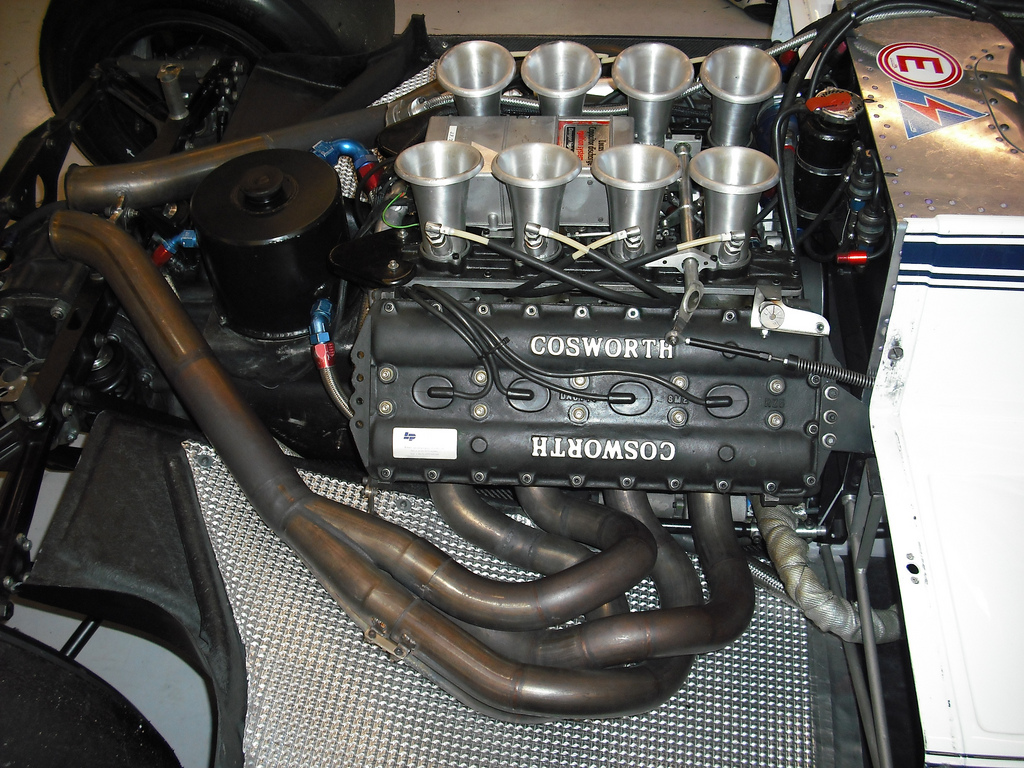
Cosworth Formula One engine, with bell-mouthed inlet trumpets for each cylinder, known as a velocity stack

A bell-mouth inlet duct is a form of convergent inlet air duct used to direct air into the inlet of a gas turbine engine. The area of a convergent duct gets smaller as the air flows into the engine. A bell-mouth inlet duct is extremely efficient and is used where there is little ram pressure available to force the air into the engine. Bell-mouth ducts are used in engine test cells and on engines installed in helicopters.

== See also ==
- Vena contracta
