= Sehar Broadcasting Network =

- Country: Pakistan
- Broadcast area: South Asia, Middle East

Programming
- Language(s): Urdu
- Picture format: 4:3 (576i, SDTV)

Sehar Broadcasting Network (GTV) is a Pakistan-based Urdu infotainment channel.

== See also ==
- Media of Pakistan
