= Bernard Picinbono =

French scientist (born 1933)

Bernard Picinbono is a French scientist born in 1933 in Algiers. His scientific work focuses on statistics and its applications in optics, electronics, signal processing and automation.

== Biography ==
He did his secondary and higher education in Algiers and then in Paris where he obtained the agrégation de sciences physiques.

He was associate professor of physical sciences at the Algiers high school from 1956 to 1960 and then, after obtaining a doctorate in science, lecturer at the Faculty of Science in Algiers from 1960 to 1965. He was then appointed professor at the Orsay Faculty of Sciences. He was President of the University of Paris XI (now Paris-Saclay University) from 1970 to 1975, President of SupOptique (Institute of Theoretical and Applied Optics) from 1980 to 1990, and Director General of Supélec from 1990 to 1995. In the early 1980s, he was director of the master (DEA) in Automation and Signal Processing at the University of Paris XI and lectures at Supélec's signals and systems laboratory.

He is professor emeritus at the Paris-Saclay University and at CentraleSupélec.

Bernard Picinbono was President of Cimade from 1970 to 1983 and again from 1997 to 2002.

== Awards ==
- Member of the French Academy of sciences, elected correspondent in 1983.
- Member of the French Academy of technologies.
- Recipient in 1970 of the Blondel Medal awarded by the Electricity, Electronics and Information and Communication Technologies Society
- Fellow of the IEEE for contributions to signal processing, adaptive detection and stochastic processes.
- Officier of the Légion d'Honneur (July 2009)
- Officier of the Ordre du Mérite
- Commandeur des Palmes académiques (2008)

== Publications ==
- B. Picinbono. On Instantaneous Amplitude and Phase of Signals. IEEE Trans. Signal Process., 45:552-560, 1997. [bibtex-entry]
- B. Picinbono and W. Martin. Représentation des signaux par amplitude et phase instantanées. Annales des Télécommunications, 38:179-190, 1983. [bibtex-entry]
