= Bi-hemispherical reflectance =

Bi-hemispherical reflectance is the reflectance of a surface under diffuse illumination (with no direct component). Bi-hemispherical reflectance is an important part of the Bidirectional reflectance distribution function over all viewing and illumination directions of a hemisphere. It is sometimes called "white-sky albedo".

== See also ==
- Directional-hemispherical reflectance
