= Benny Lautrup =

Danish physicist (1939–2025)

Benny Lautrup (25 June 1939 – 3 January 2025) was a Danish academic who was a professor in theoretical physics at the Niels Bohr Institute at the University of Copenhagen. During his career he has worked at the Nordic Institute for Theoretical Physics (Denmark), Brookhaven National Laboratory (USA), CERN (Switzerland), and the Institut des Hautes Études Scientifiques (France). He is known for his part in the Nakanishi-Lautrup formalism, a concept in relativistic quantum field theory. He has published the books Neural Networks – Computers with Intuition with Søren Brunak (original in Danish) and also translated into German), and Physics of Continuous Matter: Exotic and Everyday Phenomena in the macroscopic World in 2005. A second edition of this book was published in 2011. He also wrote articles about physics and participated in the public debate in Denmark (list of articles).

Lautrup participated in the documentary The Anatomy of Thought (Danish: Tankens Anatomi) from 1997. He died on 3 January 2025, at the age of 85.
