= Baldwin–Lomax model =

The Baldwin–Lomax model is a 0-equation turbulence model used in computational fluid dynamics analysis of turbulent boundary layer flows.
