= Strontium barium niobate =

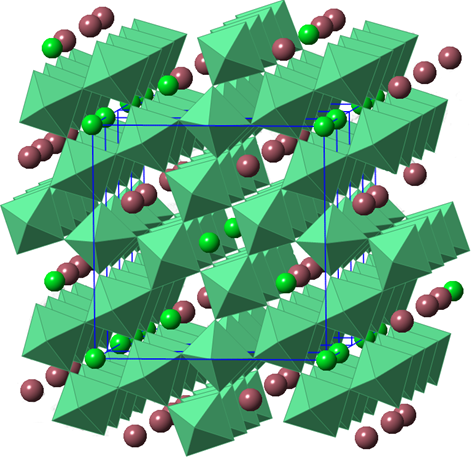

Identifiers
CAS Number	x=0.5: 37185-09-4
3D model (JSmol)	x=0.5: Interactive image
EC Number	x=0.5: 253-383-3
PubChem CID	x=0.5: 21862943
CompTox Dashboard (EPA)	x=0.5: DTXSID70190669
- InChI: InChI=1S/Ba.4Nb.12O.Sr/q+2;;;;;;;;;;;;;4*-1;+2 Key: DKDQMLPMKQLBHQ-UHFFFAOYSA-N
- SMILES: x=0.5: [O-][Nb](=O)=O.[O-][Nb](=O)=O.[O-][Nb](=O)=O.[O-][Nb](=O)=O.[Sr+2].[Ba+2]

Properties
Chemical formula	(Sr_{x},Ba_{1−x})Nb_{2}O_{6} for 0.32≤x≤0.82
Density	5.24-5.39 g/cm^{3}
Melting point	1,427–1,480 °C (2,601–2,696 °F; 1,700–1,753 K)

Hazards
- GHS labelling
Pictograms	(GHS07: Exclamation mark)
Signal word	Warning
Hazard statements	H302, H332
Precautionary statements	P261, P264, P270, P271, P301+P312, P304+P312, P304+P340, P312, P330, P501

Structure
Crystal structure	Tetragonal
Space group	P4bm
Point group	4mm
- Except where otherwise noted, data are given for materials in their standard state (at 25 °C [77 °F], 100 kPa). Infobox references

Strontium barium niobate is the chemical compound Sr_{x}Ba_{1−x}Nb_{2}O_{6} for 0.32≤x≤0.82.

Strontium barium niobate is a ferroelectric material commonly used in single crystal form in electro-optics, acousto-optics, and photorefractive non-linear optics for its photorefractive properties.

Strontium barium niobate is one of the few tetragonal tungsten bronze compounds without volatile elements making it a useful system for probing structure-property relations. Strontium barium niobate is a normal ferroelectric for Barium-rich compositions and becomes a relaxor ferroelectric with increasing strontium content. This has been attributed to positional disorder of the A-site cations alongside incommensurate oxygen octahedral tilting.

Strontium barium niobate is one of numerous ceramic materials that are known to exhibit abnormal grain growth, in which certain grains grow very large within a matrix of finer equiaxed grains. This abnormal grain growth (AGG) has significant consequences on the dielectric and electronic performance of strontium barium niobate.
