= Physics outreach =

Broadening awareness and understanding of physics

Physics outreach encompasses facets of science outreach and physics education, and a variety of activities by schools, research institutes, universities, clubs and institutions such as science museums aimed at broadening the audience for and awareness and understanding of physics, including through trust-building with non-expert audiences. While the general public may sometimes be the focus of such activities, physics outreach often centers on developing and providing resources and making presentations to students, educators in other disciplines, and in some cases researchers within different areas of physics.

== History ==
Ongoing efforts to expand the understanding of physics to a wider audience have been undertaken by individuals and institutions since the early 19th century. Historic works, such as the Dialogue Concerning the Two Chief World Systems, and Two New Sciences by Galileo Galilei, sought to present revolutionary knowledge in astronomy, frames of reference, and kinematics in a manner that a general audience could understand with great effect.

In the mid-1800s, English physicist and chemist, Michael Faraday gave a series of nineteen lectures aimed towards young adults with the hopes of conveying scientific phenomena. His intentions were to raise awareness, inspire them and generate revenue of the Royal Institution. This series became known as the Christmas lectures, and still continues today. By the early 20th century, the public notoriety of physicists such as Albert Einstein and Marie Curie, and inventions such as radio led to a growing interest in physics. In 1921, in the United States, the establishment of Sigma Pi Sigma physics honor society at universities was instrumental in the expanding number of physics presentations, and led to the creation of physics clubs open to all students.

Museums were an important form of outreach but most early science museums were generally focused on natural history. Some specialized museums, such as the Cavendish Museum at University of Cambridge, housed many of the historically important pieces of apparatus that contributed to the major discoveries by Maxwell, Thomson, Rutherford, etc. However, such venues provided little opportunity for hands-on learning or demonstrations.

In August 1969, Frank Oppenheimer dedicated his new Exploratorium in San Francisco primarily to interactive science exhibits that demonstrated principles in physics. The Exploratorium published the details of their own exhibits in "Cookbooks" that served as an inspiration to many other museums around the world, and since then has diversified into many outreach programs. Oppenheimer had researched European science museums while on a Guggenheim Fellowship in 1965. He noted that three museums served as important influences on the Exploratorium: the Palais de la Découverte, which displayed models to teach scientific concepts and employed students as demonstrators, a practice that directly inspired the Exploratorium's much-lauded High School Explainer Program; the South Kensington Museum of Science and Art, which Oppenheimer and his wife visited frequently; and the Deutsches Museum in Munich, the world's largest science museum, which had a number of interactive displays that impressed the Oppenheimers.

In the ensuing years, physics outreach, and science outreach more generally, continued to expand and took on new popular forms, including highly successful television shows such as Cosmos: A Personal Voyage, first broadcast in 1980.

As a form of outreach within the physics education community for teachers and students, in 1997 the US National Science Foundation (NSF) and Department of Energy USDOE established QuarkNet, a professional teacher development program. In 2012, the University of Notre Dame received a $6.1M, five-year grant to support a nationwide expansion of the Quarknet program. Also in 1997, the European Particle Physics Outreach Group, led by Christopher Llewellyn Smith, FRS, and Director General of CERN, was formed to create a community of scientists, science educators, and communication specialists in science education and public outreach for particle physics. This group became the International Particle Physics Outreach Group (IPPOG) in 2011 after the start up of the LHC.

== Innovation ==
Many contemporary initiatives in physics outreach have begun to shift focus, transcending traditional field boundaries, seeking to engage students and the public by integrating elements of aesthetic design and popular culture. The goal has been not only to push physics out of a strictly science education framework but also to draw in professionals and students from other fields to bring their perspectives on physical phenomena. Such work includes artists creating sculptures using ferrofluids, and art photography using high speed and ultra high speed photography.

Other efforts, such as University of Cambridge's Physics at Work program have created annual events to demonstrate to secondary students uses of physics in everyday life and a Senior Physics Challenge. Seeing the importance these initiatives, Cambridge has established a full-time physics outreach organization, an Educational Outreach Office, and aspirations for a Center of Physics and expanded industrial partnerships that "would include a well equipped core team of outreach officers dedicated to demonstrating the real life applications of physics, showing that physics is an accessible and relevant subject".

The French research group, La Physique Autrement (Physics Reimagined), of the Laboratoire de Physique des Solides, works on research about new ways to present modern solid-state physics and to engage the general public. In 2013, Physics Today covered this group in an article entitled "Quantum Physics For Everyone" which discussed how with the help of designers and unconventional demonstrations, the project sought out and succeeded to engage people who never thought of themselves as interested in science.

The Science & Entertainment Exchange was developed by the United States National Academy of Sciences (NAS) to increase public awareness, knowledge, and understanding of science and advanced science technology through its representation in television, film, and other media. It was officially launched in 2008 as a partnership between the NAS and Hollywood. The Exchanged is Based in Los Angeles, California.

== Museums and public venues primarily focused on physical phenomena ==
=== Canada ===
- Montreal Science Centre (Montreal, Quebec) displays many hands-on activities involving various physics phenomena.

=== Finland ===
- Heureka (Helsinki) is an NPO science center run by the Finnish Science Centre Foundation with a broad spectrum of physics-related exhibits.

=== France ===
- Cité des Sciences et de l'Industrie (Paris) is the largest French science museum, and contains permanent exhibits and hands-on experiments.
- Palais de la Découverte (Paris) contains permanent exhibits and interactive experiments with commentaries by lecturers. It includes a Zeiss planetarium with 15-metre dome. It was created in 1937 by the French Nobel Prize physicist Jean Baptiste Perrin.
- Musée des Arts et Métiers (Paris) focuses on the preservation of scientific instruments and inventions.
- Other science museums that are part of the Cultural Center of Science, Technology and Industry (CCSTI) exist all across France : Espace des Sciences (Rennes), La Casemate (Grenoble), the Cité de l'espace (Toulouse).

=== Germany ===
- Deutsches Museum (Munich) is the world's largest science museum. One of the most popular events is the high voltage demonstration of a Faraday cage as part of their series on electric power.

=== Islamic Republic of Iran ===
- Iran Science and Technology Museum (Tehran) is the largest science museum in Iran. This museum, by holding varied scientific and educational programs, provides the required situation for creation and propagation of scientific thought in the society. One of these programs is the "Physics Show".

=== Netherlands ===
- NEMO (Amsterdam) is the largest science center in the Netherlands, with hands-on science exhibitions.

=== United States ===
- Exploratorium (San Francisco) is one of the foremost interactive science and art museums in the United States dedicated to exploring how the world works and consists of interactive exhibits, experiences and curious exploration. The Exploratorium was opened in 1969, and now attracts over a million visitors annually.
- The American Museum of Natural History in New York City is both a museum and a research facility with a department in astrophysics. As a natural history museum, it focuses on educating the public about human cultures, the natural world, and the universe, and has many interactive programs and lectures all year round.
- The Franklin Institute in Philadelphia is one of the oldest centers for science education and research in the United States.

== Scientific institutions and societies with physics outreach programs ==
=== Canada ===
- Perimeter Institute for Theoretical Physics was founded in 1999 in Waterloo, Ontario, Canada, the institute is a center for scientific research, training and educational outreach in theoretical physics.
- Located in Vancouver, British Columbia, TRIUMF is Canada's national laboratory for particle and nuclear physics and accelerator-based science. In addition to its science mission, the laboratory is committed to physics outreach, offering public tours of its facilities, public talks, an artist in residence program, student fellowships, and other opportunities.
- The Canadian Association of Physicists (CAP), or in French Association canadienne des physiciens et physiciennes (ACP) is a Canadian professional society that focuses on creating awareness amongst Canadians and Canadian legislators of physics issues, sponsoring physics related events, [physics outreach], and publishes Physics in Canada.

=== France ===
- French Physics Society has a specific section devoted to outreach and popularization of science.
- The European Physical Society (EPS) is based in France, but works to promote physics and physicists in Europe.

=== Germany ===
- Deutsche Physikalische Gesellschaft (DPG, German Physical Society) is the world's largest organization of physicists. The DPG actively participates in communication between physics and the general public with several popular scientific publications and events such as the "Highlights of Physics" which is an annual physics festival organized jointly by the DPG and the Federal Ministry of Education and Research. This festival is the largest of its kind in Germany and attracts about 30,000 visitors every year.

=== United Kingdom ===
- Institute of Physics is an international charitable institution that aims to advance physics education, research and application.

=== United States ===
- American Association for the Advancement of Science
- American Association of Physics Teachers
- American Institute of Physics (AIP) has an outreach program focused on advocating science policy to the US Congress and the general public.
- American Physical Society (APS) has a program dedicated to "Communicating the excitement and importance of physics to everyone."
- Leonardo, the International Society for the Arts, Sciences and Technology (Leonardo/ISAST) is a nonprofit organization that serves the global network of distinguished scholars, artists, scientists, researchers and thinkers. The institution focuses on interdisciplinary work, creative output and innovation. Its journal Leonardo is published by MIT Press.

== Media and Internet ==
=== Media ===
- The Big Bang Theory is an American sitcom created in 2007 and revolves around the lives of scientists at the California Institute of Technology. This show has been widely recognized for popularizing science and noted by the New York Times as "helping physics and fiction collide". In 2014, the program was the most popular sitcom and most popular non-sports program on American TV with an average of 20 million viewers. However, the show has been criticized for sometimes portraying the scientific community inaccurately.
- C'est pas sorcier is a French educational television program that originally aired from November 5, 1994, to present. 20 shows dealt with astronomy and space topics and 13 about physics.
- Particle Fever is a 2013 documentary film that provides an intimate and accessible view of the first experiments at the Large Hadron Collider from the perspectives of the experimental physicists at CERN who run the experiments, as well as the theoretical physicists who attempt to provide a conceptual framework for the LHC's results. Reviewers praised the film for making theoretical arguments seem comprehensible, for making scientific experiments seem thrilling, and for making particle physicists seem human.
- Through the Wormhole is an American science documentary television series narrated and hosted by American actor Morgan Freeman and has featured physicists such as such as Michio Kaku and Brian Cox (physicist).

=== Internet ===
- MinutePhysics is a series of educational videos created by Henry Reich and disseminated through its YouTube channel. It displays a series of pedagogical short videos about various physics phenomena and theories.
- Physics World publication, run by the Institute of Physics, started explaining scientific concepts through its YouTube channel.
- Palais de la Découverte in Paris hosts online videos that display various interviews about science, including physics.
- Unisciel, a French online university, hosts educational videos through its YouTube channel.
- Veritasium is a series of educational videos created by Derek Muller and disseminated through its YouTube channel. It displays a series of pedagogical short videos about science, including physics.
- Saint Mary's Physics Demonstrations is an online repository for physics classroom demonstrations. It shows teachers the experiments they can do in class while also hosting videos of said experiments.
- Periodic Videos is a portal of educational videos explaining the characteristics of each element and supporting topics such as nuclear reactions. The project is sponsored by the University of Nottingham and hosted by Prof. Sir Martyn Poliakoff.

== Prominent individuals ==
=== Austria ===
- Fritjof Capra is an Austrian-born American physicist, who attended the University of Vienna, where he earned his Ph.D. in theoretical physics in 1966. He is a founding director of the Center for Ecoliteracy in Berkeley, California, and is on the faculty of Schumacher College. Capra is the author of several books, including The Tao of Physics (1975) and has also done research in Paris and London.

=== France ===
- Camille Flammarion was a French astronomer author of many popular science books.
- Étienne Klein is a French physicist and philosopher of science involved in outreach efforts about particle and quantum physics.
- Roland Lehoucq is a French astrophysicist known for his outreach efforts especially in relationship with fiction and science fiction.
- Hubert Reeves is a French Canadian astrophysicist and popularizer of science.

=== United Kingdom ===
- Brian Cox is a British physicist and musician best known to the public as the presenter of a number of science programs for the BBC.
- Wendy J. Sadler promotes science and engineering as part of popular culture through Science Made Simple, an educational spin-off company of Cardiff University that reaches students through live presentations. She also trains scientists and engineers to improve their communications skills to enable them to extend their research across a broader audience. Sadler was the IoP Young Professional Physicist of the Year in 2005.
- Robert Matthews is a Fellow of the Royal Statistical Society, a Chartered Physicist, a Member of the Institute of Physics, and a Fellow of the Royal Astronomical Society. Matthews is a distinguished science journalist. He is currently anchorman for the science magazine BBC Focus, and a freelance columnist for the Financial Times. In the past, he has been science correspondent for the Sunday Telegraph.

=== United States ===
- Richard Feynman was a Nobel-prize-winning theoretical physicist also known as a science popularizer through his books and lectures ranging from physics topics (quantum physics, nanophysics...) to autobiographical essays.
- George Gamow was a theoretical physicist and cosmologist who also wrote popular books on science, some of which are still in print more than a half-century after their original publication
- Brian Greene is a theoretical physicist involved in various outreach activities (books, TV shows). He co-founded the World Science Festival in 2008.
- Clifford Victor Johnson is a theoretical physicist involved in various outreach activities (blog, TV shows...).
- Michio Kaku is a theoretical physicist who is a futurist and communicator and popularizer of physics. He is most well known for his three New York Times Best Sellers on physics: Physics of the Impossible (2008), Physics of the Future (2011), and The Future of the Mind (2014).
- Lawrence M. Krauss is an American theoretical physicist and cosmologist who is Foundation Professor of the School of Earth and Space Exploration at Arizona State University and is known as an advocate of the public understanding of science, of public policy based on sound empirical data, of scientific skepticism and of science education and works to reduce the impact of superstition and religious dogma in pop culture.
- Don Lincoln is a physicist at Fermi National Accelerator Laboratory. While his research focuses on the Large Hadron Collider, he is known for his efforts to spread public awareness of physics and cosmology. He is the face of the Fermilab YouTube channel, where he has made over 150 videos. He is also a frequent contributor to CNN, Forbes, and many other online journals. He is also author of several books, including "Understanding the Universe", published by World Scientific, and "The Large Hadron Collider: The Extraordinary Story of the Higgs Boson and Other Things That Will Blow Your Mind," published by Johns Hopkins University Press.
- Jennifer Ouellette is the former director of the Science & Entertainment Exchange, an initiative of the National Academy of Sciences (NAS) designed to connect entertainment industry professionals with top scientists and engineers to help the creators of television shows, films, video games, and other productions incorporate science into their work. She is currently a freelance writer contributing to a physics outreach dialogue with articles in a variety of publications such as Physics World, Discover magazine, New Scientist, Physics Today, and The Wall Street Journal.
- Carl Sagan was an astrophysicist and science popularizer, one of his important contributions being the 1980 television series Cosmos: A Personal Voyage
- Neil deGrasse Tyson is an astrophysicist and science communicator who participated to TV and radio shows and wrote various outreach books.
- Jearl Walker is a physics professor at Cleveland State University. He wrote the Amateur Scientist column in Scientific American from 1978 to 1988 and authored the popular science book The Flying Circus of Physics.

== Funding sources ==
- American Physical Society awards grants up to $10,000 to help APS members develop new physics outreach activities.
- Institute for Complex Adaptive Matter (ICAM) provides grants and fellowships for physics outreach.
- Wellcome Trust, while mostly focused on biological sciences, the Wellcome Trust also touches on physics and encourages physics outreach. They aim to improve biology, chemistry, and physics A levels in the UK.
- Institute of Physics (IoP) The IoP aims to provide positive and compelling experiences of physics for public audiences through engaging and entertaining activities and events. The public engagement grant scheme is designed to give financial support of up to £1500 to individuals and organisations running physics-based events and activities in the UK and Ireland.

== Awards ==
- Kalinga Prize for the Popularization of Science is an award given by UNESCO for exceptional skill in presenting scientific ideas to lay people
- Klopsteg Memorial Award is presented by the American Association of Physics Teachers and given in memory of the physicist Paul E. Klopsteg
- Kelvin Prize is awarded by the Institute of Physics to acknowledge outstanding contributions to the public understanding of physics.
- The Michael Faraday Prize for communicating science to a UK audience is awarded by the Royal Society.
- Prix Jean Perrin for popularization in physics is attributed by the French Physics Society.
