= The God Equation =

2021 book by Michio Kaku

The God Equation: The Quest for a Theory of Everything
- Hardcover edition (US)
- Author: Michio Kaku
- Language: English
- Genre: Popular science
- Publisher: Doubleday (US); Allen Lane (UK)
- Publication date: April 6, 2021
- Publication place: United States
- Media type: Print (Hardcover)
- Pages: 240
- ISBN: 978-0385542746
- Preceded by: The Future of Humanity
- Followed by: Quantum Supremacy

The God Equation: The Quest for a Theory of Everything is a popular science book by the futurist and physicist Michio Kaku. The book was initially published on April 6, 2021, by Doubleday.

The book debuted at number six on The New York Times nonfiction best-seller list for the week ending April 10, 2021.

== Overview ==
Kaku explores the history of unification theories of physics starting with Newton's law of universal gravitation which unified our experience of gravity on Earth and the motions of the celestial bodies to Einstein's general relativity and quantum mechanics and the Standard Model. He dubs the final Grand Unified Theory and quantum gravity The God Equation with an 11-dimensional string theory as the only self-consistent theory that seems to fit the bill.
