= Einstein's Cosmos =

2004 book by Michio Kaku

- Author: Michio Kaku
- Language: English
- Subject: Physics
- Genre: Popular science
- Publisher: W. W. Norton & Company
- Publication date: 2004
- Publication place: United States
- ISBN: 978-0393327007
- Preceded by: Visions (book)
- Followed by: Parallel Worlds (book)

Einstein's Cosmos: How Albert Einstein's Vision Transformed Our Understanding of Space and Time is a popular science book by Michio Kaku first published in 2004. In the book Kaku discusses Albert Einstein's work, life and concepts such as E=mc² as well as special relativity.
