= String field theory =

Formalism in string theory

String field theory (SFT) is a formalism in string theory in which the dynamics of relativistic strings is reformulated in the language of quantum field theory. This is accomplished at the level of perturbation theory by finding a collection of vertices for joining and splitting strings, as well as string propagators, that give a Feynman diagram-like expansion for string scattering amplitudes. In most string field theories, this expansion is encoded by a classical action found by second-quantizing the free string and adding interaction terms. As is usually the case in second quantization, a classical field configuration of the second-quantized theory is given by a wave function in the original theory. In the case of string field theory, this implies that a classical configuration, usually called the string field, is given by an element of the free string Fock space.

The principal advantages of the formalism are that it allows the computation of off-shell amplitudes and, when a classical action is available, gives non-perturbative information that cannot be seen directly from the standard genus expansion of string scattering. In particular, following the work of Ashoke Sen, it has been useful in the study of tachyon condensation on unstable D-branes. It has also had applications to topological string theory, non-commutative geometry, and strings in low dimensions.

String field theories come in a number of varieties depending on which type of string is second quantized: Open string field theories describe the scattering of open strings, closed string field theories describe closed strings, while open-closed string field theories include both open and closed strings.

In addition, depending on the method used to fix the worldsheet diffeomorphisms and conformal transformations in the original free string theory, the resulting string field theories can be very different. Using light cone gauge, yields light-cone string field theories whereas using BRST quantization, one finds covariant string field theories. There are also hybrid string field theories, known as covariantized light-cone string field theories which use elements of both light-cone and BRST gauge-fixed string field theories.

A final form of string field theory, known as background independent open string field theory, takes a very different form; instead of second quantizing the worldsheet string theory, it second quantizes the space of two-dimensional quantum field theories.

== Light-cone string field theory ==
Light-cone string field theories were introduced by Stanley Mandelstam and developed by Mandelstam, Michael Green, John Schwarz and Lars Brink. An explicit description of the second-quantization of the light-cone string was given by Michio Kaku and Keiji Kikkawa.

Light-cone string field theories were the first string field theories to be constructed and are based on the simplicity of string scattering in light-cone gauge. For example, in the bosonic closed string case, the worldsheet scattering diagrams naturally take a Feynman diagram-like form, being built from two ingredients, a propagator,

and two vertices for splitting and joining strings, which can be used to glue three propagators together,

These vertices and propagators produce a single cover of the moduli space of $n$-point closed string scattering amplitudes so no higher order vertices are required. Similar vertices exist for the open string.

When one considers light-cone quantized superstrings, the discussion is more subtle as divergences can arise when the light-cone vertices collide. To produce a consistent theory, it is necessary to introduce higher order vertices, called contact terms, to cancel the divergences.

Light-cone string field theories have the disadvantage that they break manifest Lorentz invariance. However, in backgrounds with light-like Killing vectors, they can considerably simplify the quantization of the string action. Moreover, until the advent of the Berkovits string it was the only known method for quantizing strings in the presence of Ramond–Ramond fields. In recent research, light-cone string field theory played an important role in understanding strings in pp-wave backgrounds.

== Free covariant string field theory ==
An important step in the construction of covariant string field theories (preserving manifest Lorentz invariance) was the construction of a covariant kinetic term. This kinetic term can be considered a string field theory in its own right: the string field theory of free strings. Since the work of Warren Siegel, it has been standard to first BRST-quantize the free string theory and then second quantize so that the classical fields of the string field theory include ghosts as well as matter fields. For example, in the case of the bosonic open string theory in 26-dimensional flat spacetime, a general element of the Fock-space of the BRST quantized string takes the form (in radial quantization in the upper half plane),

$$|\Psi\rangle = \int d^{26} p  \left (T(p) c_1 e^{i p\cdot X} |0\rangle
+ A_\mu (p) \partial X^\mu c_1 e^{i p \cdot X} |0 \rangle + \chi (p) c_0 e^{i p \cdot X}|0\rangle + \ldots
\right),$$

where $|0\rangle$ is the free string vacuum and the dots represent more massive fields. In the language of worldsheet string theory, $T(p)$, $A_\mu(p)$, and $\chi(p)$ represent the amplitudes for the string to be found in the various basis states. After second quantization, they are interpreted instead as classical fields representing the tachyon $T$, gauge field $A_\mu$ and a ghost field $\chi$.

In the worldsheet string theory, the unphysical elements of the Fock space are removed by imposing the condition $Q_B |\Psi \rangle = 0$ as well as the equivalence relation $|\Psi \rangle \sim |\Psi\rangle + Q_B |\Lambda \rangle$. After second quantization, the equivalence relation is interpreted as a gauge invariance, whereas the condition that $|\Psi \rangle$ is physical is interpreted as an equation of motion. Because the physical fields live at ghostnumber one, it is also assumed that the string field $|\Psi \rangle$ is a ghostnumber one element of the Fock space.

In the case of the open bosonic string a gauge-unfixed action with the appropriate symmetries and equations of motion was originally obtained by André Neveu, Hermann Nicolai and Peter C. West. It is given by

$$S_{\text{free open}} (\Psi) = \tfrac{1}{2} \langle \Psi | Q_B |\Psi\rangle \ ,$$

where $\langle \Psi |$ is the BPZ-dual of $|\Psi \rangle$.

For the bosonic closed string, construction of a BRST-invariant kinetic term requires additionally that one impose $(L_0 - \tilde{L}_0) |\Psi\rangle = 0$ and $(b_0 - \tilde{b}_0) |\Psi\rangle = 0$. The kinetic term is then

$$S_{\text{free closed}} = \tfrac{1}{2} \langle \Psi | (c_0 - \tilde{c}_0) Q_B |\Psi \rangle  \ .$$

Additional considerations are required for the superstrings to deal with the superghost zero-modes.

== Witten's cubic open string field theory ==
The best studied and simplest of covariant interacting string field theories was constructed by Edward Witten. It describes the dynamics of bosonic open strings and is given by adding to the free open string action a cubic vertex:

$$S(\Psi) = \tfrac{1}{2} \langle \Psi |Q_B |\Psi \rangle + \tfrac{1}{3}  \langle \Psi,\Psi,\Psi \rangle$$,

where, as in the free case, $\Psi$ is a ghostnumber one element of the BRST-quantized free bosonic open-string Fock-space.

The cubic vertex,

$$\langle \Psi_1,\Psi_2,\Psi_3 \rangle$$

is a trilinear map which takes three string fields of total ghostnumber three and yields a number. Following Witten, who was motivated by ideas from noncommutative geometry, it is conventional to introduce the $*$-product defined implicitly through

$$\langle\Sigma | \Psi_1 *\Psi_2 \rangle = \langle\Sigma, \Psi_1,\Psi_2\rangle  \ .$$

The $*$-product and cubic vertex satisfy a number of important properties (allowing the $\Psi_i$ to be general ghost number fields):

1. Cyclicity :
  $$\langle \Psi_1, \Psi_2, \Psi_3 \rangle = (-1)^{gn(\Psi_3) * (gn(\Psi_2)+ gn(\Psi_1))}\langle \Psi_3, \Psi_1, \Psi_2 \rangle$$
2. BRST invariance :
  $$Q_B \langle \Psi_1, \Psi_2, \Psi_3 \rangle = \langle Q_B \Psi_1, \Psi_2,  \Psi_3 \rangle + (-1)^{gn(\Psi_1)}\langle \Psi_1, Q_B \Psi_2, \Psi_3 \rangle +(-1)^{gn(\Psi_1)+ gn(\Psi_2)}\langle \Psi_1, \Psi_2, Q_B \Psi_3 \rangle$$
  For the $*$-product, this implies that $Q_B$ acts as a graded derivation
  $$Q_B (\Psi_1 * \Psi_2) = (Q_B \Psi_1)*\Psi_2 + (-1)^{gn(\Psi_1)} \Psi_1 * (Q_B \Psi_2)$$
3. Associativity
  $$\left(\Psi_1 * \Psi_2\right) * \Psi_3 = \Psi_1 * (\Psi_2 * \Psi_3)$$
  In terms of the cubic vertex,
  $$\langle\Psi_1 ,\Psi_2 * \Psi_3,\Psi_4 \rangle =  \langle\Psi_1 ,\Psi_2 ,\Psi_3* \Psi_4 \rangle$$

In these equations, $gn(\Psi)$ denotes the ghost number of $\Psi$.

=== Gauge invariance ===
These properties of the cubic vertex are sufficient to show that $S(\Psi)$ is invariant under the Yang–Mills-like gauge transformation,

$$\Psi \to \Psi + Q_B \Lambda + \Psi * \Lambda - \Lambda * \Psi \ ,$$

where $\Lambda$ is an infinitesimal gauge parameter. Finite gauge transformations take the form

$$\Psi \to e^{-\Lambda} (\Psi + Q_B )e^{\Lambda}$$

where the exponential is defined by,

$$e^{\Lambda} = 1 + \Lambda + \tfrac{1}{2} \Lambda* \Lambda + \tfrac{1}{3!} \Lambda * \Lambda * \Lambda + \ldots$$

=== Equations of motion ===
The equations of motion are given by the following equation:

$$Q_B \Psi + \Psi * \Psi  = 0 \left. \right.  \ .$$

Because the string field $\Psi$ is an infinite collection of ordinary classical fields, these equations represent an infinite collection of non-linear coupled differential equations. There have been two approaches to finding solutions: First, numerically, one can truncate the string field to include only fields with mass less than a fixed bound, a procedure known as "level truncation". This reduces the equations of motion to a finite number of coupled differential equations and has led to the discovery of many solutions. Second, following the work of Martin Schnabl one can seek analytic solutions by carefully picking an ansatz which has simple behavior under star multiplication and action by the BRST operator. This has led to solutions representing marginal deformations, the tachyon vacuum solution and time-independent D-brane systems.

=== Quantization ===
To consistently quantize $S(\Psi)$ one has to fix a gauge. The traditional choice has been Feynman–Siegel gauge,

$$b_0 \Psi = 0 \left.\right. \ .$$

Because the gauge transformations are themselves redundant (there are gauge transformations of the gauge transformations), the gauge fixing procedure requires introducing an infinite number of ghosts via the BV formalism. The complete gauge fixed action is given by

$$S_{\text{gauge-fixed}} = \tfrac{1}{2} \langle \Psi | c_0 L_0 |\Psi\rangle + \tfrac{1}{3} \langle \Psi,\Psi,\Psi \rangle \ ,$$

where the field $\Psi$ is now allowed to be of arbitrary ghostnumber. In this gauge, the Feynman diagrams are constructed from a single propagator and vertex. The propagator takes the form of a strip of worldsheet of width $\pi$ and length $T$

There is also an insertion of an integral of the $b$-ghost along the red line. The modulus, $T$ is integrated from 0 to $\infty$.

The three vertex can be described as a way of gluing three propagators together, as shown in the following picture:

In order to represent the vertex embedded in three dimensions, the propagators have been folded in half along their midpoints. The resulting geometry is completely flat except for a single curvature singularity where the midpoints of the three propagators meet.

These Feynman diagrams generate a complete cover of the moduli space of open string scattering diagrams. It follows that, for on-shell amplitudes, the n-point open string amplitudes computed using Witten's open string field theory are identical to those computed using standard worldsheet methods.

== Supersymmetric covariant open string field theories ==
There are two main constructions of supersymmetric extensions of Witten's cubic open string field theory. The first is very similar in form to its bosonic cousin and is known as modified cubic superstring field theory. The second, due to Nathan Berkovits is very different and is based on a WZW-type action.

=== Modified cubic superstring field theory ===
The first consistent extension of Witten's bosonic open string field theory to the RNS string was constructed by Christian Preitschopf, Charles Thorn and Scott Yost and independently by Irina Aref'eva, P. B. Medvedev and A. P. Zubarev. The NS string field is taken to be a ghostnumber one picture zero string field in the small Hilbert space (i.e. $\eta_0 |\Psi\rangle = 0$). The action takes a very similar form to bosonic action,

$$S(\Psi) = \tfrac{1}{2} \langle \Psi |Y(i) Y(-i) Q_B |\Psi \rangle
+\tfrac{1}{3} \langle \Psi | Y(i) Y(-i) |\Psi * \Psi\rangle  \ ,$$

where,

$$Y(z) = -\partial \xi e^{-2 \phi} c(z)$$

is the inverse picture changing operator. The suggested $-\tfrac{1}{2}$ picture number extension of this theory to the Ramond sector might be problematic.

This action has been shown to reproduce tree-level amplitudes and has a tachyon vacuum solution with the correct energy. The one subtlety in the action is the insertion of picture changing operators at the midpoint, which imply that the linearized equations of motion take the form

$$Y(i)Y(-i) Q_B \Psi = 0 \left.\right. \ .$$

Because $Y(i) Y(-i)$ has a non-trivial kernel, there are potentially extra solutions that are not in the cohomology of $Q_B$. However, such solutions would have operator insertions near the midpoint and would be potentially singular, and importance of this problem remains unclear.

=== Berkovits superstring field theory ===
A very different supersymmetric action for the open string was constructed by Nathan Berkovits. It takes the form

$$S = \tfrac{1}{2} \langle e^{-\Phi} Q_B e^{\Phi} | e^{-\Phi} \eta_0 e^{\Phi} \rangle
- \tfrac{1}{2} \int_0^1 dt\langle e^{ -\hat{\Phi}} \partial_t e^{\hat{\Phi}}|\{e^{-\hat{\Phi}} Q_B
e^{\hat{\Phi}} , e^{-\hat{\Phi}} \eta_0 e^{\hat{\Phi}} \} \rangle$$

where all of the products are performed using the $*$-product including the anticommutator $\{,\}$, and $\hat{\Phi}(t)$ is any string field such that $\hat{\Phi}(0) = 0$ and $\hat{\Phi}(1) = \Phi$. The string field $\Phi$ is taken to be in the NS sector of the large Hilbert space, i.e. including the zero mode of $\xi$. It is not known how to incorporate the R sector, although some preliminary ideas exist.

The equations of motion take the form

$$\eta_0 \left(e^{-\Phi} Q_B e^{\Phi} \right) = 0 .$$

The action is invariant under the gauge transformation

$$e^{\Phi} \to e^{Q_B \Lambda} e^{\Phi} e^{\eta_0 \Lambda'} .$$

The principal advantage of this action is that it free from any insertions of picture-changing operators. It has been shown to reproduce correctly tree level amplitudes and has been found, numerically, to have a tachyon vacuum with appropriate energy. The known analytic solutions to the classical equations of motion include the tachyon vacuum and marginal deformations.

=== Other formulations of covariant open superstring field theory ===
A formulation of superstring field theory using the non-minimal pure-spinor variables was introduced by Berkovits. The action is cubic and includes a midpoint insertion whose kernel is trivial. As always within the pure-spinor formulation, the Ramond sector can be easily treated. However, it is not known how to incorporate the GSO- sectors into the formalism.

In an attempt to resolve the allegedly problematic midpoint insertion of the modified cubic theory, Berkovits and Siegel proposed a superstring field theory based on a non-minimal extension of the RNS string, which uses a midpoint insertion with no kernel. It is not clear if such insertions are in any way better than midpoint insertions with non-trivial kernels.

== Covariant closed string field theory ==
Covariant closed string field theories are considerably more complicated than their open string cousins. Even if one wants to construct a string field theory which only reproduces tree-level interactions between closed strings, the classical action must contain an infinite number of vertices consisting of string polyhedra.

If one demands that on-shell scattering diagrams be reproduced to all orders in the string coupling, one must also include additional vertices arising from higher genus (and hence higher order in $\hbar$) as well. In general, a manifestly BV invariant, quantizable action takes the form

$$S(\Psi) = \hbar \sum_{g \ge 0} (\hbar g_c)^{g-1} \sum_{n \ge 0} \frac{1}{n!} \{\Psi^n \}_g$$

where $\{ \Psi^n \}_g$ denotes an $n$th order vertex arising from a genus $g$ surface and $g_c$ is the closed string coupling. The structure of the vertices is in principle determined by a minimal area prescription, although, even for the polyhedral vertices, explicit computations have only been performed to quintic order.

== Covariant heterotic string field theory ==
A formulation of the NS sector of the heterotic string was given by Berkovits, Okawa and Zwiebach. The formulation amalgamates bosonic closed string field theory with Berkovits' superstring field theory.

== See also ==
- Conformal field theory
- F-theory
- Fuzzballs
- List of string theory topics
- Little string theory
- Loop quantum gravity
- Relationship between string theory and quantum field theory
- String cosmology
- Supergravity
- The Elegant Universe
- Zeta function regularization
