= Planetary civilization =

Civilization capable of using all of the energy on its planet

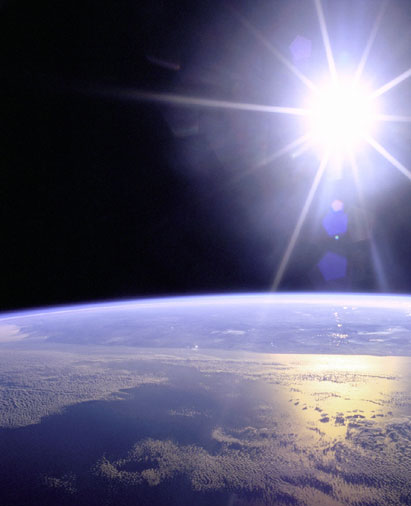
A planetary or a Type I civilization is a civilization that would be global, likely having a tolerant worldwide society that functions through science and reason, and is capable of consuming all of the incoming energy from its neighboring star, or about 10^{17} watts for Earth.

A planetary civilization or global civilization is a civilization of Type I on the Kardashev scale. This type of civilization is likely to be reliant on renewable energy sources such as stellar power, as well as powerful non-renewable sources such as nuclear fusion. A Type I civilization's energy consumption level is roughly equivalent to the solar insolation on Earth (between 10^{16} and 10^{17} watts) – around 3 orders of magnitude higher than that of contemporary humanity (around 2×10^{13} as of 2020).

== Planetary civilization – Type I civilization on Kardashev scale ==
Soviet astronomer Nikolai Kardashev, in his 1964 paper titled "Transmission of Information by Extraterrestrial Civilizations", proposed a scale intended to measure the level of technological development of civilizations based on the amount of energy that they are able to utilize, eponymously named the Kardashev scale.

A Type I civilization is planetary, consuming all energy that reaches its home planet from its parent star, equivalent to about 10^{17} watts in the case of Earth.

Carl Sagan suggested defining intermediate values (not considered in Kardashev's original scale) by interpolating and extrapolating the commonly used values for the energy consumption levels of types I (10^{16} W), II (10^{26} W) and III (10^{36} W). According to Sagan's extended model, modern-day humanity is describable as a Type 0.73 civilization as of 2020.

== Transition to a planetary civilization ==
Theoretical physicist Michio Kaku, in his book Physics of the Future, published in 2011, stated that, assuming sustained economic growth, humanity may attain planetary civilization status in 100 years.

But where is all this technological change leading? Where is the final destination in this long voyage into science and technology? The culmination of all these upheavals is the formation of planetary civilization, what physicists call a Type I civilization. This transition is perhaps the greatest transition in history, marking a sharp departure from all civilizations of the past. Every headline that dominates the news reflects, in some way, the birth pangs of the planetary civilization. Commerce, trade, culture, language, entertainment, leisure activities, and even war are all being revolutionized by the emergence of this planetary civilization.

— Michio Kaku, Physics of the Future

=== Danger ===
Michio Kaku, in his interview "Will Mankind Destroy Itself?" for "Big Think", discussed one possible danger of the transition to a planetary civilization:

So whenever I open the newspaper every headline I see in the newspaper points to the birth pangs of a type one civilization information. However, every time I open the newspaper I also see the opposite trend as well. What is terrorism? Terrorism in some sense is a reaction against the creation of a type one civilization. Now most terrorists cannot articulate this. They don’t even know what the hell I’m talking about, but what they’re reacting to is not modernism. What they’re reacting to is the fact that we’re headed toward a multicultural tolerant scientific society and that is what they don’t want. They don’t want science. They want a theocracy. They don’t want multiculturalism. They want monoculturalism. So instinctively they don’t like the march toward a type one civilization. Now which tendency will win? I don’t know, but I hope that we emerge as a type one civilization.

— Michio Kaku, "Will Mankind Destroy Itself?", 2010

== In science fiction ==
Many futuristic civilizations seen in science fiction are planetary civilizations. According to Michio Kaku, a typical Type I civilization would be that of Buck Rogers or Flash Gordon, where an entire planet's energy resources have been developed. They can control all the planetary sources of energy, so they might be able to control or modify weather at will, harness the power of a hurricane, and build cities on oceans. Nonetheless, their energy output is still largely confined to their home planet.

== Next status – stellar civilization ==
On the Kardashev scale, the next status (Type II) is a stellar civilization, a civilization that consumes all the energy that its parent star emits, or about 10^{27} watts. Michio Kaku suggests in the book "Physics of the Future" that humanity may attain stellar civilization status in a few thousand years.
