= Beyond Einstein =

Beyond Einstein may refer to:

- Beyond Einstein (book), a popular physics book by Michio Kaku and Jennifer Trainer
- Beyond Einstein program, a NASA space-exploration program
