= Last Days on Earth =

Science television programme

The Last Days on Earth is a 20/20 science special which aired on ABC in August 2006 and has been aired on The History Channel.

The show counts down the seven most likely ways in which human life could end, including gamma-ray bursts (GRBs), black holes, AI takeover, supervolcanoes, asteroids, nuclear warfare (atomic warfare), plague, and climate change (global warming). It includes input from a number of scientists including Michio Kaku, Neil deGrasse Tyson, Stephen Hawking and Kevin Warwick, as well as former vice president of the United States Al Gore. In 2007 it received an Emmy nomination for its graphic and artistic design.

== Disaster scenarios ==
These are organized from least likely to most likely:

7. Death of a star
  1. Gamma-ray burst
  2. Black hole
6. AI takeover (Singularitarianism)
5. Supervolcano
4. Asteroid (Impact event)
3. Nuclear warfare
2. Pandemic (Influenza)
1. Climate variability and change (Climate change)

== See also ==
- Global catastrophic risk
- Doomsday Clock
