= Time (2006 British TV documentary) =

Documentary television series

Time is a 2006 British documentary television programme first broadcast on BBC Four. It is written and presented by Michio Kaku.

== Episodes ==
The programme has four episodes:

1. "Daytime", exploring human perception of time in day-to-day life
2. "Lifetime", the effect of aging on human perception of time, and research into extending the human lifespan
3. "Earth Time", how an understanding of geological time changes the human race's perception of itself
4. "Cosmic Time", the current understanding of the nature of time on a cosmic scale

In one episode, a clinic evaluated what Kaku's "biological age" was. The test results said that the 58-year old Kaku was about 50 and his hands had a 30-year gap.

== Reception ==
Calling it "a promisingly abstruse series", Thomas Sutcliffe of The Independent praised Time, writing, "You watch some programmes and the minutes stretch to hours, while others barely seem to have begun before the final credits are rolling. And some mysteriously do both, replacing the mechanical clockwork pulse of schedule time with something audaciously different." In a negative review, Caitlin Moran said in The Times that Kaku was capable of detailing what time was in fewer than three minutes. She said, "Unfortunately, however, these are post-Dr Robert Stupid Winston times, where all scientific documentaries must be unbearable, stupid and slow, with lots of stop-motion effects, scudding clouds, busy streets, waves on the shore, etc. Ironically, really, it was all quite a waste of time."

Jim Gilchrist of The Scotsman wrote, "The four programmes take us on a mind-boggling journey, from our own relationship with time through the immensities of geological time, to the outer limits of the cosmos itself and the intriguing prospect of time travel." The Herald's Ian Bell praised the series, stating, "Time was good fun. Just flew by, in fact. Along the way, Professor Michio Kaku even gave a sound scientific explanation, albeit inadvertently, for one of the problems with Gideon's Daughter: time can indeed appear to slow down."
