= Bunji Sakita =

Japanese-American theoretical physicist

Bunji Sakita (崎田 文二, Sakita Bunji; 1930 – August 31, 2002) was a Japanese-American theoretical physicist who made important contributions in quantum field theory, superstring theory and discovered supersymmetry in 1971. He was a distinguished professor of physics at the City College of New York.

== Early years ==
Bunji Sakita was born in Japan in 1930 in the Toyama prefecture. He received his bachelor's degree from Kanazawa University in 1953. He then worked with Sakata's group in Nagoya University, obtaining his master's degree in 1956. He was among a select group of Japanese students recruited by Robert Marshak to come for graduate studies to the University of Rochester. In Rochester, Sakita worked with Professor Charles Goebel and received his Ph.D. in 1959. He went on to a postdoctoral position and a professorship at the University of Wisconsin–Madison. In his beginning years at Wisconsin, and during a year he spent at the Argonne National Laboratory, he developed the SU(6) symmetry of the nonrelativistic quark model generalizing Wigner's supermultiplet symmetry of combining spin and isospin.

In 1967, during a visit to Israel, he learned of the dual resonance model, and his later work at Wisconsin was mostly devoted to this idea. With Goebel, he obtained the many-particle generalization of the Veneziano amplitude. In work with Keiji Kikkawa, M. A. Virasoro and others, he addressed the problem of unitarity of the dual amplitudes, setting up the formalism of dual diagrams, analogous to Feynman diagrams, for the computation of loop amplitudes. In work done with C.S. Hsue, M. A. Virasoro and notably with Jean-Loup Gervais, Sakita developed the functional formalism for these calculations in which summation over Riemann surfaces naturally emerged.

== Supersymmetry ==
In 1971, Jean-Loup Gervais and Bunji Sakita, in a paper titled "Field Theory Interpretation of Supergauges in Dual Models", showed the boson–fermion symmetry of the fermionic string theory, writing down the first linear supersymmetric action. In modern parlance the Gervais–Sakita Lagrangian has a local superconformal symmetry. The 1973 work of Wess and Zumino extended the two-dimensional supersymmetry discovered in string theory to four-dimensional field theories with spacetime supersymmetry. (Different versions of supersymmetry had been discovered by two Soviet physicists, Yu. A. Gol'fand and E.P. Likhtman a little earlier; this was not known to physicists elsewhere at that time.)

In 1970, Robert Marshak became president of the City College of New York. Sakita moved there as distinguished professor to participate in the rapid expansion of the physics program and to lead the High Energy Group. A strong group was built up with first rate work on many areas such as string theory, supersymmetry, particle phenomenology and others.

== Sakita and CCNY ==
Sakita was an mentor with an intense working relationship with many of his students whom he treated as his equals. Many of the CCNY students and research associates of this time have gone onto distinguished careers of their own. In recognition of his many contributions, he was the recipient of a Guggenheim Fellowship in 1970 and was awarded the Nishina Memorial Prize of Japan in 1974.

== Death ==
He died on August 31, 2002, in Japan after a year-long battle with cancer. He is survived by his children Mariko Sakita, Mark Mozeson and Taro Sakita, and his grandchildren Evan, Sarah, and Kayla Mozeson.
