= Visions of the Future =

- Starring: Michio Kaku
- Country of origin: United Kingdom
- Original language: English
- No. of seasons: 1
- No. of episodes: 3

Production
- Running time: 1 hour per episode

Original release
- Network: BBC Four
- Release: 5 November – 19 November 2007

Visions of the Future is a 2007 documentary television series aired on the BBC Four television channel. The series stars theoretical physicist and futurist Michio Kaku as he documents cutting-edge science.

There are three installments in the series.

== Episodes ==
=== The Intelligence Revolution ===
- The Intelligence Revolution - Kaku explains how he believes artificial intelligence will revolutionize the world. Also, Kaku investigates virtual reality technology and its potential. Controversially, Kaku documents the work of scientists using a combination of artificial intelligence and neuroscience technology transform a person suffering from major depressive disorder into one who is happy and content by the push of a button.

List of technologies:

- Autonomous car
- Ubiquitous computing and Internet of things
- E-textiles
- Head-mounted display
  - Virtual retinal display
  - Virtual reality
  - Augmented reality
- Immersive virtual reality
- Robotics and artificial intelligence
- Cyborgology, Bionics and human enhancement

=== The Biotech Revolution ===
- The Biotech Revolution - This episode focuses mainly on recent advances in genetics and biotechnology. Amongst other things Kaku documents advances in DNA screening, gene therapy and lab-grown organ transplants.

List of technologies:

- Whole genome sequencing and personalized medicine
- Genetic engineering
  - Gene therapy
  - Designer baby
- Cancer Genome Project
- Regenerative medicine
  - Tissue engineering, Printable organs
  - Cell therapy
  - Immunomodulation therapy
- Life extension
  - Sirtuin 1
- Transhumanism

=== The Quantum Revolution ===
- The Quantum Revolution - Kaku investigates the advances of quantum physics and the effects it could have on the average human life. Kaku looks at the work of science fiction writers and the way that many concepts conceived for entertainment could in fact become reality. Kaku also speculates about the effects that such technology may have on the future of the human species.

List of technologies:

- High-temperature superconductivity
- Metamaterial
- Carbon nanotube
- Space elevator
- Nuclear fusion
- Nanotechnology
  - Nanorobotics
  - Molecular assembler
- Quantum teleportation
