= Quantum Supremacy =

2023 book by Michio Kaku

Quantum Supremacy: How the Quantum Computer Revolution Will Change Everything
- Hardcover edition
- Author: Michio Kaku
- Language: English
- Genre: Popular science
- Publisher: Doubleday
- Publication date: 2 May 2023
- Publication place: United States
- Media type: Print, ebook
- Pages: 352
- ISBN: 978-0385548366
- Preceded by: The God Equation

Quantum Supremacy: How the Quantum Computer Revolution Will Change Everything is a non-fiction book by the American futurist and physicist Michio Kaku. The book, Kaku's eleventh, was initially published on 2 May 2023 by Doubleday.

== Overview ==
The book concentrates on quantum computing and its uses for various tasks. This is an accessible and engaging account of how quantum computers could radically change the world. Kaku not only explains complex science in simple terms but also paints a broad picture of the technology's implications for economics, medicine, security, artificial intelligence, and even philosophy.

== Reception ==
Scott Aaronson, professor of computer science at the University of Texas at Austin, severely panned Kaku's book on his blog, Shtetl-Optimized. Aaronson wrote, "beating out a crowded field, this is the worst book about quantum computing, for some definition of the word 'about,' that I’ve ever encountered", describing the book as a "kindergarten of lies". After pointing out several substantial factual errors, Aaronson concluded that "the bulk of the book is actually about stuff with no direct relation to quantum computing at all—the origin of life, climate change, energy generation, cancer, curing aging, etc.—except with ungrounded speculations tacked onto the end of each chapter about how quantum computers will someday revolutionize all of this."

Reviews from non-specialists were mixed to positive. Kirkus Reviews wrote, "As always, Kaku’s enthusiasm is contagious, and this latest book is an important guide to a crucial part of the tech future. An informative and highly entertaining read about the computing revolution already underway." A reviewer of Publishers Weekly commented, "Despite Kaku’s best efforts, readers will likely be left scratching their heads at the descriptions of how different models of quantum computing work, with one that involves 'ion traps' in which atoms spin upward or downward and another that takes advantage of the polarization of light... Difficult to grasp and carrying a whiff of ungrounded techno-utopianism, this is a rare misfire for Kaku." Alan Boyle of GeekWire added, "One is a mind-blowing work of fiction, while the other is an emerging frontier in computer science — but both of them deal with rearrangements of particles in superposition that don’t match our usual view of reality. Fortunately, theoretical physicist Michio Kaku has provided a guidebook to the real-life frontier..."
