= Parallel Worlds (book) =

2004 book by Michio Kaku

Parallel Worlds: A Journey Through Creation, Higher Dimensions, and the Future of the Cosmos
- First edition cover art
- Author: Michio Kaku
- Language: English
- Subject: Physics
- Genre: Popular science
- Publisher: Doubleday
- Publication date: December 28, 2004
- Publication place: United States
- Media type: Print (hardcover)
- Pages: 428
- ISBN: 978-0385509862
- LC Class: QB981 .K134 2005
- Preceded by: Visions (book)
- Followed by: Physics of the Impossible

Parallel Worlds: A Journey Through Creation, Higher Dimensions, and the Future of the Cosmos is a popular science book by Michio Kaku first published in 2004.

== Contents ==
The book has twelve chapters arranged in three parts. Part I (Chapters 1–4) covers the Big Bang, the early development of the Universe, and how these topics relate to the Eternal Inflation Multiverse (Level II in the Tegmark hierarchy of Multiverses). Part II (Chapters 5–9) covers M-Theory and the "Many-Worlds interpretation" of Quantum Mechanics (Level III Multiverse). It also discusses how future technology will enable the creation of wormholes. Part III discusses the Big Freeze and how a Hyperspace wormhole (one in 11-dimensional Hyperspace rather than 3-dimensional normal space) will enable civilization and life to escape to a younger Universe.

== Theme ==
In Parallel Worlds, Kaku presents many of the leading theories in physics; from Newtonian physics to Relativity to Quantum Physics to String theory and even into the newest version of string theory, called M-theory. He makes available to the reader a comprehensive description of theories in physics, including many predictions each theory makes, what physicists, astronomers, and cosmologists are looking for now and what technology they are using in their research.

== Reception ==
Scarlett Thomas writing for The Independent calls Parallel Worlds "absolutely impossible to put down." Mark Mortimer for Universe Today felt the book maintains a nice balance between detail and corollary while sometimes drifting to the philosophical side of things. Gerry Gilmore of the Institute of Astronomy, wrote that the book "is not a classic, but does raise many interesting ideas." Gilmore praised the book for its "exotic physics" and felt there were "lots of intellectual challenge" but believed there "was a little too much of a pot-pourri." Gilmore wrote that the biggest weakness of the book is how it covers astrophysical history.

The book was a finalist for the Samuel Johnson Prize for non-fiction in the UK.

== See also ==
- Many-worlds interpretation
- The 4 Percent Universe by Richard Panek
- The Elegant Universe by Brian Greene
- The Fabric of the Cosmos by Brian Greene
- The Fabric of Reality by David Deutsch
- The Universe in a Nutshell by Stephen Hawking
- The Science of Interstellar by Kip Thorne
