= Physics of the Future =

2011 book by Michio Kaku

Physics of the Future: How Science Will Shape Human Destiny and Our Daily Lives by the Year 2100
- Hardcover edition
- Author: Michio Kaku
- Cover artist: Michael J Windsor
- Language: English
- Genre: Popular science
- Publisher: Doubleday
- Publication date: March 15, 2011
- Publication place: United States
- Media type: Print (hardcover)
- Pages: 416
- ISBN: 978-0-385-53080-4
- LC Class: Q175.5 .K257 2011
- Preceded by: Physics of the Impossible
- Followed by: The Future of the Mind

Physics of the Future: How Science Will Shape Human Destiny and Our Daily Lives by the Year 2100 is a 2011 book by theoretical physicist Michio Kaku, author of Hyperspace and Physics of the Impossible. In it Kaku speculates about possible future technological development over the next 100 years. He interviews notable scientists about their fields of research and lays out his vision of coming developments in medicine, computing, artificial intelligence, nanotechnology, and energy production. The book was on the New York Times Bestseller List for five weeks.

Kaku writes how he hopes his predictions for 2100 will be as successful as science fiction writer Jules Verne's 1863 novel Paris in the Twentieth Century. Kaku contrasts Verne's foresight against U.S. Postmaster General John Wanamaker, who in 1893 predicted that mail would still be delivered by stagecoach and horseback in 100 years' time, and IBM chairman Thomas J. Watson, who in 1943 is alleged to have said "I think there is a world market for maybe five computers." Kaku points to this long history of failed predictions against progress to underscore his notion "that it is very dangerous to bet against the future".

== Contents ==
Each chapter is sorted into three sections: Near future (2000–2030), Midcentury (2030–2070), and Far future (2070–2100). Kaku notes that the time periods are only rough approximations, but show the general time frame for the various trends in the book.

=== Future of the Computer: Mind over Matter ===
Kaku begins with Moore's law, and compares a chip that sings "Happy Birthday" with the Allied forces in 1945, stating that the chip contains much more power, and that "Hitler, Churchill, or Roosevelt might have killed to get that chip." He predicts that computer power will increase to the point where computers, like electricity, paper, and water, "disappear into the fabric of our lives, and computer chips will be planted in the walls of buildings."

He also predicts that glasses and contact lenses will be connected to the internet, using similar technology to virtual retinal displays. Cars will become driverless due to the power of the GPS system. This prediction is supported by the results of the Urban Challenge. The Pentagon hopes to make 1/3 of the United States ground forces automated by 2015. Technology similar to BrainGate will eventually allow humans to control computers with tiny brain sensors, and "like a magician, move objects around with the power of our minds."

=== Future of AI: Rise of the Machines ===
Kaku discusses robotic body parts, modular robots, unemployment caused by robots, surrogates and avatars (like their respective movies), and reverse engineering the brain. Kaku goes over the three laws of robotics and their contradictions. He endorses a "chip in robot brains to automatically shut them off if they have murderous thoughts", and believes that the most likely scenario is one in which robots are free to wreak havoc and destruction, but are designed to desire benevolence.

=== Future of Medicine: Perfection and Beyond ===
Kaku believes that in the future, reprogramming one's genes can be done by using a specially programmed virus, which can activate genes that slow the aging process. Nanotech sensors in a room will check for various diseases and cancer, nanobots will be able to inject drugs into individual cells when diseases are found, and advancements in extracting stem cells will be manifest in the art of growing new organs. The idea of resurrecting an extinct species might now be biologically possible.

=== Nanotechnology: Everything from Nothing? ===
Kaku discusses programmable matter, quantum computers, carbon nanotubes, and the possibility of replicators. He also expects a variety of nanodevices that search and destroy cancer cells cleanly, leaving normal cells intact.

=== Future of Energy: Energy from the Stars ===
Kaku discusses the draining of oil on the planet by pointing to the Hubbert curve, and the rising problem of immigrants who wish to live the American dream of wasteful energy consumption. He predicts that hydrogen and solar energy will be the future, noting how Henry Ford and Thomas Edison bet on whether oil or electricity would dominate, and describing fusion with lasers or magnetic fields, and dismisses cold fusion as "a dead end". Kaku suggests that nations are reluctant to deal with global warming because the extravagance of oil, being the cheapest source of energy, encourages economic growth. Kaku believes that in the far future, room-temperature superconductors will usher the era of magnet-powered floating cars and trains.

=== Future of Space Travel: To the Stars ===
Unlike conventional chemical rockets which use Newton's third law of motion, solar sails take advantage of radiation pressure from stars. Kaku believes that after sending a gigantic solar sail into orbit, one could install lasers on the moon, which would hit the sail and give it extra momentum.

Another alternative is to send thousands of nanoships, of which only a few would reach their destination. "Once arriving on a nearby moon, they could create a factory to make unlimited copies of themselves," says Kaku. Nanoships would require very little fuel to accelerate. They could visit the stellar neighborhood by floating on the magnetic fields of other planets.

=== Future of Wealth: Winners and Losers ===
Kaku discusses how Moore's law of robotics will affect the future of capitalism, which nations will survive and grow, and how the United States is "brain-draining" off of immigrants to fuel their economy.

=== Future of Humanity: Planetary Civilization ===
Kaku ranks the civilization of the future, with classifications based on energy consumption, entropy, and information processing. Kaku stated that humans with an average economic growth may attain planetary civilization status in 100 years, "unless there is a natural catastrophe or some calamitous act of folly, it is inevitable that we will enter this phase of our collective history".

== Reception ==
The book got mixed reviews, and was generally regarded as having interesting insights that were delivered in an over-optimistic but bland style.

Kirkus Reviews stated "The author’s scientific expertise will engage readers too sophisticated for predictions based on psychic powers or astrology." Reviewers at Library Journal have stated, "This work is highly recommended for fans of Kaku’s previous books and for readers interested in science and robotics."

The Wall Street Journal considers it a "largely optimistic view of the future". The Telegraph complained that "[Physics of the Future] is partisan about technology in a way that smacks of Gerard K. O'Neill’s deliriously technocratic vision of space exploration, The High Frontier." The Guardian stated "despite the relentless technological optimism, Kaku does conjure up a genuinely exciting panorama of revolutionary science and magical technology".

The New York Times complained the book's style is often "dull and charmless", but acknowledged it had the ability to "enthrall and frighten" as well. Writing in Physics Today, physicist Neil Gershenfeld said that the book has “an appealing premise” but describes “a kind of future by committee” populated by “science-fiction staples”. Gershenfeld said, “Such a forecast could have been accomplished with less effort by collating covers from popular science magazines.” Gershenfeld criticizes Kaku for “some surprising physics errors”, such as ignoring air friction on maglev vehicles. Kaku is praised for raising “profound questions”, such as the effect of affluence in the future, or the decoupling of sensory experience from reality. However, Gershenfeld laments that these questions are asked in the margins and not given a deep treatment. “It would have been more relevant to learn the author’s perspective on these questions than to find out where and to whom he’s presented lectures,” Gershenfeld said. The Economist is skeptical about prediction in general pointing out that unforeseen "unknown unknowns" led to many disruptive technologies over the century just past.
