= Clifford V. Johnson =

British physicist (born 1968)

Clifford Victor Johnson
- Born: 5 March 1968 (age 58); London, United Kingdom
- Education: University of Southampton (PhD); Imperial College London (BSc)
- Awards: Maxwell Medal and Prize (2005); Andrew Gemant Award (2022)
- Scientific career
- Fields: theoretical physics, particle physics, mathematical physics
- Workplaces: University of California, Santa Barbara; Kavli Institute for Theoretical Physics; University of Southern California; Institute for Advanced Study; Princeton University; Durham University

Clifford Victor Johnson (born 5 March 1968) is a British theoretical physicist and professor at the UCSB department of Physics.

== Biography ==
Johnson was born in London, England, and lived in Montserrat for 10 years. From an early age, Johnson was interested in electronics. He would spend time reading on the subject, and designing small machinery such as radios. He graduated with a Bachelor of Science in Physics from Imperial College London in 1989 and he completed his Doctor of Philosophy in Mathematics and Physics from the University of Southampton in 1992.

Johnson's research focus is in superstring theory and particle physics, specifically related to strongly coupled phenomena. He has previously worked at the Kavli Institute for Theoretical Physics at the University of California, Santa Barbara, the Institute for Advanced Study, Durham University and Princeton University as a postdoctoral fellow. He worked as an assistant professor at the University of Kentucky from 1997 to 1999, and has been a physics professor at the University of Southern California's Department of Physics and Astronomy. In July 2023, he returned to the University of California, Santa Barbara. He received the 2005 Maxwell Medal and Prize from the Institute of Physics, "For his outstanding contribution to string theory, quantum gravity and its interface with strongly coupled field theory, in particular for his work on understanding the censorship of singularities and the thermodynamic properties of quantum spacetime. He received a National Science Foundation CAREER Award in 1997. In 2005, The Journal of Blacks in Higher Education listed Clifford Johnson as the most highly cited black professor of mathematics or a related field at an American university or college. He was named a Fellow of the American Physical Society in 2021. In 2022, Johnson was award AIP's Andrew Gemant award for his artistic and creative approach towards physics outreach and education. Johnson has also been awarded the Institute of Physics' James Clerk Maxwell Medal and Prize.

He also actively works to promote science in the public and physics outreach. As part of this effort, he regularly appears on the History Channel series The Universe and acts as a science consultant for the Discovery Channel. Johnson founded the African Summer Theory Institute, "which brings teachers, researchers, and students of all levels together for a month-long conference on a science topic—a different one every year—to discuss, to network, and, of course, to learn." Johnson is also the author of an introductory scientific graphic novel, The Dialogues: Conversations about the Nature of the Universe . The book is a discussion on how to talk about scientific topics and exchange scientific ideas.

He has also served as a science consultant for science fiction films and television shows including Avengers: Endgame and Star Trek: Discovery, and Apple TV's Dark Matter. He made a brief cameo appearance in the 2020 film Palm Springs. In 2023, he was a guest on The Life Scientific on BBC Radio 4.

== Bibliography ==
- The Dialogues Conversations about the Nature of the Universe. MIT Press. 2017. ISBN 978-0262037235.
- Clifford V. Johnson (2003). D-Branes. Cambridge University Press. ISBN 0-521-80912-6.
