= Jean-Loup Gervais =

French theoretical physicist

Jean-Loup Gervais (10 September 1936 – 1 February 2020) was a French theoretical physicist.

Gervais studied physics and mathematics in Paris, where he graduated in 1961 and got his Ph.D. in 1965 as a student of Claude Bouchiat and Philippe Meyer in Orsay. From 1966 to 1968 he was a post-doctoral researcher at New York University. Already since 1960 he was employed at the CNRS, from 1970 on as Maître de conférences. During 1973–1985 he was Maître de conférences at École polytechnique.

From 1979 to 1983 and from 1995 to 1998 he was director of the Laboratory of Theoretical Physics of the École Normale Supérieure. He had been a guest professor at the City College of New York and also partly at University of California, Berkeley, at the Isaac Newton Institute in Cambridge (1997), at University of California, Los Angeles (UCLA) and at University of California, Santa Barbara.

Gervais worked on quantum field theory, supersymmetry and string theory. In 1969, he investigated (together with Benjamin W. Lee) renormalisability of theories of spontaneous symmetry breaking. In 1971, he presented with Bunji Sakita a supersymmetric invariant Lagrangian in the framework of a precursor of string theory, called the dual resonance models.

In 1969, he calculated one-loop diagrams in the early string theory, with Daniele Amati and Bouchiat. In the beginning of the 1970s, he also studied, with Sakita, string theories as conformal field theories in two dimensions and then soliton theories as field theories of collective excitations, e.g., in the context of WKB wave functions.

In the 1980s he studied soliton (Skyrmion) models of quarks in the limit of many color degrees of freedom (large-N limit). He then also considered conformal field theories such as the Liouville field theory, string theories and two-dimensional quantum gravity from the point of view of exactly integrable systems. With André Neveu, he investigated in the 1980s also non-critical string theories.

In 1997 he was awarded the Prix Créé par l'État from the French Académie des sciences.

Among his Ph.D. students are particle physicists Antal Jevicki (now professor at Brown University) and Adel Bilal.
