= Science & Entertainment Exchange =

Science education

The Science & Entertainment Exchange is a program run and developed by the United States National Academy of Sciences (NAS) to increase public awareness, knowledge, and understanding of science and advanced science technology through its representation in television, film, and other media. It serves as a pro-science movement with the main goal of re-cultivating how science and scientists truly are in order to rid the public of false perceptions on these topics. The Exchange provides entertainment industry professionals with access to credible and knowledgeable scientists and engineers who help to encourage and create effective representations of science and scientists in the media, whether it be on television, in films, plays, etc. The Exchange also helps the science community understand the needs and requirements of the entertainment industry, while making sure science is conveyed in a correct and positive manner to the target audience.

Officially launched in November 2008, the Exchange arranges direct consultations between scientists and entertainment professionals who develop science-themed content. This collaboration allows for industry professionals to portray science accurately and in greater quantities in their media productions. It also provides scientists and science organizations with the opportunity to communicate effectively with a large audience that may otherwise be hard to reach such as through innovative physics outreach. It also provides a variety of other services, including scheduling briefings, brainstorming sessions, screenings, and salons. The Exchange is based in Los Angeles, California.

Rick Loverd currently serves as Program Director of the Exchange.

== Examples ==
=== Watchmen ===
In one of its first acts of business, The Science & Entertainment Exchange connected Alex McDowell, the production designer for the 2009 film adaptation of the graphic novel Watchmen, with University of Minnesota physics professor James Kakalios. Kakalios is the author of the book The Physics of Superheroes, and was selected as a science consultant in part because of his extensive experience incorporating comic book superheroes into his writings and lectures as a way to motivate the public to take an interest in science. In the run up to the theatrical release of Watchmen, Kakalios and the University of Minnesota produced a short video (with more than 1,500,000 views as of April 29, 2009) explaining the science behind Dr. Manhattan's super powers to increase public awareness of the science behind the film.

=== Fringe ===
The TV series Fringe is using the Exchange to identify scientists able to address technical questions regarding scripts in development. A rapid-response team of specialists in neuroscience, epidemiology, and genetics—themes frequently featured in the series—has been gathered to assist the scriptwriters.

=== Thor ===
Thor screenwriters connected through The Exchange with Kevin Hand from Caltech's Jet Propulsion Lab, who helped them turn the comic book's mythological worlds into believable cinematic scenery.

In addition, the collaboration resulted in the film featuring Natalie Portman as Jane Foster, a female physicist. This worked towards eliminating the stereotype that many hold viewing scientists strictly as men. This action also served to portray scientists in a positive, relatable manner which so many other media productions miss the mark on completely by making scientists out to be mean, evil, and cruel. This outcome illustrates a main goal of the Exchange, to use popular entertainment media to better communicate to the public about the true realities of scientists and science information in general.

== Implications on public conceptions ==
George Gerbner's Cultivation theory identifies television and film as a main source of information and storytelling in today's world, and Gebner researched the potential effect of portrayals of science in the media on public perceptions of science and scientists.

Gerbner's research used cultivation analysis to understand and examine the response patterns of 1,631 respondents' group which includes light and heavy viewers. They were presented with five propositions - science makes our way of life change too fast; makes our lives healthier, easier, and more comfortable; breaks down people's ideas of right and wrong; is more likely to cause problems than to find solutions; and the growth of science means that a few people can control our lives. The research estimated the percentage of positive responses to science based on two groups divided by sex and education. The study suggested that "the exposure to science through television shows cultivate less favorable orientation towards science, especially in high status groups whose light-viewer members are its greatest supporters, and lower status groups have a generally low opinion of science." These observations can be understood through the concept of mainstreaming.

Furthermore, entertainment media have often portrayed scientists as evil, mean, and cruel, notably including the Mad scientist stock character. Gerbner suggests that, with movies and television portraying a larger ratio of villainous scientists in a major roles than doctors or law enforcers, these media effects have cultivated a false perception of scientists, and science in general. Although trust in science has always been high, with movies and television continuously negatively portraying scientists, the effects of the entertainment industry can cause people's perception of scientists to be skewed.

In addition, the more people watch television, the more they think that scientists are odd, peculiar, have few interests outside of work and spend little time with their families. These negatives stereotypes associated with scientists can lead a detrimental impact on the attitude towards science as heavy TV viewers are more likely to have lower or no appreciation to the benefits of science.

== Science as social context ==
In a study of the audience effects for the 2004 blockbuster The Day After Tomorrow, viewers of the film, after controlling for education, gender, age, and political views, were significantly more concerned about global climate change, more likely to take action to reduce greenhouse gas emissions, and more trusting of government agencies such as NASA and NOAA.

As news agenda-setters, film and television can also have an important indirect influence. These films provide dramatic "news pegs" for journalists seeking to either sustain or generate new coverage of an issue. For example, studies comparing the news attention sparked by the 2001 release of the Third IPCC report on climate change with the amount of coverage generated by the 2004 release of The Day After Tomorrow and the 2006 release of Al Gore's An Inconvenient Truth, find that both films far surpassed the IPCC report in media publicity. This illustrates the great power that the entertainment media industry has in communicating with a lay audience. Science is a topic that most laymen seem to disregard, and do not show great interest or concern in. By incorporating it into a more mainstream media environment, such as television series and films versus scientific journals and newspapers, the Exchange allows scientific information and news to be communicated in an accurate and clear manner to those that would otherwise ignore the subject.

In another example, the 1998 releases of the blockbusters Deep Impact and Armageddon galvanized news attention to the potential problem of Near Earth Objects, a science policy issue that otherwise rarely, if ever, receives news attention.

Scientific verisimilitude in movies and television has been positively correlated with commercial success, providing "realism" and "legitimacy" to which audiences respond.

== Advisory board ==
- Marcia Kemper McNutt, chair, president, National Academy of Sciences
- Janet Zucker, vice-chair, producer
- Jerry Zucker, vice-chair, director
- Patrick Soon-Shiong, vice-chair, chairman and chief executive officer, Abraxis Bioscience, Inc. and The Chan Soon-Shiong Family Foundation
- Len Amato, president, HBO Films
- Paula Apsell, senior executive producer, NOVA; director, WGBH Science Unit
- Dave Bartis, producer
- Gregory Benford, professor of physics, University of California, Irvine
- May Berenbaum, professor of entomology, University of Illinois at Urbana-Champaign
- Adam Bly, founder and publisher, SEED
- Clark Bunting, president and general manager, Emerging Networks, Discovery Communications
- Rick Carter, production designer
- Steven Chu, United States Secretary of Energy, 2009–2013, director, Lawrence Berkeley National Laboratory; professor of physics and professor of molecular and cell biology, University of California, Berkeley; 1997 Nobel Prize winner in Physics
- Frank Darabont, writer / producer / director
- Keith Devlin, executive director, Center for the Study of Language and Information, Stanford University; consulting professor, mathematics, Stanford University
- Jon Farhat, director, VFX
- Anthony Fauci, director, National Institute of Allergy and Infectious Diseases, National Institutes of Health
- Sid Ganis, producer
- Julie Gerberding, former director, Centers for Disease Control and Prevention
- Neil Gershenfeld, director, Center for Bits and Atoms, Massachusetts Institute of Technology
- Ronald Graham, professor of computer science and engineering, University of California, San Diego; chief scientist, California Institute for Telecommunications and Information Technology
- Brian Greene, professor of mathematics and physics, Columbia University
- Davis Guggenheim, director / producer
- Robert M. Hazen, research scientist, Carnegie Institution for Science's Geophysical Laboratory; Clarence Robinson Professor of Earth Science at George Mason University
- Dudley Herschbach, Frank B. Baird, Jr. Professor of Science, Harvard University; 1986 Nobel Prize winner in Chemistry
- Marshall Herskovitz, producer / writer / director
- Dustin Hoffman, actor / producer
- Marty Kaplan, Norman Lear Chair in Entertainment, Media and Society, University of Southern California Annenberg School for Communication; director, The Norman Lear Center
- Lawrence Kasdan, director / writer / producer
- Jeffrey Koplan, vice president for Academic Health Affairs, Woodruff Health Sciences Center, Emory University
- Lawrence Krauss, professor, School of Earth and Space Exploration, Arizona State University
- Sherry Lansing, founder, Sherry Lansing Foundation; former CEO, Paramount Pictures
- Leon Lederman, director emeritus of Fermi National Accelerator Laboratory; Pritzker Professor of Science at Illinois Institute of Technology; 1988 Nobel Prize winner in Physics
- Doug Liman, producer / director
- Seth MacFarlane, writer / actor / producer
- Alex McDowell, production designer
- Marvin Minsky, professor of computer science and media arts and sciences, Massachusetts Institute of Technology
- Sidney Perkowitz, Charles Howard Candler Professor of Physics, Emory University
- Steven Pinker, Johnstone Family Professor of Psychology, Harvard University
- Stanley Prusiner, professor of neurology and director of the Institute for Neurodegenerative Diseases, University of California, San Francisco; 1997 Nobel Prize winner in Medicine or Physiology
- Rob Reiner, actor / producer / writer / director
- John Rennie, editor-in-chief, Scientific American
- Jay Roach, director / writer / producer
- Bruce Joel Rubin, writer
- Oliver Sacks, professor of neurology and psychiatry, Columbia University Medical Center
- Barbara Schaal, Spencer T. Olin Professor of Biology, Washington University; director of the Schaal Lab, Washington University; vice president, National Academy of Sciences
- Tom Schulman, writer
- Jeffrey Silver, producer
- Anne E. Simon, professor, Department of Cell Biology and Molecular Genetics, University of Maryland at College Park
- Alex Singer, director
- Robert Sproull, vice president and Sun Fellow, Sun Microsystems, Inc.
- John Underkoffler, co-founder, Oblong Industries
- J. Craig Venter, president, J. Craig Venter Institute
- Doron Weber, director for public understanding of science and technology and the history of science and technology, Alfred P. Sloan Foundation
