= Visions (book) =

1998 book by Michio Kaku

Visions: How Science Will Revolutionize the 21st Century
- First edition
- Author: Michio Kaku
- Language: English
- Subject: Physics
- Genre: Popular science
- Publisher: Doubleday
- Publication date: 1997
- Publication place: United States
- ISBN: 978-0385484992
- Preceded by: Hyperspace (book)
- Followed by: Einstein's Cosmos

Visions: How Science Will Revolutionize the 21st Century is a popular science book by Michio Kaku first published in 1997. In Visions, Kaku examines the great scientific revolutions that have dramatically reshaped the twentieth century, namely quantum mechanics, biotechnology, and artificial intelligence and shows how they will change and alter science and the way we live.
