= Beyond Einstein (book) =

1987 book by Michio Kaku

Beyond Einstein: The Cosmic Quest for the Theory of the Universe
- Paperback edition
- Author: Michio Kaku, Jennifer Trainer
- Language: English
- Genre: Popular science
- Publisher: Bantam Books
- Publication date: February 1, 1987
- Publication place: United States
- Media type: Print
- Pages: 225 pp.
- ISBN: 978-0553343496
- Followed by: Hyperspace (book)

Beyond Einstein: The Cosmic Quest for the Theory of the Universe is a book by Michio Kaku, a theoretical physicist from the City College of New York, and Jennifer Trainer Thompson. It focuses on the development of superstring theory, which might become the unified field theory of the strong force, the weak force, electromagnetism and gravity. The book was initially published on February 1, 1987, by Bantam Books.

== Overview ==
Beyond Einstein tries to explain the basics of superstring theory. Michio Kaku analyzes the history of theoretical physics and the struggle to formulate a unified field theory. He posits that the superstring theory might be the only theory that can unite quantum mechanics and general relativity in one theory.
