= Michio Kaku =

American theoretical physicist, futurist and author

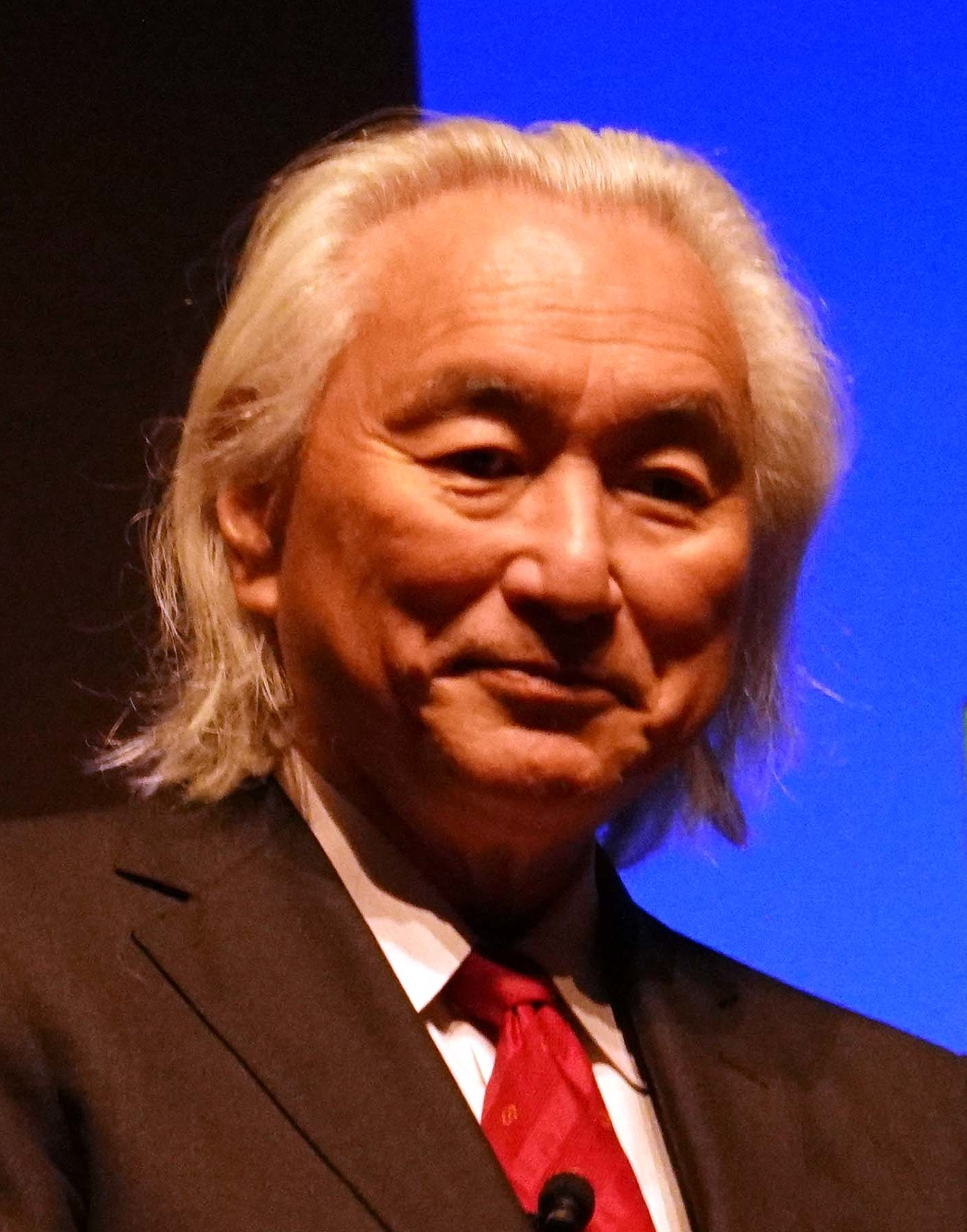
- Kaku in 2020
- Born: January 24, 1947 (age 79); San Jose, California, U.S.
- Education: Harvard University (BA); University of California, Berkeley (PhD)
- Known for: Light-cone string field theory Physics of the Impossible; Physics of the Future; The Future of the Mind; The God Equation
- Spouse: Shizue Kaku
- Children: 2
- Awards: Klopsteg Memorial Award (2008); Sir Arthur Clarke Lifetime Achievement Award (2021)
- Scientific career
- Fields: Theoretical physics
- Workplaces: City College of New York; New York University; Princeton University; Institute for Advanced Study
- Thesis: Spin and Unitarity in Dual Resonance Models (1972)
- Doctoral advisor: Stanley Mandelstam; Robert Pound
- Website: mkaku.org

Michio Kaku (/ˈmiːtʃioʊ ˈkɑːkuː/; born January 24, 1947) is an American theoretical physicist, science communicator, futurologist, and writer of popular science. He is a professor of theoretical physics at the City College of New York and the CUNY Graduate Center. Kaku is the author of several books about physics and related topics and has made frequent appearances on radio, television, and film. He is also a regular contributor to his own blog, as well as other popular media outlets. For his efforts to bridge science and science fiction, he is a 2021 Sir Arthur Clarke Lifetime Achievement Awardee.

His books Physics of the Impossible (2008), Physics of the Future (2011), The Future of the Mind (2014), and The God Equation: The Quest for a Theory of Everything (2021) became New York Times best sellers. Kaku has hosted several television specials for the BBC, the Discovery Channel, the History Channel, and the Science Channel.

== Early life and education ==
Kaku was born in 1947 in San Jose, California. His parents were both second-generation Japanese-Americans. According to Kaku, his grandfather came to the United States to participate in the cleanup operation after the 1906 San Francisco earthquake, and his father and mother were both born in California. Both his parents were interned in the Tule Lake War Relocation Center during World War II, where they met and where his elder brother was born.

According to Kaku, he was inspired to pursue a career in physics after seeing a photograph of Albert Einstein's desk at the time of his death. Kaku was fascinated to learn that Einstein had been unable to complete his unified field theory and resolved to dedicate his life to solving this theory. For a high school science fair, Kaku built a 2.3 MeV "atom smasher" in his parents' garage. Using scrap metal and 22 miles (35 km) of wire, the device was powerful enough to produce antimatter. It was at this National Science Fair in Albuquerque, New Mexico, that he attracted the attention of physicist Edward Teller, who took Kaku as a protégé, awarding him the Hertz Engineering Scholarship.

Kaku attended Harvard College, where he was a resident of Leverett House, and graduated summa cum laude in 1968 as the first in his physics class. He attended the Berkeley Radiation Laboratory at the University of California, Berkeley, receiving a PhD and holding a lectureship at Princeton University in 1972.

In 1968, during the Vietnam War, Kaku, who was about to be drafted, joined the United States Army, remaining until 1970. He completed his basic training at Fort Benning, Georgia, and advanced infantry training at Fort Lewis, Washington. However, he was never deployed to Vietnam.

== Academic career ==
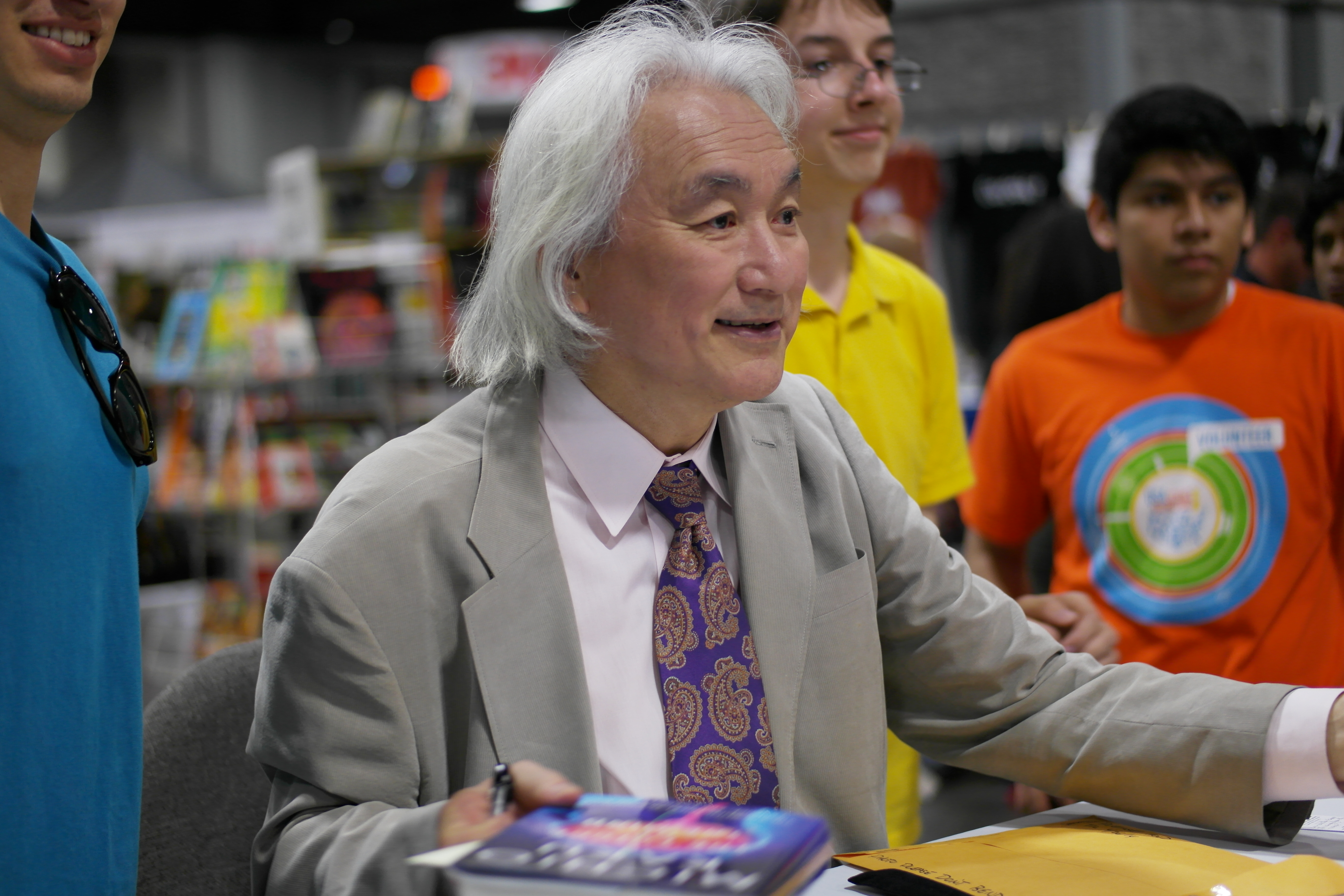
Kaku at the USA science and engineering festival 2014 at Walter E Washington Convention Center, DC

As part of the research program in 1975 and 1977 at the department of physics at the City College of the City University of New York, Kaku worked on research on quantum mechanics. He was a Visitor and Member (1973 and 1990) at the Institute for Advanced Study in Princeton and New York University. As of 2024, he holds the Henry Semat Chair and Professorship in theoretical physics at the City College of New York.

Between 1970 and 2000, Kaku had papers published in physics journals covering topics such as superstring theory, supergravity, supersymmetry, and hadronic physics. In 1974, Kaku and Prof. Keiji Kikkawa of Osaka University co-authored the first papers describing string theory in a field form.

Kaku is the author of several textbooks on string theory and quantum field theory. An explicit description of the second-quantization of the light-cone string was given by Kaku and Keiji Kikkawa.

== Popular science ==
Kaku is most widely known as a popularizer of science and physics outreach specialist. He has written books and appeared on many television programs as well as film. He also hosts a weekly radio program.

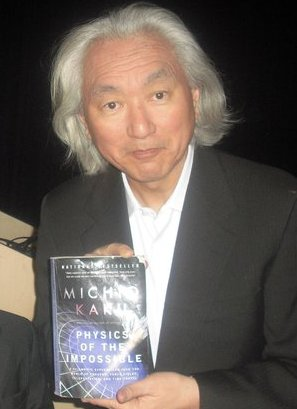
Kaku with his book Physics of the Impossible

=== Radio ===
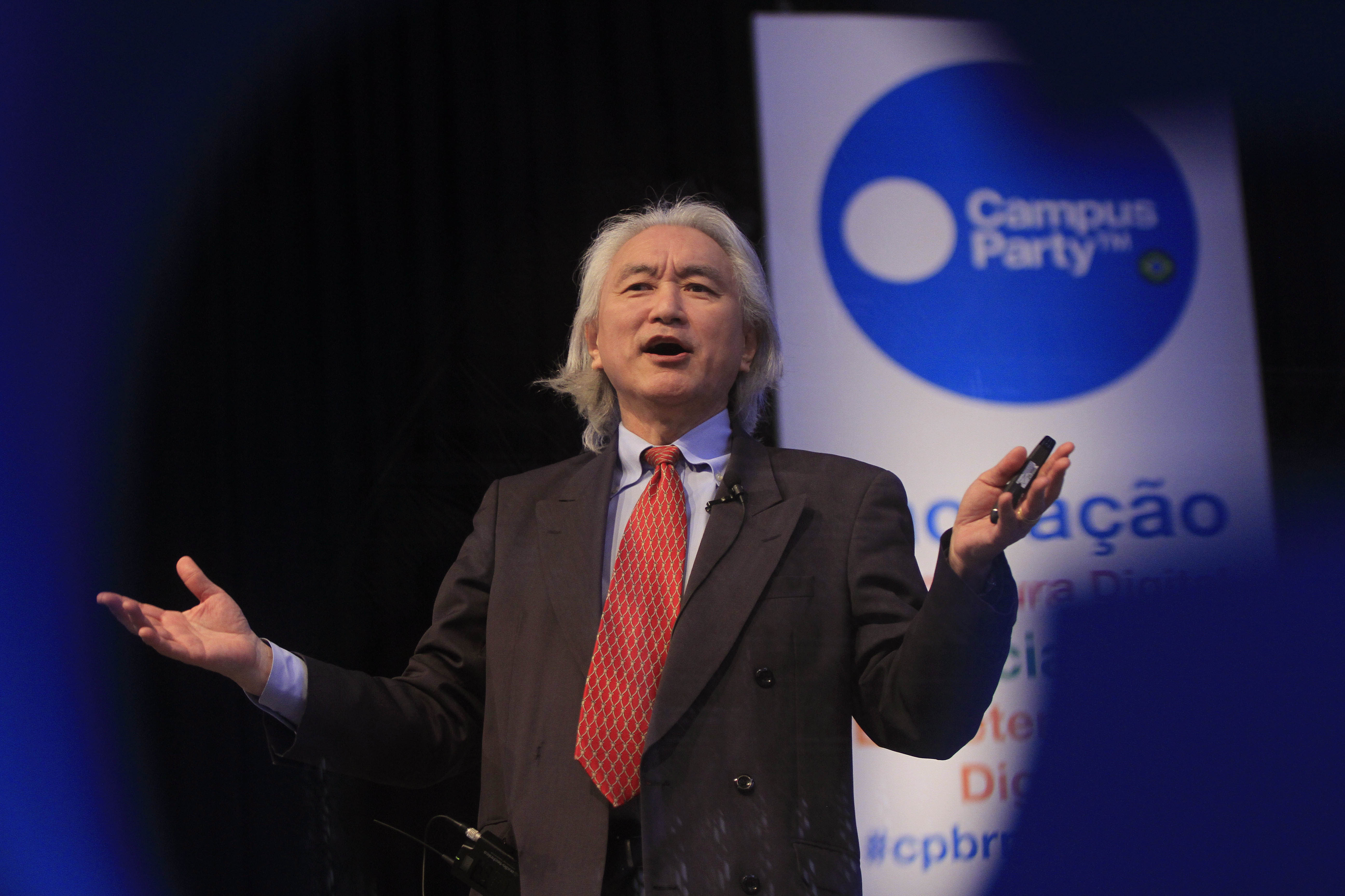
Kaku at a public event "Campus Party Brazil"

Kaku is the host of the weekly one-hour radio program Exploration, produced by the Pacifica Foundation's WBAI in New York. Exploration is syndicated to community and independent radio stations and makes previous broadcasts available on the program's website. Kaku defines the show as dealing with the general topics of science, war, peace, and the environment.

In April 2006, Kaku began broadcasting Science Fantastic on 90 commercial radio stations in the United States. It is syndicated by Talk Radio Network and now reaches 130 radio stations and America's Talk on XM and was the only nationally syndicated science radio program. When Kaku is busy filming for television, Science Fantastic goes on hiatus, sometimes for several months.

Kaku is also a frequent guest on many programs. As a guest on the program Coast to Coast AM on November 30, 2007, he reaffirmed his belief that the existence of extraterrestrial life is a certainty.

=== Television and film ===
Kaku has appeared in many forms of media and on many programs and networks, including Good Morning America, The Screen Savers, Larry King Live, 60 Minutes, Imus In The Morning, Nightline, 20/20, Naked Science, CNN, ABC News, CBS News, NBC News, Al Jazeera English, Fox News Channel, The History Channel, Conan, The Science Channel, The Discovery Channel, TLC, Countdown with Keith Olbermann, The Colbert Report, The Art Bell Show and its successor, Coast to Coast AM, BBC World News America, The Covino & Rich Show, Head Rush, Late Show with David Letterman, the Joe Rogan Experience, and Real Time with Bill Maher.

In February 2006, Kaku appeared as presenter in the BBC-TV four-part documentary Time which discussed the nature of time.

On January 28, 2007, Kaku hosted the Discovery Channel series 2057. This three-hour program discussed how medicine, cities, and energy could change over the next 50 years.

In 2008, Kaku hosted the three-hour BBC-TV documentary Visions of the Future, on the future of computers, medicine, and quantum physics, and he appeared in several episodes of the History Channel's Universe and Ancient Aliens series.

On December 1, 2009, he began hosting a 12-episode weekly television series for the Science Channel at 10 pm, called Sci Fi Science: Physics of the Impossible, based on the book of the same name. Each 30-minute episode discusses the scientific basis behind imaginative schemes, such as time travel, parallel universes, warp drive, and similar. Each episode includes interviews with other scientists working on prototypes of these technologies, interviews with science fiction fans, and clips from relevant science fiction movies.

In January 2007, Kaku visited Oman. While there, he talked at length to select members of that country's decision makers. In an interview with local media, Kaku elaborated on his vision of the future of humans. Kaku considers climate change and terrorism as serious threats in human evolution from a Type 0 civilization to Type 1 on the Kardashev scale.

== Policy advocacy and activism ==
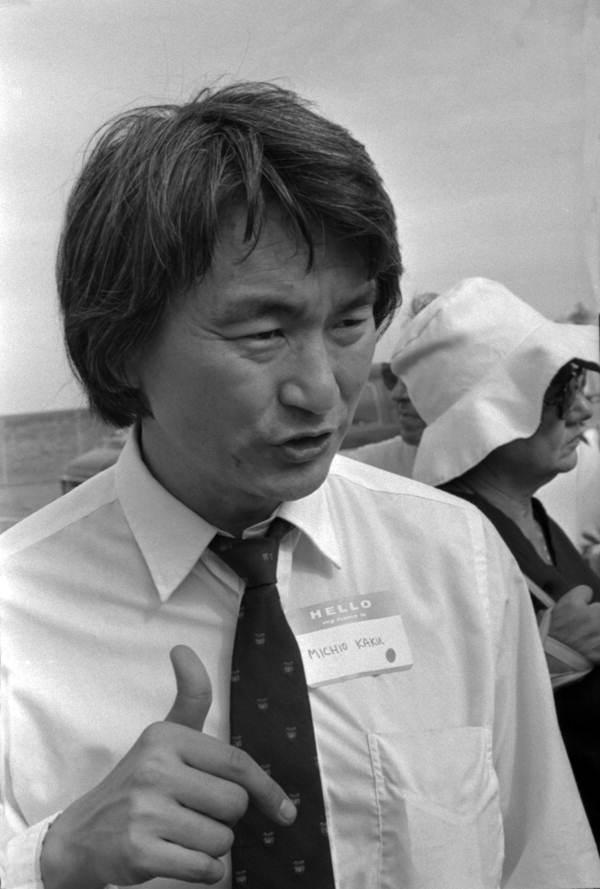
Kaku, protesting at Cape Canaveral demonstration, 1987

Kaku has publicly stated his concerns over matters including people denying the anthropogenic cause of global warming, nuclear armament, nuclear power, and what he believes to be the general misuse of science. He was critical of the Cassini–Huygens space probe because of the 72 pounds (33 kg) of plutonium contained in the craft for use by its radioisotope thermoelectric generator. Conscious of the possibility of casualties if the probe's fuel were dispersed into the environment during a malfunction and crash as the probe was making a "sling-shot" maneuver around Earth, Kaku publicly criticized NASA's risk assessment. He has spoken on the dangers of space junk and called for more and better monitoring. Kaku is generally a vigorous supporter of the exploration of space, believing that the ultimate destiny of the human race may lie in extrasolar planets, but he is critical of some of the cost-ineffective missions and methods of NASA.

Kaku credits his anti–nuclear war position to information he learned via programs he heard on the Pacifica Radio network during his student years in California. It was during this period that he made the decision to turn away from a career developing the next generation of nuclear weapons in association with his mentor, Edward Teller, and instead focused on research, teaching, writing, and accepting media opportunities to educate.

Kaku was a board member of Peace Action and of radio station WBAI-FM in New York City, where he originated his long-running program, Exploration, that focuses on the issues of science, war, peace, and the environment.

His remark from an interview in support of SETI, "We could be in the middle of an intergalactic conversation... and we wouldn't even know", is used in the third Symphony of Science installment "Our Place in the Cosmos". Kaku is also a member of the CuriosityStream advisory board.

== Personal life ==
Kaku has been married twice. He has two daughters. He is currently married to Shizue Kaku.

He enjoys figure skating as a recreational hobby.

== Books ==
Kaku is the author of various popular science books:

- Kaku, Michio; Trainer, Jennifer, eds. (1982). Nuclear Power: Both Sides. New York: Norton. ISBN 0-393-01631-5.
- Kaku, Michio; Jennifer Trainer Thompson (1987). Beyond Einstein: Superstrings and the Quest for the Final Theory. Oxford: Oxford University Press. ISBN 0-19-286196-4.
- Kaku, Michio; Daniel Axelrod (1987). To Win a Nuclear War: The Pentagon's Secret War Plans. Boston: South End Press. ISBN 0-89608-321-7.
- Kaku, Michio (1993). Quantum Field Theory: A Modern Introduction. New York: Oxford University Press. ISBN 0-19-507652-4.
- Kaku, Michio (1994). Hyperspace: A Scientific Odyssey Through Parallel Universes, Time Warps, and the Tenth Dimension. Oxford: Oxford University Press. ISBN 0-19-286189-1.
- Kaku, Michio (1998). Visions: How Science Will Revolutionize the 21st Century. New York: Oxford University Press. ISBN 0-19-288018-7.
- Kaku, Michio (1999). Introduction to Superstrings and M-Theory. New York: Springer. ISBN 0-387-98589-1.
- Kaku, Michio (1999). Strings, Conformal Fields, and M-Theory. New York: Springer. ISBN 0-387-98892-0.
- Kaku, Michio (2004). Einstein's Cosmos: How Albert Einstein's Vision Transformed Our Understanding of Space and Time. London: Weidenfeld & Nicolson. ISBN 0-297-84755-4.
- Kaku, Michio (2004). Parallel Worlds: The Science of Alternative Universes and Our Future in the Cosmos. London: Allen Lane. ISBN 0-7139-9728-1.
- Kaku, Michio (2008). Physics of the Impossible. New York: Doubleday. ISBN 978-0-385-52069-0.
- Kaku, Michio (2011). Physics of the Future: How Science will Shape Human Destiny and our Daily Lives by the Year 2100. New York: Doubleday. LCCN 2010026569.
- Kaku, Michio (2014). The Future of the Mind: The Scientific Quest to Understand, Enhance, and Empower the Mind. New York: Doubleday. ISBN 978-0385530828.
- Kaku, Michio (2018). The Future of Humanity: Terraforming Mars, Interstellar Travel, Immortality, and Our Destiny Beyond Earth. New York: Doubleday. ISBN 978-0385542760.
- Kaku, Michio (2021). The God Equation: The Quest for a Theory of Everything. New York: Doubleday. ISBN 978-0385542746.
- Kaku, Michio (2023). Quantum Supremacy: How the Quantum Computer Revolution Will Change Everything. Doubleday. ISBN 9780593744239

Hyperspace was a bestseller and voted one of the best science books of the year by The New York Times and The Washington Post. Parallel Worlds was a finalist for the Samuel Johnson Prize for nonfiction in the UK.

== Filmography ==
- We Are the Guinea Pigs (1980)
- Borders (1989)
- Synthetic Pleasures (1995)
- Einstein Revealed (1996)
- Future Fantastic (1996)
- Stephen Hawking's Universe (1997)
- Bioperfection: Building a New Human Race (1998)
- Me & Isaac Newton (1999)
- Space: The Final Junkyard (1999)
- Ghosts: Caught on Tape (2000)
- Big Questions (2001)
- Parallel Universes (2001)
- Horizon: "Time travel" (2003)
- Robo Sapiens (2003)
- Brilliant Minds: Secret Of The Cosmos (2003)
- Nova: "The Elegant Universe" (2003)
- Hawking (2004)
- The Screen Savers (2004)
- Unscrewed with Martin Sargent (2004)
- Alien Planet (2005)
- ABC News "UFOs: Seeing Is Believing" (2005)
- HARDtalk Extra (2005)
- Last Days on Earth (2005)
- Obsessed & Scientific (2005)
- Horizon: "Einstein's Unfinished Symphony" (2005)
- Exodus Earth (2006)
- Time (2006)
- 2057 (2007)
- The Universe (2007)
- Futurecar (2007)
- Attack of the Show! (2007)
- Visions of the Future (2008)
- Horizon: "The President's Guide to Science" (2008)
- Stephen Hawking: Master of the Universe (2008)
- Horizon: "Who's Afraid of a Big Black Hole" (2009–2010)
- Sci Fi Science: Physics of the Impossible (2009–2010)
- Horizon: "What Happened Before the Big Bang?" (2010)
- GameTrailers TV With Geoff Keighley: "The Science of Games" (2010)
- How the Universe Works (2010–2014)
- Seeing Black Holes (2010)
- Prophets of Science Fiction (2011)
- Through the Wormhole (2011)
- Horizon: "What Happened Before the Big Bang?" (2011)
- The Science of Doctor Who (2012)
- Horizon: "The Hunt for Higgs" (2012)
- The Principle: "The Principle" (2014)
- Deep Time History (2016)
- Year Million: "Year Million" (2017)
- Life 2.0 (2020)
- Mars: One Day on the Red Planet (2020)
- America's Book of Secrets: "Doomsday Scenarios" (2021)
- Meltdown: Three Mile Island (2022)

== See also ==
- Anti-nuclear movement in the United States
- List of peace activists
- String field theory
