= The Future of Humanity =

2018 book by Michio Kaku

The Future of Humanity: Terraforming Mars, Interstellar Travel, Immortality, and Our Destiny Beyond Earth
- Hardcover edition
- Author: Michio Kaku
- Language: English
- Genre: Popular science
- Publisher: Doubleday
- Publication date: February 20, 2018
- Publication place: United States
- Media type: Print (hardcover)
- Pages: 339
- ISBN: 978-0385542760
- Preceded by: The Future of the Mind

The Future of Humanity: Terraforming Mars, Interstellar Travel, Immortality, and Our Destiny Beyond Earth is a popular science book by the futurist and physicist Michio Kaku. The book was initially published on February 20, 2018, by Doubleday. The book was on The New York Times Best Seller list for four weeks.

== Background ==
Kaku discusses the future and survival of the human species and discusses topics such as terraforming Mars and interstellar travel. Given that it may take centuries to reach the closest suns and exoplanets, Kaku also explores alternative paths to ensure the survival of humanity, including the possibility of genetic engineering and transferring human consciousness into non-biological machines.

== Reception ==
Kirkus Reviews described Kaku's views as "[a]lways optimistic" and that "Kaku delivers a fascinating and scattershot series of scenarios in which humans overcome current obstacles without violating natural laws to travel the universe."

The New York Times praised Kaku for being "adept at drawing from the lexicon of popular science fiction" and noted that "the strength of Kaku's writing is knowing which science fiction ideas are worth following".
