= Keiji Kikkawa =

Japanese physicist

- Born: 1 October 1935; Shimane Prefecture
- Died: 1 July 2013 (aged 77)
- Education: Tokyo Metropolitan University, University of Tokyo
- Awards: Nishina Memorial Prize (1988)
- Scientific career
- Fields: Theoretical physics
- Workplaces: Osaka University

Keiji Kikkawa (吉川 圭二, Kikkawa Keiji; October 01, 1935-July 01, 2013) was a Japanese theoretical physicist.

Kikkawa received his bachelor's degree from Tokyo Metropolitan University in 1959, and a PhD from the University of Tokyo in 1964. After that he conducted research at the University of Tokyo, the University of Rochester and the University of Wisconsin. From 1970 he was associate professor at City College of New York and from 1974 at the Osaka University. From 1979 he was professor at Hiroshima University. In 1983 he returned to Osaka University where he worked until 1993. Between 2000 and 2004 he was a professor at Kanagawa University.

Kikkawa is one of the pioneers of string theory, on which he worked since the late 1960s in collaboration with Bunji Sakita, Miguel Virasoro and Michio Kaku.

== Awards ==
He was awarded the Nishina Memorial Prize in 1988.
