= The Future of the Mind =

2014 book by Michio Kaku

The Future of the Mind: The Scientific Quest to Understand, Enhance, and Empower the Mind
- Hardcover edition
- Author: Michio Kaku
- Language: English
- Genre: Popular science
- Publisher: Doubleday
- Publication date: February 25, 2014
- Publication place: United States
- Media type: Print (hardcover)
- Pages: 400 pp.
- Awards: No.1 New York Times Bestseller
- ISBN: 978-0385530828
- Preceded by: Physics of the Future
- Followed by: The Future of Humanity

The Future of the Mind: The Scientific Quest to Understand, Enhance, and Empower the Mind is a popular science book by the futurist and physicist Michio Kaku. The book was initially published on February 25, 2014 by Doubleday.

In 2015 the book was translated into Hebrew.

== Overview ==
The book discusses various possibilities of advanced technology that can alter the brain and mind. Looking into things such as telepathy, telekinesis, consciousness, artificial intelligence, and transhumanism, the book covers a wide range of topics. In it, Kaku proposes a "spacetime theory of consciousness". Similarly to Ray Kurzweil, he believes the advances in silicon computing will serve our needs as opposed to producing a generation of robot overlords.

== Reception ==
On March 16, 2014, The Future of the Mind made number one on The New York Times Bestseller list.
