= Hyperspace (book) =

1994 book by Michio Kaku

Hyperspace: A Scientific Odyssey Through Parallel Universes, Time Warps, and the 10th Dimension
- Cover depicting the artist's 2D conception of a 3D face of a 4D Hypercube house upon a 3D landscape
- Author: Michio Kaku
- Language: English
- Genre: Popular science
- Publisher: Oxford University Press
- Publication date: 1994
- Publication place: United States
- Media type: Print (hardcover)
- ISBN: 0-19-286189-1
- LC Class: QC793.3.F5 K35 1994
- Preceded by: Beyond Einstein
- Followed by: Visions (book)

Hyperspace: A Scientific Odyssey Through Parallel Universes, Time Warps, and the 10th Dimension (1994, ISBN 0-19-286189-1) is a book by Michio Kaku, a theoretical physicist from the City College of New York. It focuses on Kaku's studies of higher dimensions referred to as hyperspace. The recurring theme of the book is that all four forces of the universe (the strong force, the weak force, electromagnetism, and gravity) become more coherent and their description simpler in higher dimensions.

== Summary ==
Michio Kaku tries to explain higher dimensions, first analyzing the history of higher dimensions of space and the struggle to unite quantum mechanics and general relativity in one theory. He then goes on to detail theories concerning the 2-D world, named "Flatland". The end of the book discusses such topics as wormholes, parallel universes and the fate of the universe.

== Contents ==
=== Part I Entering the Fifth Dimension ===
- Worlds Beyond Space and Time
- Mathematicians and Mystics
- The Man Who "Saw" the Fourth Dimension
- The Secret of Light: Vibrations in the Fifth Dimension

=== Part II Unification in Ten Dimensions ===
- Quantum Heresy
- Einstein's Revenge
- Superstrings
- Signals from the Tenth Dimension
- Before Creation

=== Part III Wormholes: Gateways to Another Universe? ===
- Black Holes and Parallel Universes
- To Build a Time Machine
- Colliding Universes

=== Part IV Masters of Hyperspace ===
- Beyond the Future.
- The Fate of Universe
- Conclusion further

== Reception ==
A 1994 review for the Los Angeles Times noted that the book is not written for physicists, but for the "lay people excited by the possibilities" of their discoveries, and that for them, it is a good fit.

Reviewing the book for The Observatory in 1996, Ian Crawford was quite negative; noting that he "was disappointed with this book". He criticized "low level of basic scholarship" visible in poor referencing standards, occasional if minor errors, and unwarranted "sweeping generalizations". He also noted that while the book author is acknowledged to be an expert on superstrings, he found the book discussion of this concept quite lacking.

A 2004 review in SF Signal praised the book for engaging, educational writing on an interesting topic, diluted by irrelevant biographical passages.

Michael Starks reviewing the book in 2016 was also more positive, calling it "a lovely book full of fascinating info on the evolution of physics and cosmology".
