= Until the End of Time =

Until the End of Time may refer to:

== Music ==
- Until the End of Time (Tupac Shakur album), 2001
  - "Until the End of Time" (Tupac Shakur song), the title song
- Until the End of Time (Opshop album), 2010
- "Until the End of Time" (Justin Timberlake and Beyoncé song), 2006
- "Until the End of Time" (Electronic song), 1996
- "Until the End of Time", a song by Foreigner from Mr. Moonlight
- "Until the End of Time", a song by Westlife, a B-side of the single "Swear It Again"

== Film and television ==
- Until the End of Time (film), a 2017 Algerian film
- Until the End of Time (telenovela), produced by Nicandro Díaz González for Televisa in 2014

== Books ==
- Until the End of Time, a 2020 book by Brian Greene

== See also ==
- Till the End of Time (disambiguation)
