= Sarah Shandera =

American physicist and academic

- Education: Cornell University (Ph.D., 2006) University of Arizona (B.S., 2001)
- Scientific career
- Fields: Physics
- Workplaces: The Pennsylvania State University (2011-present)
- Thesis: Brane Inflation: Mechanisms and Observational Status
- Doctoral advisor: Sze-Hoi Henry Tye

Sarah Shandera is a physicist and a professor at the Pennsylvania State University. Her research focuses on using quantum systems, quantum information, and out-of-equilibrium systems as tools to study gravity and cosmology. She served as a member of the Executive Team of the next generation ground-based Cosmic microwave background experiment, CMB S-4 collaboration.

== Education ==
She is from Montana and attended Billings Central Catholic High School. Shandera received her Bachelor of Science in Mathematics and Physics at The University of Arizona in 2001 and earned her Ph.D. in Physics at Cornell University in 2006. She was a postdoctoral research assistant at the Institute for Strings, Cosmology, and Astroparticle Physics at Columbia University from 2006 to 2009 and a postdoctoral researcher at the Perimeter Institute for Theoretical Physics from 2009 to 2011.

== Research and career ==
Shandera joined The Pennsylvania State University as an Assistant Professor of Physics in 2011 and became an associate professor there in 2018. In 2021, she became the Director of the Institute for Gravitation and the Cosmos. She was promoted to professor in 2024. Her research is mostly theoretical in the areas of gravitational physics, cosmology, and particle physics. Shandera studies the dynamical laws and matter content of the universe to determine its evolution, focused particularly on the earliest times and highest energies of the universe. Much of her current work focuses on the intersection of quantum systems, quantum information, and out-of-equilibrium systems with gravity and cosmology. She was a member of the Executive Team of the next generation ground-based cosmic microwave background experiment, the CMB-S4 collaboration. Federal support for CMB-S4 was withdrawn on July 9, 2025.

== Honors ==
- Gordon and Betty Moore Foundation Fundamental Physics Innovation Convening Award (2020)
- C.I. Noll Award for Excellence in Teaching (2019)
- Visiting Fellow, Perimeter Institute (January 1, 2016 – present)
- Emmy Noether Visiting Fellow, Perimeter Institute (August 2015 – December 2015)
- Robinson-Appel Humanitarian Award (2005)
