= Psychopharmacology (journal) =

- Discipline: Psychopharmacology
- Language: English

Publication details
- Former name: Psychopharmacologia
- Publisher: Springer Science+Business Media (59-present)
- Frequency: Biweekly
- Open access: Hybrid
- Impact factor: 3.4 (2022)

Standard abbreviations
- ISO 4: Psychopharmacology
- NLM: Psychopharmacology (Berl)

Indexing
- ISSN: 0033-3158 (print); 1432-2072 (web)
- OCLC no.: 2409222

Links
- Journal homepage

Psychopharmacology is an international, peer-reviewed scientific journal covering the field of psychopharmacology. It is the official journal of the European Behavioural Pharmacology Society and is published by Springer Science+Business Media. The current Coordinating editors of the journal are Trevor Robbins, Christelle Baunez, and Patricia Janak.

== History ==
The first issue of the journal was published in 1959.
