= David Hickman (producer) =

David Hickman has been writing, producing and directing single documentaries and series for broadcast television in the United Kingdom and internationally for the last twenty years. He is also a cinematographer, having worked on 16- and 35-mm film, as well as a variety of video and HD formats – shooting drama and non-fiction.

== Early films and prizes ==
As producer of the Errol Morris-directed A Brief History of Time (Triton/Paramount Pictures), he won the Grand Jury Prize at the Sundance Film Festival in 1992, and the film (released theatrically worldwide) was judged one the ten best movies of the year by, among others, Time and the Los Angeles Times. More recently he directed and series produced the Emmy Award-winning The Elegant Universe, adapted from Brian Greene's bestselling book for Nova/WGBH in the US and Channel.

== Recent documentaries ==
Since joining the University of York's Theater, Film and Television department in 2009, Hickman has completed Race and Intelligence: Science's Last Taboo, a feature-length documentary for Channel 4, which won the prestigious Grierson Award in 2010 for best science documentary, and three films for the Al Jazeera series Slavery: A 21st Century Evil (2011), which was nominated for an IDA (International Documentary Association). He produced, directed and photographed both productions.

As well as Stephen Hawking and Brian Greene, Hickman has worked with onscreen talents including the Pulitzer Prize-winning author and journalist Thomas Friedman (a feature-length documentary entitled Green: The New Red White And Blue), the IVF pioneer Robert Winston (Superhuman, BBC1 & Discovery), and the American actor and producer Danny Glover (Great Railway Journeys, BBC2 & PBS).

Hickman has also been privileged to work with some of the finest production and post-production talent around: the Academy Award-winning director Errol Morris (who won an Academy Award for The Fog of War), cinematographers John Bailey, ASC (whose critically acclaimed cinematography on films like Mishima and American Gigolo has been deeply influential), Lance Gewer (who photographed the Academy Award-winning Tsotsi) Robefrt Chappell (The Thin Blue Line; The Fog of War) and Stefan Czapsky (best known for his photographing Tim Burton's Edward Scissorhands and Ed Wood), editors Brad Fuller (Gary Oldman's Nil by Mouth and Tom Swartwout (who edited the legendary director Sydney Lumet's last film, Before the Devil Knows You're Dead), composers Philip Glass (Mishima; The Hours) and Asche and Spencer (Monster's Ball) re-recording mixer and sound designer Randy Thom (the Harry Potter films), and sound recordist Peter Handford (a regular on Alfred Hitchcock's 'British' movies, as well as The Go-Between, Out of Africa, Frenzy and Heaven's Gate).

== University role ==
In the Department of Theater, Film and Television, Hickman is director of graduate studies, as well as programme director of the MA in Digital Film and Television Production. He also oversees the PhD programme, which includes PhD by Creative Practice. He teaches on the BSc in film and television production, the BA in writing, directing and performance, and presently contributes to undergraduate and postgraduate degree programs in the Center for Applied Human Rights at York.

Hickman is also dean of Vanbrugh College, one of eight colleges at the university.

He continues to work as a producer, director, writer and cinematographer.
