= AL and AL =

British filmmakers and visual artists

Al Holmes and Al Taylor
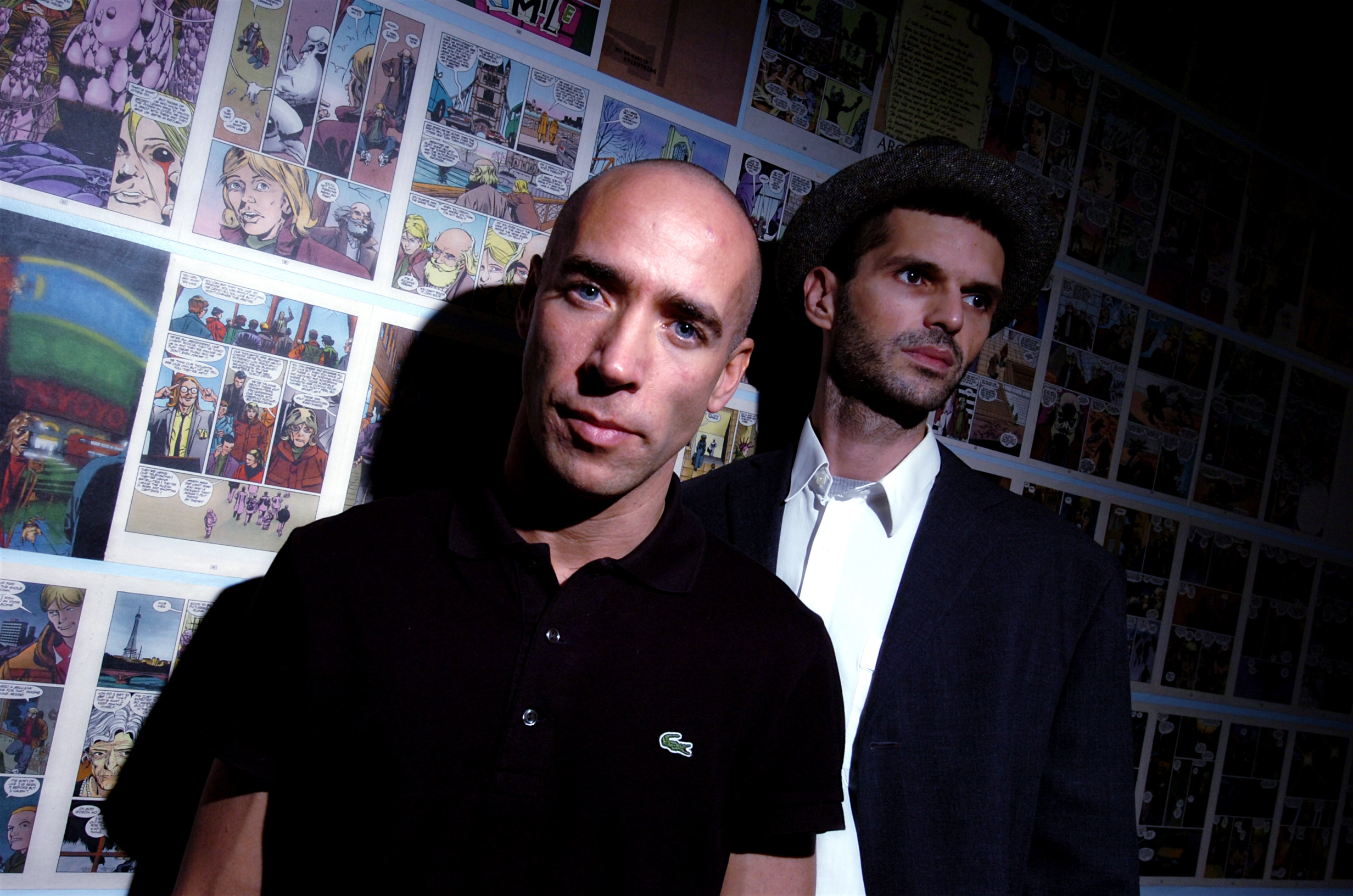
- Born: Alan James Edwards Holmes; Alan James Edwards Taylor; Manchester, UK

Al Holmes and Al Taylor, also known as AL and AL, are British filmmakers and visual artists. Known for their surrealist films, they combine live action performance with computer generated environments to create dream worlds in film. Since 2001 the duo have created an award-winning body of short films commissioned by Abandon Normal Devices, Animate, Arts Council England, British Film Institute, Channel 4 television, Cornerhouse Cinema, Foundation for Art and Creative Technology, Film London, Museum of Modern Art, Antwerp, Southbank Centre and the World Science Festival, exhibiting internationally in galleries, site specific installations, film festivals, television and concert halls.

Al Holmes spent his early youth with his inventor and engineer grandfather in his workshop as he attempted to invent, amongst other things, a perpetual motion device. Coincidentally, Al Holmes’ grandfather had invented an automatic pie machine for Al Taylor’s grandfather, who was a prize-winning baker. After high school Al Taylor studied photography then worked in the fashion industry with photographers such as Steven Klein, David Simms, Richard Avedon and Bruce Weber. After leaving the fashion industry, he studied screen writing. Al Holmes studied theology and mysticism whilst training for the priesthood at Osterley Seminary London. Spending time in a silent monastery in Montserrat. They share the same first three names Alan James Edwards. Their collective name was born at a party at the actress Rachel Weisz’s house. Still in character from the play she had just performed, The Shape of Things, Rachel shortened their names to Al and Al. It has stuck ever since. Coincidentally, Al and Al's fathers also shared the same name, and died on the same date.

Al and Al met in a chance encounter whilst visiting Derek Jarman’s Garden in Dungeness and after studying fine art at Central Saint Martins in London, they began making films together.

== History ==
=== 2001-2009 ===
After graduating from Central Saint Martins, Al and Al were awarded the first base award from the arts organisation ACAVA in 2001. The following year ACME awarded the duo a residency in the Sugar House Studio. Al and Al transformed the warehouse space into a blue screen special effects studio. London Artists Film and Video awarded the duo with a commission for the film Misty Machine 10. The film is an inertial journey through the world wide web. The viewer rides their search engine in a quest to find bodies stripped and ready for intimacy. In this coded space, erotic contact becomes an onanistic hallucination and the body disappears into a mental universe of mediated masks. The film was shown internationally in film festivals and as part of gallery installations.

In 2003, Al and Al created the re-matte series, a collection of films where special effects have been erased from key blue screen features, leaving the original performances in the blue void of the special effects studio. These included Charlton Heston in The Ten Commandments and Sabu from The Thief of Bagdad. The next year, animate projects commissioned Perpetual Motion in the Land of Milk and Honey. The film simulates Al Holmes’ Grandfather Brown’s lifelong endeavour to create a perpetual motion device and supply free power for the people. During a telephone call with the Lamb of God, Britney Spears sabotages the project and sets in motion her own drive for infinity. The conflict produces a series of alchemical events which have only one consequence, a land flowing with milk and honey. Originally broadcast on channel 4 television, Perpetual Motion in the Land of Milk and Honey went on to screen in 50 countries in film festivals, was broadcast on Canal+ and featured in gallery installations, most notably as part of the Satellite of Love at the Witte de Witte in Rotterdam. Al and Al directed a video in 2005 for pop musician Andy Bell on his solo project Electric Blue. The duo were then invited by DARKLIGHT for the solo exhibition of the media festival in Dublin.

Animate projects commissioned their next short film, Interstellar Stella (2006); growing up inside the spectacle of perfect illusions, AL Taylor's eight-year-old niece has featured in over 72 modelling pictures. Interstellar Stella maps out a journey through her pictures in order to explore what it is to grow up living and working on both sides of the mediated glass. Looking through the mirror of technology. AL and AL stage a parallax narcissus and trace the origins of paparazzi. The film was originally broadcast on Channel 4, then screened in international festivals as well as gallery installations, most notably at the Foundation for Art and Creative Technology. The following year AL and AL were then invited by the Foundation for Art and Creative Technology to create a new film for their UK solo exhibition at the gallery. The duo moved their studio from Sugar House Studios into Edge Hill Station; the first passenger railway station in the world. Inspired by the historical and cultural significance of the site, Al and Al began transforming the buildings into a space for the arts with METAL culture. The studio was broken into, and 10 years of their archives were stolen. Without their film making equipment, the duo began working on a music project with the artist Philip McHugh, casting him as the character Winston Glory in their upcoming film Eternal Youth. They made their first studio album Dominator as part of the soundtrack for the film.

In 2008 the solo exhibition Eternal Youth formed a central part of the cultural celebrations of Liverpool’s status of European Capital of Culture. Including the trilogy of films which focus on mediated celebrity culture, Eternal Youth, as well as live blue screen installation Magic Carpet and the film I don’t want to leave my Island. As part of the exhibition Al and Al collaborated on their publication Eternal Youth with Grant Morrison the graphic novel writer of Batman and Superman and the novelist and mythographer Marina Warner who focused on the duos approach to dreams in their films; "AL and AL investigate the shaping forces of fantasy and reality. They both create dream worlds and stand back in their art to draw attention to their power over us, plunging the spectator into a virtual world of dizzy dimensions." Grant Morrison described the filmmakers work, "AL and AL's work evokes memories for me of Jerry Cornelius stories, J. G. Ballard books, The Prisoner and my own best dreams.” The Eternal Youth exhibition toured to the National Art Museum of China as part of the Olympic Games celebrations. Al and Al were awarded the Liverpool Arts Prize for their Anaglyph Avatar series in 2009; a multi screen gallery installation of films viewed with 3D glasses. Originally commissioned by MuKHA, the Anaglpyh Avatar series included the film Pink Triangles which was made for the exhibition in Mechelen, the City where the trains for Auschwitz departed. The duo co-curated the exhibition with Edwin Carels which included work by Yves Klein, Charles Darwin and Anish Kapoor. Al and Al returned to Liverpool to curate and open Edge Hill Station as a gallery and space for the arts with an exhibition called XXX:Get off. A group exhibition including work by Al and Al, Kenneth Anger, Crystal DeBeers, Man Ray and Marcel Duchamp.

=== 2010-present ===
AL and AL collaborated with composer Philip Glass, physicist Brian Greene and playwright David Henry Hwang on Icarus at the Edge of Time in 2010. ABC news described the piece as a "multimedia masterpiece". The premiere of the Icarus film was introduced by Stephen Hawking at the Lincoln Center as the gala opening of the World Science Festival 2010 in New York and was performed with a 65 piece symphony orchestra. The piece toured through numerous concert halls including Baltimore Symphony, Royal Festival Hall and the Guggenheim in New York. Channel 4 commissioned Al and Al to direct a trilogy of shorts called Superstitious Robots for broadcast on television in 2011. In episode 01, "The Reading", during a tarot reading, a superstitious robot wonders if her whole life is preordained by mythical scenes foretold in the tarot deck. She is told she will receive a proposal of marriage from her lover. In episode 02, "The Dreaming", whilst recharging, a superstitious robot has an electrical dream about the archetypes in her tarot reading. In episode 03, "The Ring", over breakfast a superstitious robot receives the proposal of marriage from her girlfriend before going shopping for a Ring in a second hand jewellery shop. The next year Al and Al were commissioned by Cornerhouse and Abandon Normal Devices Festival to create their next film The Creator, a 45minute piece based on the life of the mathematician and genius code breaker Alan Turing. The Creator takes the viewer into the surreal dream world of the visionary scientist and seed of Thinking Machines. Through Turing’s dream diaries the Thinking Machines from the future embark on a quest to discover their origins and destiny in the Universe. The Creator premiered at the Museum of the Moving Image in New York City.

== Short films ==
| Year | Film |
|---|---|
| 2012 | The Creator |
| 2011 | Superstitious Robots: 01 The Reading |
| 2011 | Superstitious Robots: 02 The Dreaming |
| 2011 | Superstitious Robots: 03 The Ring |
| 2010 | Icarus at the Edge of Time |
| 2009 | Pink Triangles |
| 2009 | Chrome Home |
| 2009 | Square Eyes |
| 2009 | I killed thousands of people last night and these are all the weapons I used |
| 2008 | Eternal Youth |
| 2006 | Interstellar Stella |
| 2005 | Electric Blue |
| 2004 | Perpetual Motion in the Land of Milk and Honey |
| 2003 | Blue Screen Genie |
| 2003 | Blue Screen Exodus |
| 2003 | Misty Machine 10 / Hard Drive |
| 2003 | Pre Cast: Searching |
| 2003 | Pre Cast: Pointing |
| 2003 | Pre Cast: Measuring |
| 2003 | Pre Cast: Walking |
| 2002 | Fore Cast |
| 2001 | Till Death do us Join |
| 2001 | Home Theatre |
| 2000 | Good Vibrations |
| 2000 | I don’t want to leave my Island |
| 2000 | To Be Rendered |

== Bibliography ==
- All That Is Solid Melts Into Air. 2009. MuKHA. ISBN 978-9020983180
- AL and AL. Eternal Youth. 2008. FACT. ISBN 978-1-84631-148-2
- Fan DI'AN & Zhang Ga. Synthetic Times. 2008. MIT. ISBN 978-0-262-51226-8
- Andrew Chong. Digital Animation. 2008. AVA. ISBN 978-2-940373-56-7
- Benjamin Cook and Gary Thomas. The animate! Book. 2006. LUX. ISBN 0-9548569-2-9
