= Kay Tye =

American neuroscientist (born c. 1981)

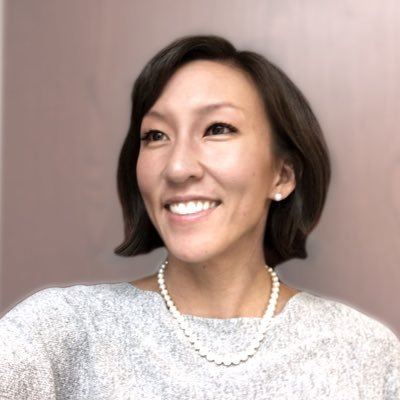
- Born: c. 1981 (age 44–45); United States
- Education: Massachusetts Institute of Technology; University of California, San Francisco
- Known for: Optogenetics
- Awards: Donald B. Lindsley Prize in Behavioral Neuroscience, Harold M. Weintraub Graduate Student Award
- Scientific career
- Fields: Neuroscience
- Workplaces: Stanford University; Massachusetts Institute of Technology; Salk Institute for Biological Studies
- Doctoral advisor: Patricia Janak

Kay M. Tye (born c. 1981) is an American neuroscientist and professor and Wylie Vale Chair in the Salk Institute for Biological Sciences. Her research has focused on using optogenetics to identify connections in the brain that are involved in innate emotion, motivation and social behaviors.

== Early life and education ==
Tye was raised in Ithaca, New York, where both of her parents worked at Cornell University. Her parents Henry Tye and Bik Kwoon Tye had emigrated from Hong Kong. As a child, Tye worked in her mother's laboratory organizing pipette tips. She completed a Bachelor of Science with a major in cognitive science at the Massachusetts Institute of Technology (MIT) from 1999 to 2003. After graduating, she spent time learning breakdancing and backpacked around Australia for a year before returning to the University of California, San Francisco (UCSF), to begin her graduate studies in neuroscience. She joined the laboratory of neurobiologist Patricia Janak where she completed her thesis showing that neuronal activity was increased in a region of the brain associated with processing of emotions, called the amygdala, in rats learning to associate a stimulus with a reward. Her thesis work was published in Nature and won the Donald B. Lindsley Prize in Behavioral Neuroscience and the Harold M. Weintraub Graduate Student Award. Tye received her PhD in 2008.

== Career and research ==
From 2008 to 2009, Tye worked as a post-doctoral research fellow at the UCSF Ernest Gallo Clinic and Research Center and then at Stanford University from 2009 to 2011. At Stanford, she was mentored by Karl Deisseroth in optogenetics, a technique that uses light to activate or inhibit specific neurons.

Tye returned to MIT in 2012 as an assistant professor at the university's Picower Institute for Learning and Memory. Her research has focused on answering questions on how the same neural mechanism in the amygdala of the brain can regulate such different behavioral responses to negative and positive environmental cues. Using optogenetics to control neurons by modulating how they transmit signals in the brain, her work seeks to determine whether there are different neuronal networks in the amygdala that communicate with either the fear or reward circuits of the brain. Through this research, Tye and colleagues were able to identify distinct populations of neurons that have different functions, morphology and genetics and were able to confirm that these differences are associated with separate roles in processing information that leads to either positive or negative reinforcement. Her work has contributed to the understanding of social behaviors such as reward-seeking and anxiety, and provided insights into the basis of psychiatric diseases.

Her work has also looked at alcoholism and brain circuitry, where Tye led a team of researchers to identify how the brain is altered in mice that predicted increased levels of compulsive drinking. The work is suggested to lead to understanding as to why some people become addicted to alcohol, while others do not.

Tye received the NIH Director's New Innovator Award in 2013 and the NARSAD Young Investigator Award in 2014. In 2014, she was named one of MIT Technology Review's TR35 top innovators under the age 35 for her use of optogenetics in identifying neural circuits involved in anxiety and social interaction.

In November 2019, Tye gave a TED Talk at the National Academy of Sciences titled "What Investigating Neural Pathways Can Reveal About Mental Health".

== Publications ==
1. Siciliano, C.A., Noamany, H., Chang, C.J., Brown, A.R., Chen, X., Leible, D., Lee, J.J., Wang, J., Vernon, A.N., Vander Weele, C.M., Kimchi, E.Y., Heiman, M., Tye, K.M. A cortical-brainstem circuit predicts and governs compulsive alcohol drinking. (2019) Science. 366(6468):1008-1012. DOI: 10.1126/science.aay1186
2. Neural mechanisms of social homeostasis. Matthews GA & Tye KM. Ann N Y Acad Sci. 2019 Mar 15. DOI: 10.1111/nyas.14016

== Awards and honors ==
- Howard Hughes Medical Institute Investigator (2021)
- Blavatnik National Award Laureate for Young Scientists (2021)
- NIMH MERIT Award (2021-2031)
- Society for Neuroscience (SFN) Young Investigator Award (2016)
- Daniel X. Freedman Award (2016)
- Presidential Early Career Award for Scientists and Engineers (PECASE) (2016)
- New York Stem Cell Foundation – Robertson Investigator (2015–2019)
- McKnight Scholar Award (2015–2018)
- Harold E. Edgerton Faculty Achievement Award (2015)
- NIMH (2014–2018)
- Sloan Research Fellow, Alfred P. Sloan Foundation (2014–2015)
- NARSAD Young Investigator Award (2014–2015)
- TR35, Technology Review's Top 35 Innovators Under 35 (2014)
- ACNP Associate Member (2014)
- NIH Director's New Innovator Award (2013–2018)
- Klingenstein Foundation Award (2013–2015)
- Whitehead Career Development Professorship (2013–2015)
- Whitehall Foundation Award (2012–2014)
- Kavli Foundation Frontiers Fellow
- Jeptha H. and Emily V. Wade Award (2012)
- Stanford University Post-Doctoral Award (2010)
- NRSA Post-Doctoral Research Fellow (2009–2012)
- European Brain and Behavior Society Post-Doctoral Fellow Award (2009)
- Harold M. Weintraub Graduate Student Award (2009)
- Donald B. Lindsley Prize (2009)
- NSF Graduate Research Fellow (2005–2008)
