= Gary Shiu =

American theoretical physicist

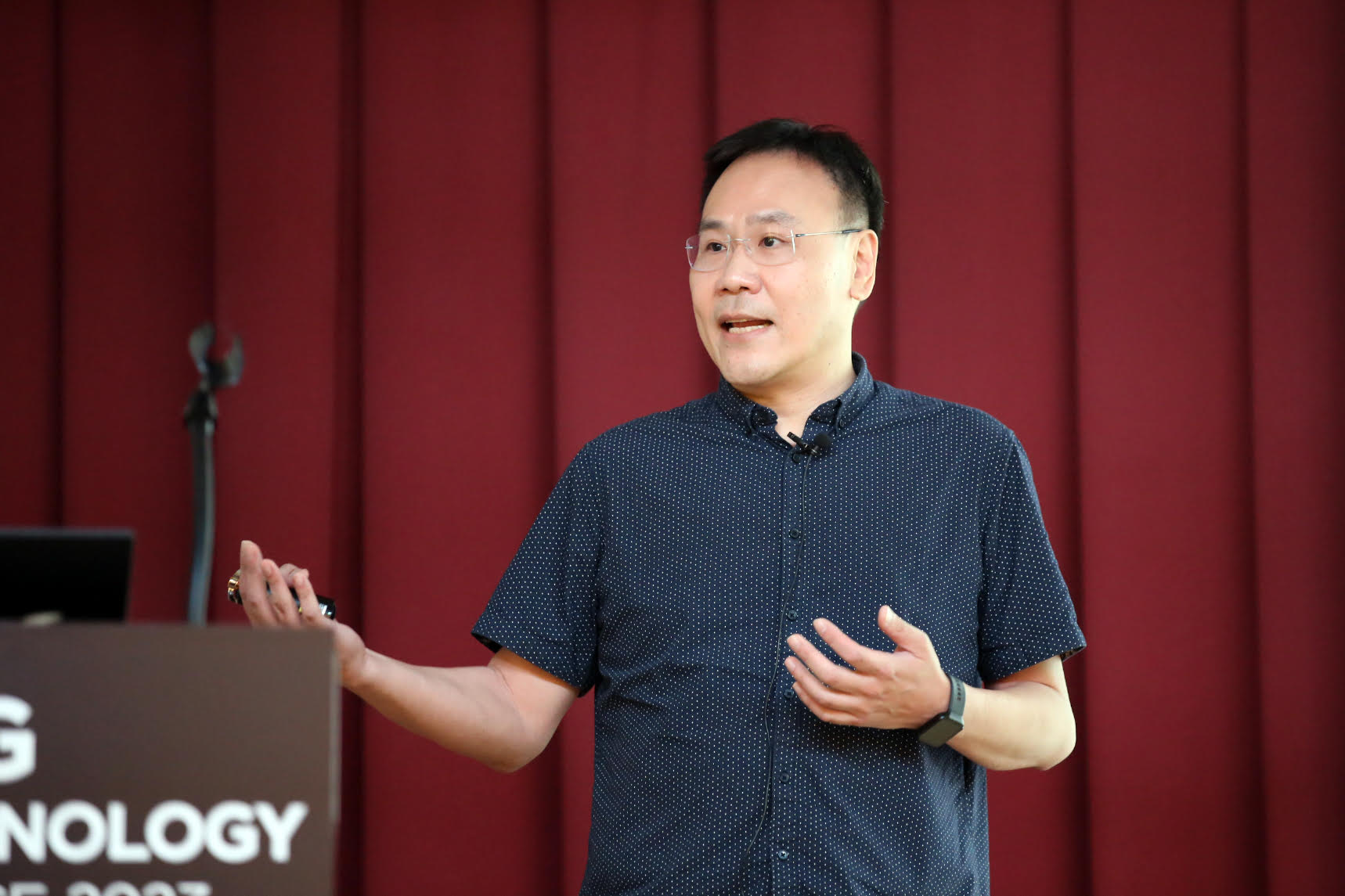
- Education: Ph.D
- Alma mater: Cornell University, Chinese University of Hong Kong
- Scientific career
- Fields: String theory, particle physics, high energy physics and cosmology
- Institutions: University of Wisconsin-Madison, Hong Kong University of Science and Technology, Hong Kong Institute for Advanced Study, University of Pennsylvania, C. N. Yang Institute for Theoretical Physics
- Doctoral advisor: Henry Tye

Chinese name
- Traditional Chinese: 蕭文禮
- Simplified Chinese: 萧文礼
Transcriptions
Standard Mandarin
- Hanyu Pinyin: Xiāo Wénlǐ
Yue: Cantonese
- Jyutping: Siu^{1} Man^{4}lai^{5}
- Website: shiu.physics.wisc.edu

Gary Shiu (Chinese: 蕭文禮) is a Chinese-American theoretical physicist who is the Paul Dirac Professor of Physics at the University of Wisconsin-Madison. His research spans cosmology, particle physics, and string theory. He has made significant contributions to both fundamental and phenomenological aspects of string theory. He is well known for his work in constructing models of particle physics and cosmology from string theory, and in elucidating experimental and observational consequences of fundamental physics. He brought string theory research to the University of Wisconsin-Madison and was involved in the founding of the Theoretical and Computational Cosmology Group and the AI ∩ Universe Initiative.

== Education ==
Gary Shiu received his primary and secondary school education at St Joseph's College. He received a bachelor's of science in physics from the Chinese University of Hong Kong in 1993 and a Ph.D. from Cornell University in 1998 under advisor Henry Tye.

== Career ==
He conducted postdoctoral research work at C. N. Yang Institute for Theoretical Physics and subsequently at the University of Pennsylvania before joining the faculty of the University of Wisconsin-Madison in the United States. He was a senior fellow at the Hong Kong Institute for Advanced Study and the founding director of the Center for Fundamental Physics and concurrently chair professor of physics at the Hong Kong University of Science and Technology in Hong Kong.

He has held visiting professorships at the Perimeter Institute for Theoretical Physics, Stanford University, University of Amsterdam, and the Kavli Institute for the Physics and Mathematics of the Universe. Shiu has given numerous lectures worldwide, both at a technical level and for the general public, including BEL Lectures, Steve Goldman Lectures in Mathematical Physics, Nico van Kampen Colloquium, Johannes Diderik van der Waals Lectures, Zi-Ping Distinguished Lectures in Theoretical Physics, Colloquium Ehrenfestii, and Kavli Frontiers of Science Symposium, among others. He was an invited speaker of the inaugural International Congress of Basic Science in 2023.

== Awards ==
- 2003: Research Innovation Award, Research Corporation
- 2004: NSF Career Award
- 2005: Cottrell Scholar Award
- 2006: Kavli Frontiers Fellow, National Academy of Sciences
- 2008: Guggenheim Fellow
- 2008: Vilas Associate Award
- 2009: Ambrose Monell Foundation Fellow, Institute for Advanced Study
- 2011: Fellow, American Physical Society
- 2012: Johannes Diderik van der Waals Chair, University of Amsterdam
- 2012: University of Wisconsin Chancellor's Distinguished Teaching Award
- 2012: Fellow, Institute of Physics, UK
- 2015: Fellow, American Association for the Advancement of Science
- 2016: Kellett Mid-Career Award, University of Wisconsin
- 2026: Wisconsin Alumni Research Foundation (WARF) Named Professorship and named the Paul Dirac Professor of Physics

== Selected publications ==
- Chen, Xingang; Huang, Min-xin; Kachru, Shamit; Shiu, Gary (2 January 2007). "Observational signatures and non-Gaussianities of general single-field inflation". Journal of Cosmology and Astroparticle Physics. 2007 (1): 2. arXiv:hep-th/0605045. doi:10.1088/1475-7516/2007/01/002. S2CID 392672.
- M. Uranga, Angel; Shiu, Gary; Cvetič, Mirjam (12 November 2001). "Chiral four-dimensional N=1 supersymmetric type IIA orientifolds from intersecting D6-branes". Nuclear Physics B. 615 (1–3): 3–32. arXiv:hep-th/0107166. doi:10.1016/S0550-3213(01)00427-8. S2CID 119423753.
- Blumenhagen, Ralph; Cvetič, Mirjam; Langacker, Paul; Shiu, Gary (2005). "Toward realistic intersecting D-brane models". Annual Review of Nuclear and Particle Science. 55 (71–139): 71–139. arXiv:hep-th/0502005. doi:10.1146/annurev.nucl.55.090704.151541.
- Ooguri, Hirosi; Palti, Eran; Shiu, Gary; Vafa, Cumrun (2019). "Distance and de Sitter Conjectures on the Swampland". Nuclear Physics B. 788: 180–184. arXiv:1810.05506. doi:10.1016/j.physletb.2018.11.018.
- Shiu, Gary; Tye, Sze-Hoi Henry (1998). "TeV scale superstring and extra dimensions". Physical Review D. 58 (10) 106007. arXiv:hep-th/9805157. doi:10.1103/PhysRevD.58.106007. S2CID 14103980.
