= Bik Kwoon Tye =

Chinese-American geneticist and biologist (born c. 1947)

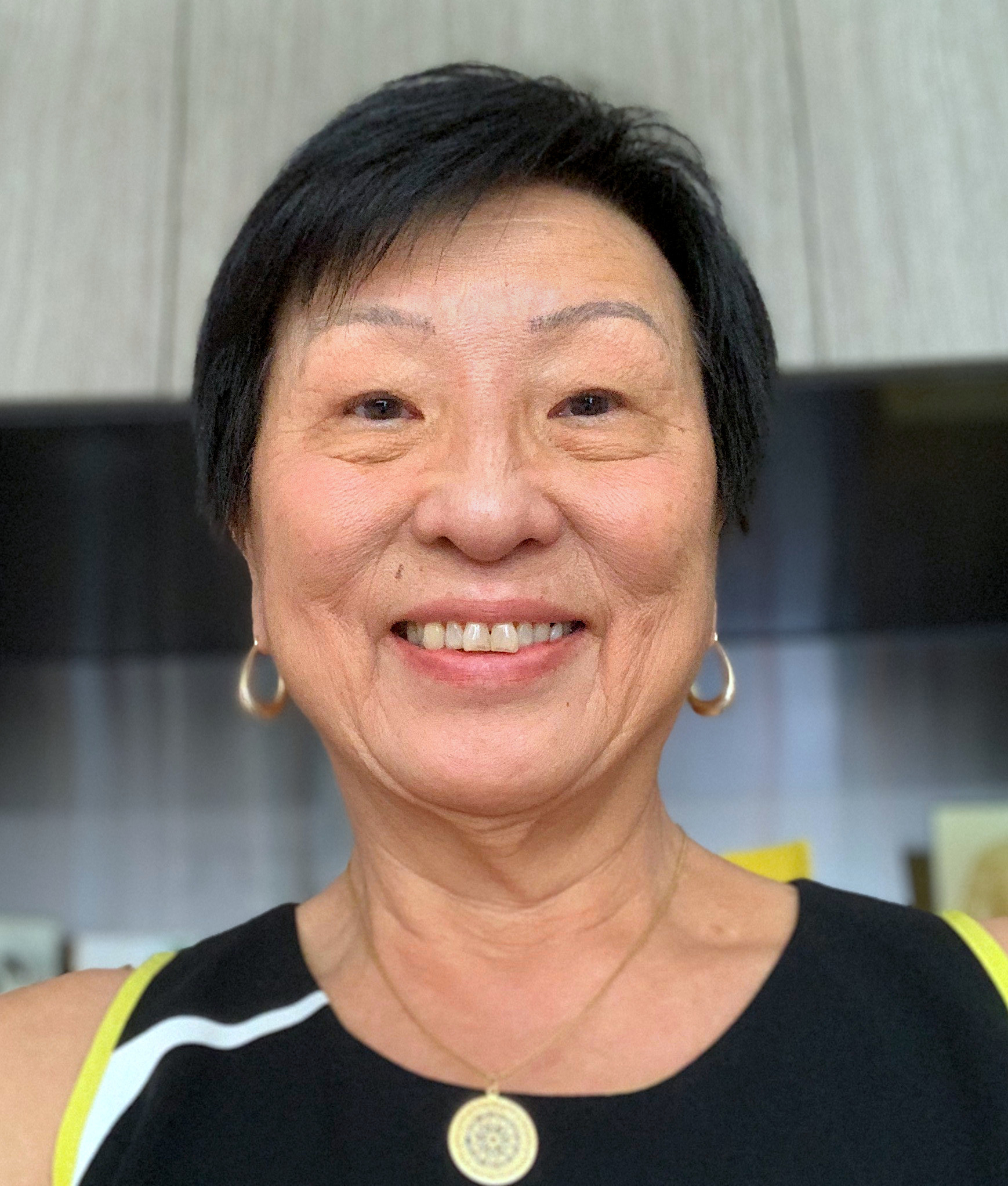
- Tye in 2021
- Education: Wellesley College (B.A) University of California, San Francisco (UCSF) (M.Sc.) Massachusetts Institute of Technology (Ph.D.)
- Known for: Okazaki fragment generation during aberrant DNA repair in E. coli, Minichromosome maintenance genes (MCM) in yeast, High-resolution structures of MCM complexes and origin recognition complex (ORC)
- Spouse: Henry Sze-Hoi Tye
- Children: 2
- Awards: Helen Hay Whitney Postdoctoral Research Fellowship (1974–1977). Elected to the National Academy of Sciences (2023).
- Scientific career
- Fields: Molecular Genetics, Structural Biology
- Workplaces: Cornell University, Hong Kong University of Science & Technology
- Doctoral advisor: David Botstein and Joel Huberman

Bik Kwoon Yeung Tye (Chinese: 戴楊碧瓘; born c. 1947) is a Chinese-American molecular geneticist and structural biologist. Tye's pioneering work on eukaryotic DNA replication led to the discovery of the minichromosome maintenance (MCM) genes in 1984, which encode the catalytic core of the eukaryotic replisome. Tye also determined the first high-resolution structures of both the MCM complex and the Origin Recognition Complex (ORC) in 2015 and 2018. Tye is currently a Professor Emeritus (2015) at Cornell University. She is married to Henry Sze-Hoi Tye and is the mother of Kay Tye and Lynne Tye.

== Early life and education ==
Tye was born and raised in Hong Kong where she attended St. Stephen's Girls’ College from kindergarten through high school. She then obtained a full scholarship to pursue undergraduate studies in chemistry at Wellesley College in Massachusetts, USA and graduated with a Bachelor of Arts in 1969. Upon graduation, Tye moved to California to complete an M.Sc. in biochemistry at the University of California San Francisco (UCSF) supervised by Cho Hao Li (李卓皓). Following her master's in 1971, Tye pursued Ph.D. training in genetics at the Massachusetts Institute of Technology under the joint mentorship of David Botstein and Joel Huberman. In 1974, Tye was awarded the Helen Hay Whitney Post-doctoral Research Fellowship with which she pursued further research training in molecular genetics under the supervision of Bob Lehman at Stanford University until 1977. Her post-doctoral work on DNA replication focused on the study of short Okazaki fragments, which were generated during aberrant DNA repair in E.coli.

== Career and research ==
After Tye's training in the field of prokaryotic DNA replication at Stanford University, she moved to Ithaca, New York and started her own laboratory at Cornell University in 1977. In her independent career, Tye began forging new discoveries surrounding DNA replication in eukaryotes, an understudied area at the time. Tye took a genetic approach to isolate mutants that regulate DNA replication, which led to her identification of the minichromosome maintenance (MCM) genes in yeast in 1984. Her findings together with the identification of the origin recognition complex (ORC) by Bell and Stillman in 1992 generated substantial momentum in the field of eukaryotic DNA replication.

Tye's contributions to the field continued during her tenure at Cornell. Throughout the 1990s, Tye functionally characterized the components of eukaryotic DNA replication machinery. At Cornell, Tye mentored numerous graduate students, was the associate chair of the Department of Biochemistry, Molecular, and Cell Biology, directed the Genetics and Development Graduate Studies Program, and finally received her Emerita status in 2015 for her contributions to the Cornell community.

In 2011, Tye began a visiting professorship at the Hong Kong University of Science and Technology, where she addressed a large gap in the field: the lack of high-resolution structures for DNA replication complexes. To place genetic and biochemical DNA replication data into physical context, Tye and collaborators used cryogenic electron microscopy (cryo-EM) to determine the high resolution structures of numerous DNA replication complexes. These include the yeast and human pre-replication complexes, yeast ORC, Dbf4-Cdc7 kinase (DDK)-MCM complex, and the replisome engaged in parental histone transfer. The finding that a histone hexamer is the transfer intermediate provided insight into the mechanism of how parental histones are symmetrically distributed by the replisome to the newly replicated strands at the replication fork, coupling DNA replication to epigenetic inheritance.

Selected publications

1. Tye BK. Four decades of eukaryotic DNA replication: from yeast genetics to high-resolution cryo-EM structures of the replisome. PNAS 121(42) e2415231121. (2024)

2. Li N, Gao Y, Zhang Y, Yu D, Lin J, Feng J, Li J, Xu Z, Zhang Y, Dang S, Zhou K, Liu Y, Li XD, Tye BK, Li Q, Gao N, Zhai YL. Parental histone transfer caught at the replication fork. Nature 627:8005, 890-897. (2024)

3. Li J, Dong J, Wang W, Yu D, Fan X, Hui YC, Lee CSK, Lam WH, Alary N, Yang Y, Zhang Y, Zhao Q, Chen CL, Tye BK, Dang S, Zhai Y. The human pre-replication complex is an open complex. Cell 186:1, 98-111. (2023)

4. Cheng J, Li N, Huo Y, Dang S, Tye BK, Gao N, Zhai Y. Structural Insight into the MCM Double Hexamer Activation by Dbf4-Cdc7 Kinase. Nat Commun 13:1396. (2022)

5. Lee CSK, Cheung MF, Li J, Zhao Y, Lam WH, Ho V, Rohs R, Zhai Y, Leung D, Tye BK. Humanizing the Yeast Origin Recognition Complex. Nat Commun 12:33. (2021)

6. Li, N, Lam WH, Zhai Y, Cheng J, Zhao Y, Gao, N and Tye, BK. Structure of the Origin Recognition Complex Bound to DNA Replication Origin. Nature 559:217-222. (2018)

7. Li, N., Zhai, Y, Zhang Y., Li, W., Yang, M., Lei, J., Tye, BK, Gao, N. Structure of the Eukaryotic Minichromosome Maintenance Complex at 3.8Å. Nature 524:186-91. (2015)

8. Maine, G., Sinha, P. and Tye, B.K. Mutants of S. cerevisiae defective in the maintenance of minichromosomes. Genetics 106: 365–385. (1984)

9. Chan, C.S.M. and Tye, B.K. Organization of DNA sequences and replication origins at yeast telomeres. Cell 33: 563–573. (1983)

10.Chan, C.S.M. and Tye, B.K. Autonomously replicating sequences in Saccharomyces cerevisiae. Proc. Natl. Acad. Sci. USA 77: 6329–6333. (1980)
