= Till the End of Time =

Till the End of Time may refer to:

- Till the End of Time (song), a song by Buddy Kaye and Ted Mossman, recorded by a number of artists, notably Perry Como
- Til the End of Time, a song by Cody Carnes
- Til the End of Time, an EP by Almost Monday
- Till the End of Time, a song by Bad Boys Blue
- Till the End of Time (film), starring Dorothy McGuire and Guy Madison (1946)
- Star Ocean: Till the End of Time, a PlayStation 2 video game

== See also ==
- Until the End of Time (disambiguation)
