= The Elegant Universe =

1999 book by Brian Greene

The Elegant Universe: Superstrings, Hidden Dimensions, and the Quest for the Ultimate Theory
- Hardcover edition
- Author: Brian Greene
- Cover artist: Sherry Love
- Language: English
- Subject: String theory
- Genre: Nonfiction
- Publisher: W. W. Norton
- Publication date: 1999/2003
- Publication place: United States
- Media type: Print (hardcover and paperback)
- Pages: 448 pp. (2003 edition)
- ISBN: 0-393-05858-1 (2003 edition)
- Followed by: The Fabric of the Cosmos

The Elegant Universe: Superstrings, Hidden Dimensions, and the Quest for the Ultimate Theory(1999) is a popular science book by Brian Greene. He explains the two great pillars of modern physics, general relativity and quantum mechanics, and how they might be united by string theory. It was a finalist for the Pulitzer Prize for General Nonfiction and won the Royal Society Prize for Science Books. In 2003, it was the basis for a NOVA documentary of the same name. That year, a new edition was released with an updated preface.

== Summary ==
=== Part I: The Edge of Knowledge ===
Chapter 1, "Tied Up With String", briefly introduces the conflicts between our current theories, and how they may be resolved. He introduces the building blocks of matter, electrons and quarks, and the forces that govern them.

=== Part II: The Dilemma of Space, Time, and the Quantum ===
Chapter 2, "Space, Time, and the Eye of the Beholder" explains Albert Einstein's special relativity, which united James Clerk Maxwell's electrodynamics with Galileo's principle of relativity. Einstein established that speed of light is a universal constant, and that the laws of physics are the same for all observers in relative motion. As a consequence, Isaac Newton's absolute time and space were replaced by a dynamic spacetime.

Chapter 3, "Of Warps and Ripples", introduces Einstein's general relativity, which resolved the conflict between Newton's theory of gravity and special relativity. General relativity explains gravity as the curvature of spacetime.

Chapter 4, "Microscopic Weirdness", introduces quantum mechanics. Greene begins with Max Planck's 1900 proposal that energy is absorbed and emitted in discrete units, or quanta. In 1905, Einstein used quantum theory to explain the photoelectric effect, the extraction of electrons from a metal by light. Greene uses the double-slit experiment to illustrate wave-particle duality of light. Louis de Broglie extended this to include matter. Werner Heisenberg's uncertainty principle says that we cannot simultaneously know the position and velocity of a particle, and the more we know about one, the less we know about the other.

Chapter 5, "The Need For a New Theory: General Relativity vs. Quantum Mechanics" explains the conflict between the two pillars of modern physics.

=== Part III: The Cosmic Symphony ===
Chapter 6, "Nothing But Music: The Essentials of String Theory" offers a brief history of string theory, starting with Gabriele Veneziano's work on the strong nuclear force. String theory replaces the conception of electrons and quarks as point particles with tiny, vibrating loops of string. One such vibration describes the properties predicted for the graviton, the postulated quantum of gravity.

Chapter 7, "The 'Super' in Superstrings" discusses the importance of symmetry in physics, and the possibility of supersymmetry.

Chapter 8, "More Dimensions than Meets the Eye" discusses Theodor Kaluza's proposed unification of general relativity and electromagnetism, which required an extra dimension of space. The idea was elaborated on by the mathematician Oskar Klein.

Chapter 9, "The Smoking Gun: Experimental Signatures" discusses criticisms of string theory, namely that it has not yet yielded testable predictions. Greene explains how this may change in the near future.

=== Part IV: String Theory and the Fabric of Spacetime ===
Chapter 10, "Quantum Geometry" discusses Calabi-Yau spaces and their applications.

Chapter 11, "Tearing the Fabric of Space" discusses Greene's own work in string theory, and how strings could repair tears in the fabric of space

Chapter 12, "Beyond Strings: In Search of M-Theory" discusses the different versions of string theory, and how they might be pointing towards a single theory, mysteriously called M-Theory.

Chapter 13, "Black Holes: A String/ M-Theory Perspective" looks at mysteries of black holes and how they might be resolved by string theory. Greene discusses Stephen Hawking and Jacob Bekenstein's discovery of black hole thermodynamics and Hawking's discovery of Hawking radiation.

Chapter 14, "Reflections on Cosmology" gives an overview of the standard Big Bang model and the refinements of inflationary cosmology. String theory could answer questions such as whether the universe began with a singularity.

=== Part V: Unification in the Twenty-First Century ===
Chapter 15,"Prospects" looks at questions string theory might answer, such as the nature of space and time. He speculates about the future of the theory.

== Reception ==
George Johson wrote in The New York Times:

Writing about this area of physics, as Greene does, without assuming that the reader has any mathematical background is the hardest challenge of popular science writing. Michio Kaku, a physicist at City College in New York, provided a very nice introduction to superstrings in Beyond Einstein: The Cosmic Quest for the Theory of the Universe. But Greene goes beyond Kaku's book, exploring the ideas and recent developments with a depth and clarity I wouldn't have thought possible. Like Simon Singh in Fermat's Enigma, he has a rare ability to explain even the most evanescent ideas in a way that gives at least the illusion of understanding, enough of a mental toehold to get on with the climb.

John H. Schwarz wrote:

Since he is an expert in the subject, Greene's description of the current state of understanding of string theory is reliable. I am not aware of any errors in his depiction of the subject. He writes with a flair that is rare in the scientific world, and which should make the book very appealing to the lay reader. Indeed, following the publication of this book, he has become something of a media celebrity.

Ian McEwan included the book in his canon of science writing. Steven Weinberg included it on his list of the thirteen best science books for the general reader.

== Adaptations ==
The Elegant Universe was adapted into an Emmy Award-winning three-hour program in three parts for television broadcast by David Hickman in late 2003 on the PBS series NOVA.

- Einstein's Dream
- String's The Thing
- Welcome To The 11th Dimension

The Elegant Universe was also interpreted by choreographer Karole Armitage, of Armitage Gone! Dance, in New York City. A performance of the work-in-progress formed part of the inaugural World Science Festival.

== See also ==
- The Fabric of the Cosmos (2004)
- The Road to Reality (2004)
