= A Brief History of Time (film) =

1991 film by Errol Morris

- VHS cover
- Directed by: Errol Morris
- Based on: A Brief History of Time by Stephen Hawking
- Produced by: David Hickman
- Starring: Stephen Hawking
- Cinematography: John Bailey; Stefan Czapsky
- Edited by: Brad Fuller
- Music by: Philip Glass
- Production companies: Anglia Television; Channel Four Films; Elstree Studios; Tokyo Broadcasting System
- Distributed by: Triton Pictures
- Release dates: October 1991 (Los Angeles); January 1992 (Sundance); August 21, 1992
- Running time: 80 minutes
- Countries: United States; United Kingdom; Japan
- Language: English
- Box office: $2.3 million

A Brief History of Time is a 1991 biographical documentary film about the physicist Stephen Hawking, directed by Errol Morris. The title derives from Hawking's bestselling 1988 book A Brief History of Time, but, whereas the book is solely an explanation of cosmology, the film is also a biography of Hawking, featuring interviews with some of his family members and colleagues. The film is scored by frequent Morris collaborator Philip Glass.

== Production ==
This project originated with executive producer Gordon Freedman, who brought it to Anglia Television. After acquiring the property, Freedman met with director Steven Spielberg for advice on how to make the project into a documentary film. Spielberg suggested Errol Morris as director. Morris had studied the history and philosophy of science at Princeton and later Berkeley, so was familiar with many of the topics in Hawking's book. Freedman's production company partnered with Anglia Television and Tokyo Broadcasting. David Hickman, of Anglia, became the film's producer.

Morris only had a few days of access to film and interview Hawking. Because of Hawking's ALS, a disease that progressively affects nerve cells within the spine and brain, Morris filmed various static shots of Hawking, his wheelchair, and the tools he used to communicate, such as his battery-powered computer-based communication system with an electronic voicebox (which was sponsored and provided by Intel Corporation), to later edit together for the video component of Hawking's interview segments in the film.

Although Hawking had an aversion to featuring his personal life in the film, Morris saw A Brief History of Time as being as much a biography as a science text, and much of his directing and editing work was dedicated to finding ways to depict ideas from theoretical physics and cosmology and then connect those ideas with details from the life of Hawking. He employed stylized interview sequences, graphic illustrations, and music written by Glass. Morris also included clips from Disney's The Black Hole (1979).

Instead of Morris traveling around and filming the various interview subjects in their native surroundings, all of the interviews for this film were shot on specially built sets on a sound stage in England. Morris said he was "very moved by Hawking as a man", calling him "immensely likable, perverse, funny...and yes, he's a genius." He remembers that Hawking had posters of Marilyn Monroe in his office, and one of them fell down while they were filming. "A fallen woman", Hawking's speech synthesizer intoned. Hawking's mother, Isobel, is the first person we hear from in the movie, and near the end she describes her son as "a seeker" for truth. After the movie premiered, Hawking told Morris, "Thank you for making my mother a star."

== List of interviewees ==
(in order of appearance)

- Isobel Hawking, Hawking's mother
- Janet Humphrey, Hawking's aunt
- Mary Hawking, Hawking's sister
- Basil King, neighbor of the Hawkings
- Derek Powney, classmate of Hawking at Oxford
- Norman Dix, classmate of Hawking at Oxford
- Robert Berman, tutor of Hawking at Oxford
- Gordon Berry, classmate of Hawking at Oxford
- Roger Penrose, mathematical physicist who worked with Hawking on Penrose-Hawking singularity theorems
- Dennis Sciama, cosmologist and PhD supervisor for Hawking
- John Wheeler, theoretical physicist who coined the phrase "black hole"
- Brandon Carter, physicist
- John Taylor, physicist
- Kip Thorne, astrophysicist and friend of Hawking
- Don Page, theoretical physicist, doctoral student of Hawking
- Christopher Isham, physicist
- Brian Whitt, physicist and editor of Hawking's A Brief History of Time
- Raymond Laflamme, theoretical physicist, doctoral student of Hawking

== Music ==
The soundtrack for A Brief History of Time was composed by Philip Glass. Morris says he had Glass compose the score before showing him the movie; instead, he would give him relevant cues like "falling into a black hole" or "event horizon."

=== Soundtrack ===
A Brief History of Time

Soundtrack album by Philip Glass
- Released: 2015
- Label: Orange Mountain Music
- Producer: Kurt Munkacsi

No.	Title	Length
1.	"Brief History of Time Title"	1:29
2.	"Mysterious No. 4"	3:36
3.	"Bombs with Fidelity"	2:22
4.	"Slow, Simple, Sad No. 3"	3:50
5.	"Mysterious No. 1"
6.	"Slow, Simple, Sad No. 4"	3:57
7.	"Mysterious No. 2"	2:42
8.	"Hawking Radiation"	1:42
9.	"Bombs"	2:47
10.	"Dice"	2:11
11.	"Hawking-Radiation with Brass"	1:43
12.	"Climbing the Stairs"	1:23
13.	"End with Strings and Trumpets"	2:17
14.	"Melody in Major"	3:10
15.	"Signature"	2:54
16.	"Utility No. 1"	3:32
17.	"House"	2:06
18.	"Closing No. 1"	3:28
19.	"End Credits Arpeggio and Brass"	2:11
20.	"End Credits Major and Minor"	4:48

== Reception ==
A Brief History of Time received largely positive reviews. On review aggregator website Rotten Tomatoes, the film holds a 93% rating based on 15 reviews. On Metacritic, the film has a 78 out of 100 rating based on 12 critics, indicating "generally favorable" reviews.

== Availability ==
The film was released on VHS in the early 1990s, but remained unreleased on DVD or Blu-ray until The Criterion Collection issued a release on April 15, 2014.

== See also ==
- List of films about mathematicians

Awards
Preceded by American Dream	Sundance Grand Jury Prize: Documentary; 1992	Succeeded by Children of Fate
