= The Hidden Reality =

Book by Brian Greene

The Hidden Reality: Parallel Universes and the Deep Laws of the Cosmos
- Hardcover edition
- Author: Brian Greene
- Language: English
- Subject: Multiverse
- Genre: Non-fiction
- Publisher: Alfred A. Knopf
- Publication date: January 25, 2011
- Publication place: United States
- Media type: Print, e-book, audiobook
- Pages: 384 pp.
- ISBN: 978-0307265630
- Preceded by: Icarus at the Edge of Time
- Followed by: Until the End of Time

Brian Greene talks about The Hidden Reality on Bookbits radio.

The Hidden Reality: Parallel Universes and the Deep Laws of the Cosmos is a book by Brian Greene published in 2011 which explores the concept of the multiverse and the possibility of parallel universes. It has been nominated for the Royal Society Winton Prize for Science Books for 2012.

== Content ==
In his book, Greene discussed nine types of parallel universes:

- The quilted multiverse says that conditions in an infinite universe necessarily repeat across space, yielding parallel worlds.
- The inflationary multiverse says that eternal cosmological inflation yields an enormous network of bubble universes, of which our universe would be one.
- The brane multiverse states that in M-theory, in the brane world scenario, our universe exists on one three-dimensional brane, which floats in a higher dimensional expanse potentially populated by other branes – other parallel universes.
- The cyclic multiverse is saying that collisions between braneworlds can manifest as big bang-like beginnings, yielding universes that are parallel in time.
- The landscape multiverse states that by combining inflationary cosmology and string theory, the many different shapes for string theory's extra dimensions give rise to many different bubble universes.
- The quantum multiverse creates a new universe when a diversion in events occurs, as in the many-worlds interpretation of quantum mechanics.
- The holographic multiverse is derived from the theory that the surface area of a space can simulate the volume of the region.
- The simulated multiverse implies that technological leaps suggest that the universe is just a simulation.
- The ultimate multiverse is the ultimate theory, saying the principle of fecundity asserts that every possible universe is a real universe, thereby obviating the question of why one possibility – ours – is special. These universes instantiate all possible mathematical equations.

== Reception ==
- Timothy Ferris reports in the review in The New York Times Book Review that “If extraterrestrials landed tomorrow and demanded to know what the human mind is capable of accomplishing, we could do worse than to hand them a copy of this book.”
- Anthony Doerr, in his On Science column of the Boston Globe, wrote that "Greene might be the best intermediary I’ve found between the sparkling, absolute zero world of mathematics and the warm, clumsy world of human language." Doerr praised Greene's use of analogies to explain the complex phenomena of parallel universes.
- John Gribbin, in the Wall Street Journal, declared that The Hidden Reality was "Mr. Greene's weakest book", but conceded that Greene's earlier books "left him with such high standards to live up to that this is not really surprising." Gribbin also criticized the lack of depth on certain subjects, such as M-theory and the interactions of three-dimensional universes.
- Publishers Weekly hails The Hidden Reality “An in-depth yet marvelously accessible look inside the perplexing world of modern theoretical physics and cosmology . . . Greene presents a lucid, intriguing, and triumphantly understandable state-of-the-art look at the universe.”(Starred review)
- Janet Maslin, The New York Times claims “Mr. Greene has a gift for elucidating big ideas . . . Exciting and rewarding . . . [The Hidden Reality] captures and engages the imagination.”
- John Horgan. Scientific American "Is speculation in multiverses as immoral as speculation in subprime mortgages?." "Horgan’s exasperation with seeing the multiverse heavily promoted by famous physicists appears to have more to do with the idea that this is a retreat by physicists from engagement with the real world, something morally obtuse in an era of growing problems that scientists could help address."
- Peter Woit "My own moral concerns about the multiverse have more to do with worry that pseudo-science is being heavily promoted to the public, leading to the danger that it will ultimately take over from science, first in the field of fundamental physics, then perhaps spreading to others.

== In popular culture ==
The book and its author were featured on the television series The Big Bang Theory in episode 20 of season 4, "The Herb Garden Germination".

== See also ==
- Multiverse
- Shape of the universe

=== Related books ===
- Brian Greene, The Fabric of the Cosmos (2004)
- Lisa Randall, Warped Passages (2005)
- Michio Kaku, Parallel Worlds (book) (2004)
- Leonard Susskind, The Cosmic Landscape (2005)
- Alexander Vilenkin, Many Worlds in One: The Search for Other Universes (July 2006)
- Sean Carroll, From Eternity to Here
- John Gribbin, In Search of the Multiverse
- Stephen Hawking and Leonard Mlodinow, The Grand Design (book)
- Steven Manly, Visions of the Multiverse
- Richard Panek, The 4 Percent Universe (2011)
