= Flop-transition =

Flop transition

In theoretical physics, particularly string theory and M-theory, the notion of a flop-transition is basically the shrinking of a sphere in a Calabi–Yau space to the point of tearing. Based on typical spacetime topology, this is not possible due to mathematical technicalities. On the other hand, mirror symmetry allows for the mathematical similarity between two distinct Calabi–Yau manifolds. If one undergoes a flop-transition, the mirror of it should result in identical mathematical properties, which it does.

== Definition ==
If there is a given Calabi–Yau manifold (basically a space with 6 or more dimensions curled up in a special way) then a sphere in the center can shrink down to an infinitesimal point that resembles a singularity. After reaching the singularity-like point, the sphere tears and then a new sphere "blows up" to replace the torn one. The sphere in the mirror image (from mirror symmetry) merely undergoes topologically smooth transition. The mathematical results from the separate manifolds result in the same physics, so no laws of physics or mathematics are violated.

== Why is it possible? ==
Theoretical physicist Edward Witten proposed that the reason no flop-transition has ever caused universally catastrophic results is because the world-sheet of the strings will surround the flop-transitioning sphere and virtually cancel out the effects. The path integral formulation of quantum field theory says that the string (and therefore its world sheet) traverse virtually every possible path, and therefore for any flop-transition, a string world-sheet will be present to cancel out its effects.

== See also ==
- String theory
- M-theory
- Mirror symmetry
- Calabi–Yau space
