= Henry Tye =

Chinese-American cosmologist and theoretical physicist

S.-H. Henry Tye
- Born: 1947 (age 78–79); Shanghai, China
- Education: MIT, Caltech
- Known for: Brane Inflation, Cosmic Inflation, Cosmic Superstrings
- Scientific career
- Fields: String Theory / Cosmology
- Workplaces: Cornell, HKUST
- Doctoral advisor: Francis E. Low
- Doctoral students: Keith Dienes, Sarah Shandera, Gary Shiu, Sash Sarangi, Louis Leblond, Benjamin Shlaer, Nicholas Jones, Horace Stoica, David Senechal

Sze-Hoi Henry Tye (Chinese: 戴自海; born 1947 in Shanghai, China) is a Chinese-American cosmologist and theoretical physicist most notable for proposing that relative brane motion could cause cosmic inflation as well as his work on superstring theory, brane cosmology and elementary particle physics. He had his primary and secondary school education in Hong Kong. Graduated from La Salle College. He received his B.S. from the California Institute of Technology and his Ph.D. in physics from the Massachusetts Institute of Technology under Francis Low. He is the Horace White Professor of Physics, Emeritus, at Cornell University and a fellow of the American Physical Society. He joined the Hong Kong University of Science and Technology in 2011 and was the Director of HKUST Jockey Club Institute for Advanced Study during 2011-2016.

Together with Gia Dvali, he suggested the idea of brane inflation in 1998 in which inflation arises because of the weak forces supersymmetry allows between identical branes. A variant of this proposal based on branes and antibranes was later put on concrete string theoretic grounds by Shamit Kachru and collaborators. He went on to work out many details of brane inflation with his research group at Cornell. He was responsible for the revival of the interest in cosmic strings. Cosmic superstrings are produced at the end of brane inflation due to brane-antibrane annihilation. Apart from the details of brane inflation, he has been working on issues related to the string landscape and quantum cosmology with his collaborators.

Alan Guth, in his book The Inflationary Universe, tells the story of how he was led to think about issues that resulted in the original idea of cosmic inflation due to the influence of Henry Tye. At that time they were both postdocs at Cornell University. Tye went to China for six weeks in 1979 during the time that Guth came up with his historic inflation breakthrough. "Had he not gone to China, Henry surely would have been a coauthor on the first inflation paper," Guth said.

Earlier on in his career Tye was involved with many important ideas such as the construction of fermionic string models with Kawai and Lewellen (Kawai-Lewellen-Tye), fractional superstrings, grand unified string models, brane world.

== Personal life ==
Henry Tye is married to Bik Kwoon Yeung. His daughter is Kay Tye.
