= Mirjam Cvetič =

Slovenian-American physicist

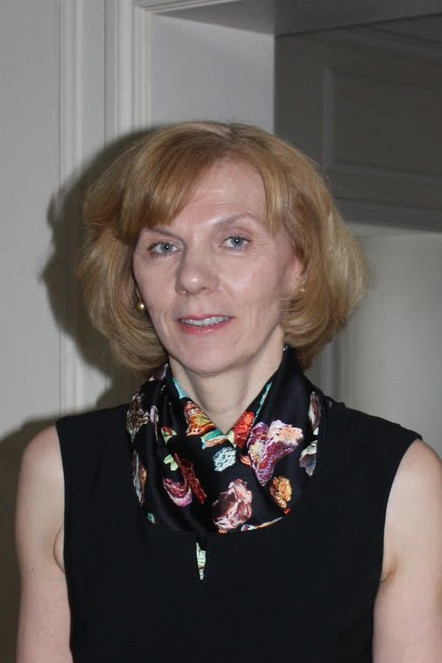
Cvetič in 2012

Mirjam Cvetič is a Slovenian-American theoretical physicist at the University of Pennsylvania, where she is Fay R. and Eugene L. Langberg Professor of Physics and of Mathematics. Cvetič has a background in basic theory, phenomenology and conducts research that bridges the gap between basic theory and experimental consequences on certain theories. Her research includes the applications of string theory, M-theory to black hole behavior, and particle phenomenology. Also, she has published highly cited works on supersymmetry, more than two hundred journal articles and is the editor of Physics Letter B.

== Education and career ==
Cvetič earned bachelor's and master's degrees at the University of Ljubljana in 1979 and 1981, respectively. She completed her doctorate at the University of Maryland, College Park in 1984. Her dissertation, Origin of Mass Hierarchies in Gauge Theories, was supervised by Jogesh Pati. After working as a researcher at the Stanford Linear Accelerator Center and the University of Pennsylvania, she joined the University of Pennsylvania faculty in 1989. She became Class of 1965 Endowed Term Professor in 1999, and Fay R. and Eugene L. Langberg Endowed Chair in 2003.

As of 2020, she is the lead editor of Physical Review D. She is also a member and co-PI of the Simons Collaboration on Special Holonomy in Geometry, Analysis, and Physics.

== Recognition ==
Cvetič was named a Fellow of the American Physical Society in 2001, "for her work in a wide range of topics in supergravity and string theory, from non-perturbative gravitational effects such as black holes and domain walls to their phenomenological consequences".She won the University of Maryland Physics Distinguished Alumni Award in 2007. Cvetič was also awarded the Lindback Award and Ira H. Abrams Memorial Award for Distinguished Teaching in 2012. The Lindback Award is regarded as the University of Penn States highest teaching award. In addition, the Ira H. Abrams Memorial Award for Distinguished Teaching recognizes teaching that is intellectually challenging and exceptionally coherent and honors faculty who embody high standards of integrity and fairness, have a strong commitment to learning, and are open to new ideas. In 2019, the Alexander von Humboldt Foundation gave her their Carl Friedrich von Siemens Research Award, funding her for a visit to the Max Planck Institute for Physics.She was elected to the American Academy of Arts and Sciences in 2023.
