= Icarus at the Edge of Time =

Book by Brian Greene

- Hardcover edition
- Author: Brian Greene
- Language: English
- Subject: Retelling of Icarus' tale
- Genre: Science fiction
- Publisher: Alfred A. Knopf
- Publication date: 2008
- Publication place: United States
- Media type: Print
- Pages: 34
- ISBN: 978-0307268884
- Preceded by: The Fabric of the Cosmos
- Followed by: The Hidden Reality

Icarus at the Edge of Time is a 2008 children's book written by the physicist Brian Greene and illustrated by Chip Kidd with images from the Hubble Space Telescope.

== Plot introduction ==
The book is a science fiction retelling of Icarus' tale. It is about a young man who runs away from his traveling, deep-space home to explore a black hole.

== Reception ==
Publishers Weekly review said, "Attractive on the shelf as both contemporary and science-focused, it is exactly what the author is trying to accomplish with his re-told fable, as well as a fine treatment of already beautiful imagery; not a lot of pushing and pulling is needed." A Trashotron review said, "fiction space opera as well as a new kind of children's book. It really does hold up with an appeal for anyone who is interested in science, storytelling or fathers and sons. That might add up to a sizable audience. They'll be well-rewarded, and it's good that the book can withstand multiple readings. It will get read and re-read; it is, after all, a myth." Booklist in their review called the novel "clever, charming, and mind-expanding, the perfect vehicle for conveying the astonishingly supple nature of space, time, and the human mind."

== Film adaptation ==
In 2010, Icarus at the Edge of Time was made into a film by the British filmmakers AL and AL. It was written by Greene and the playwright David Henry Hwang, with an original score by Philip Glass, and narrated by LeVar Burton.
