= Brian Greene =

American theoretical physicist (born 1963)

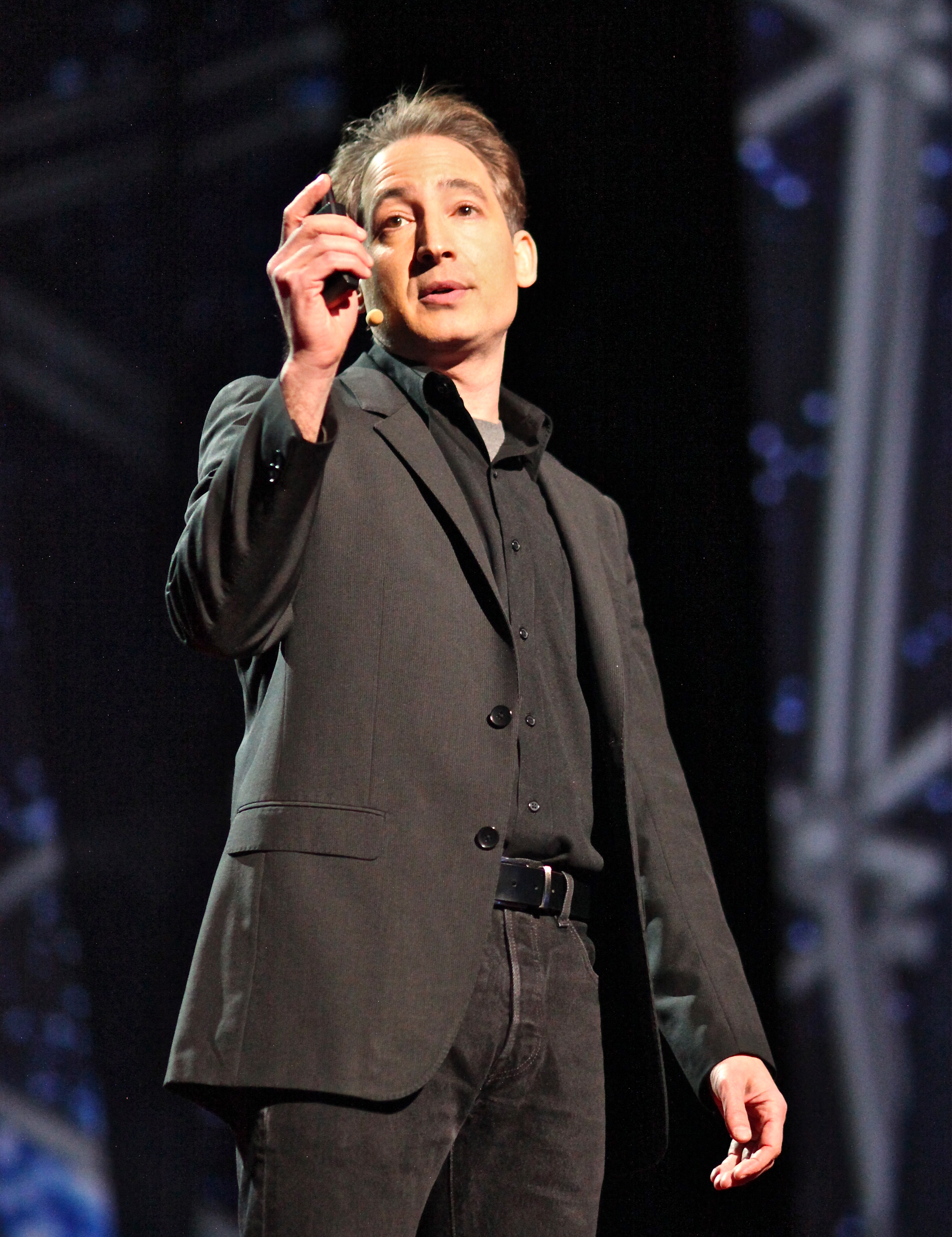
- Greene in 2012
- Born: Brian Randolph Greene; February 9, 1963 (age 63); New York City, U.S.
- Education: Harvard University (BS); Magdalen College, Oxford (DPhil)
- Known for: String theory Mirror symmetry Topology change The Elegant Universe; The Fabric of the Cosmos; The Hidden Reality; Until the End of Time
- Spouse: Tracy Day
- Children: 2
- Awards: AAAS Award (2025); Pupin Medal (2022); Andrew Gemant Award (2003); Peabody Award (2003); Pulitzer Prize Finalist (2000); Sloan Fellow (1993); NSF Young Investigator (1992)
- Scientific career
- Fields: Physics
- Workplaces: Harvard University; Cornell University; Columbia University; World Science Festival
- Thesis: Superstrings: topology, geometry and phenomenology and astrophysical implications of supersymmetric models (1986)
- Doctoral advisor: Graham G. Ross; James Binney

Brian Randolph Greene (born February 9, 1963) is an American physicist known for his research on string theory. He is a professor of physics and mathematics at Columbia University, director of its center for theoretical physics, and the chairman of the World Science Festival, which he co-founded in 2008. Greene co-discovered mirror symmetry, relating two different Calabi–Yau manifolds. He also described the flop transition, a mild form of topology change, and the conifold transition, a more severe transformation of space, showing that topology can smoothly change in string theory.

His books The Elegant Universe (1999), The Fabric of the Cosmos (2004), The Hidden Reality (2011), and Until the End of Time (2020) were all top 10 New York Times bestsellers. Greene hosted two Emmy and Peabody Award Winning NOVA miniseries based on his books. He also appeared on The Big Bang Theory episode "The Herb Garden Germination", as well as in the films Frequency and The Last Mimzy. From 2015 to 2020, he served on the board of overseers of Harvard University, and is currently a member of the board of sponsors of the Bulletin of the Atomic Scientists.

== Early life and education ==
Greene was born in New York City of Jewish background. His father, Alan Greene, was a one-time vaudeville performer and high school dropout who later worked as a voice coach and composer.

After graduating from Stuyvesant High School in 1980, where he was classmates with fellow physicist and science popularizer Lisa Randall, Greene studied physics at Harvard University, graduating in 1984 with a Bachelor of Science, summa cum laude. He then did doctoral study in theoretical physics at Magdalen College, Oxford, under Graham Ross and James Binney. He received a Doctor of Philosophy in 1987 with a thesis entitled "Superstrings: topology, geometry and phenomenology and astrophysical implications of supersymmetric models". While at Oxford, Greene also studied piano with the concert pianist Jack Gibbons.

== Academic career ==
Greene joined the physics faculty of Cornell University in 1990, received tenure in 1993, and was appointed to a full professorship in 1995. The following year, he joined the faculty of Columbia University as a full professor. At Columbia, Greene is director of the university's center for theoretical physics and is leading a research program at the intersection of string theory, mathematical physics, and cosmology.

=== Research ===
Greene's area of research is string theory, a candidate for a theory of quantum gravity. He is known for his contribution to the understanding of the different shapes the curled-up dimensions of string theory can take. The most important of these shapes are so-called Calabi–Yau manifolds; when the extra dimensions take on those particular forms, physics in three dimensions exhibits an abstract symmetry known as supersymmetry.

Greene co-discovered a particular class of symmetry relating two different Calabi–Yau manifolds, known as mirror symmetry and is known for his research on the flop-transition, a mild form of topology change, and also the conifold transition, a more severe transformation of space, showing that topology in string theory can change smoothly.

Greene has also studied string cosmology, especially the imprints of trans-Planckian physics on the cosmic microwave background, and brane-gas cosmologies that could explain why the space around us has three large dimensions. His work has expanded on the suggestion of a black hole electron, namely that a black hole can continuously transform into a particle such as an electron.

Currently, Greene is studying non-simply connected and non-orientable compactifications and has showed that in some of these contexts, signals can have an effective speed greater than that of light, and even travel back in time.

== Communicating science ==
=== Books ===
Greene is well known to a wider audience for his work on popularizing theoretical physics, in particular string theory and the search for a unified theory of physics. His first book, The Elegant Universe: Superstrings, Hidden Dimensions, and the Quest for the Ultimate Theory, published in 1999 and a New York Times Best Seller, is a popularization of superstring theory and M-theory. It was a finalist for the Pulitzer Prize in nonfiction, and winner of The Aventis Prizes for Science Books in 2000.

Greene's second book, The Fabric of the Cosmos: Space, Time, and the Texture of Reality (2004), a New York Times Best Seller, is about space, time, and the nature of the universe. Aspects covered in this book include non-local particle entanglement as it relates to special relativity and basic explanations of string theory. It is an examination of the very nature of matter and reality, covering such topics as spacetime and cosmology, origins and unification, and including an exploration into reality and the imagination.

Greene's third book, The Hidden Reality: Parallel Universes and the Deep Laws of the Cosmos, published in January 2011, was a New York Times Best Seller and deals in greater depth with multiple universes, or, as they are sometimes referred to collectively, the multiverse.

Greene's most recent book, Until the End of Time: Mind Matter and Our Search for Meaning in an Evolving Universe (2020), was a New York Times Best Seller and explores the universe's evolution and likely end, as well as the emergence of life and consciousness, bridging cosmological and existentialist thought.

=== Documentary television ===
Greene's first book, The Elegant Universe, was adapted into a three-part PBS television special of the same name, hosted and narrated by Greene, which won a 2003 Peabody Award.

Greene's second book, The Fabric of the Cosmos, was adapted into a four-part PBS television special of the same name, hosted and narrated by Greene, which premiered in 2011 and was nominated for multiple Emmy Awards.

Greene was also featured in ABC's Nightline in Primetime: Brave New World series.

=== Stage works ===
Greene worked with by composer Philip Glass, playwright David Henry Hwang, filmmakers AL and AL, and executive producer Tracy Day to adapt Greene's novella Icarus at the Edge of Time, which is a futuristic re-telling of the Icarus myth, into a stage work for full orchestra, film, and narrator. The work premiered on June 6, 2010 at Alice Tully Hall at Lincoln Center for the Performing Arts, with narrator John Lithgow, as part of World Science Festival. Icarus at the Edge of Time has since been performed 55 times in 31 cities and 13 countries, with narrators including Liev Schreiber, Kate Mulgrew, Levar Burton, and David Morrissey.

Greene wrote the stage work Light Falls: Space, Time, and an Obsession of Einstein, which traces Albert Einstein's discovery of the General Theory of Relativity, and his subsequent failed attempts to find what he called "the unified theory." The original score was written by Jeff Beal and visuals and stage production were created by 59 Productions, with executive producer Tracy Day. The work premiered on February 19, 2019 at the Gerald Lynch Theater in New York City, with Greene in the role of narrator, and was filmed by Great Performances for national broadcast on PBS on the centenary of the confirmation of General Relativity, May 29, 2019.

Greene wrote the stage work Time, Creativity and the Cosmos, exploring the origin of the universe, life, and creative expression, which premiered on May 30, 2017 at Lincoln Center's Rose Theater, with Greene in the role of narrator and performers Pilobolus, Joshua Bell, Renee Fleming, Brian Stokes Mitchell, and David Draiman.

=== World Science Festival ===
In 2008, together with former ABC News producer Tracy Day, Greene co-founded the World Science Festival as a forum for cultivating "a general public informed by science, inspired by its wonder, convinced of its value, and prepared to engage with its implications for the future." Since its founding, the World Science Festival has produced more than a thousand live and digital programs on subjects including cosmology, astronomy, quantum mechanics, particle physics, black holes, neuroscience, artificial intelligence, consciousness, quantum biology, genius, creativity, astrobiology, extrasolar planets and psychedelics. These programs have involved hundreds of scientists, technologists, and artists.

=== Media ===
Brian Greene on Bookbits radio

The popularity of his books and his natural on-camera demeanor have resulted in many media appearances, including The Late Show with Stephen Colbert, Good Morning America, CNN, ABC News, CBS News, The History Channel, Conan, The Science Channel, The Discovery Channel, The Colbert Report, Charlie Rose, The Art Bell Show, Coast to Coast AM, BBC World News America, Late Show with David Letterman, Radiolab, and The Joe Rogan Experience. He was interviewed at length by Jim Al-Khalili on the BBC radio program The Life Scientific on 28 April 2020. In April 2011, Greene appeared as himself on The Big Bang Theory in the episode "The Herb Garden Germination", speaking to a small crowd about the contents of his most recent book.

Greene was a technical consultant for the film Frequency, in which he also had a cameo role. He was a consultant on the 2006 time-travel movie Déjà Vu. He also had a cameo appearance as an Intel scientist in 2007's The Last Mimzy. Greene was also mentioned in the 2002 Angel episode "Supersymmetry" and in the 2008 Stargate Atlantis episode "Trio".

Greene has lectured outside of the collegiate setting, at both a general and a technical level, in more than twenty-five countries and all seven continents. In 2012, he received the Richtmyer Memorial Award, which is given annually by the American Association of Physics Teachers.

In May 2013, the Science Laureates of the United States Act of 2013 (H.R. 1891; 113th Congress) was introduced into Congress. Brian Greene was listed by one commentator as a possible nominee for the position of Science Laureate, if the act were to pass.

In March 2015, an Australian spider that uses waves to hunt prey, Dolomedes briangreenei, was to be named in honor of Brian Greene.

=== Recognition ===
- 1984 Rhodes Scholarship
- 1987 National Science Foundation Postdoctoral Fellowship in Mathematical Sciences
- 1992 National Science Foundation National Young Investigator Award
- 1993 Alfred P. Sloan Foundation Fellowship
- 2000 Aventis Prize, The Elegant Universe
- 2000 Pulitzer Prize Finalist for General Nonfiction, The Elegant Universe
- 2003 Gemant Award, American Institute of Physics
- 2003 George Foster Peabody Award, The Elegant Universe with Brian Greene
- 2004 Phi Beta Kappa Book Award
- 2010 Cooper Union Urban Visionary Award
- 2012 AAPT Richtmeyer Memorial Award for Research and Teaching
- 2013 Best Documentary, Jackson Hole Film Festival, Fabric of the Cosmos,
- 2013 Merck-Serono Book Prize for Literature and Science, for The Hidden Reality
- 2022 Michael Pupin Medal for Service to the Nation in Science
- 2025 AAAS Mani L. Bhaumik Award for Public Engagement with Science

== Personal life ==
Greene is married to former ABC producer Tracy Day. They have one son, Alec, and one daughter, Sophia. Greene has been vegetarian since he was nine years old and a vegan since 1997.

Greene has stated that he regards science as being incompatible with literalist interpretations of religion and that there is much in the New Atheism movement which resonates with him because he personally does not feel the need for religious explanation. However, he is uncertain of its efficacy as a strategy for spreading a scientific worldview. In an interview with The Guardian he stated: "When I'm looking to understand myself as a human, and how I fit in to the long chain of human culture that reaches back thousands of years, religion is a deeply valuable part of that story."

== Bibliography ==
=== Popular science ===
- Until the End of Time: Mind, Matter, and Our Search for Meaning in an Evolving Universe (2020)
- Light Falls: Space, Time, and an Obsession of Einstein (2016)
- The Hidden Reality: Parallel Universes and the Deep Laws of the Cosmos (2011)
- Icarus at the Edge of Time (2008)
- The Fabric of the Cosmos: Space, Time, and the Texture of Reality (2004)
- The Elegant Universe: Superstrings, Hidden Dimensions, and the Quest for the Ultimate Theory (1999)

=== Technical articles ===
For a full list of technical articles, consult the publication list in the INSPIRE-HEP database.

- Easther, Richard; Greene, Brian R.; Jackson, Mark G.; Kabat, Daniel (2005). "String windings in the early universe". Journal of Cosmology and Astroparticle Physics. 2005 (2): 009. arXiv:hep-th/0409121. Bibcode:2005JCAP...02..009E. doi:10.1088/1475-7516/2005/02/009. S2CID 18798551.
- Easther, Richard; Greene, Brian R.; Kinney, William H.; Shiu, Gary (2002). "A generic estimate of trans-Planckian modifications to the primordial power spectrum in inflation". Physical Review D. 66 (2) 023518. arXiv:hep-th/0204129. Bibcode:2002PhRvD..66b3518E. doi:10.1103/PhysRevD.66.023518. S2CID 119461276.
- R. Easther, B. Greene, W. Kinney, G. Shiu, "Inflation as a Probe of Short Distance Physics". Physical Review. D64 (2001) 103502.
- Brian R. Greene, "D-Brane Topology Changing Transitions". Nuclear Physics. B525 (1998) 284–296.
- Michael R. Douglas, Brian R. Greene, David R. Morrison, "Orbifold Resolution by D-Branes". Nuclear Physics. B506 (1997) 84–106.
- Brian R. Greene, David R. Morrison, Andrew Strominger, "Black Hole Condensation and the Unification of String Vacua". Nuclear Physics. B451 (1995) 109–120.
- P.S. Aspinwall, B.R. Greene, D.R. Morrison, "Calabi–Yau Moduli Space, Mirror Manifolds and Spacetime Topology Change in String Theory". Nuclear Physics. B416 (1994) 414–480.
- B.R. Greene and M.R. Plesser, "Duality in Calabi-Yau Moduli Space". Nuclear Physics. B338 (1990) 15.
