= Until the End of Time (book) =

2020 book by Brian Greene

Until the End of Time: Mind, Matter, and Our Search for Meaning in an Evolving Universe
- Hardcover edition
- Author: Brian Greene
- Language: English
- Subject: Cosmology
- Genre: Popular science
- Publisher: Alfred A. Knopf
- Publication date: February 18, 2020
- Publication place: United States
- Media type: Print, e-book, audiobook
- Pages: 448
- ISBN: 978-0241295984
- Preceded by: The Hidden Reality

Until the End of Time: Mind, Matter, and Our Search for Meaning in an Evolving Universe is a popular science book by American physicist Brian Greene. The book was published in February 2020 by Alfred A. Knopf. It was also translated into Indonesian version entitled "Hingga Akhir Waktu: Akal Budi, Zat, dan Pencarian Makna dalam Alam Semesta yang Berevolusi" published in February 2022 by Gramedia, and into Polish version titled "Do końca czasu. Umysł, materia i nasze poszukiwanie sensu w zmieniającym się Wszechświecie". This is his fourth full-length book.

== Reception ==
A reviewer of Kirkus Reviews stated, "The author of several bestselling explorations of cutting-edge physics turns his attention to the cosmos, and readers will encounter his usual astute observations and analysis... An insightful history of everything that simplifies its complex subject as much as possible but no further." A reviewer of Publishers Weekly commented, "Curious readers interested in some of the most fundamental questions of existence, and willing to invest some time and thought, will be richly rewarded by his fascinating exploration."
