= Patricia Janak =

American neuroscientist (born 1965)

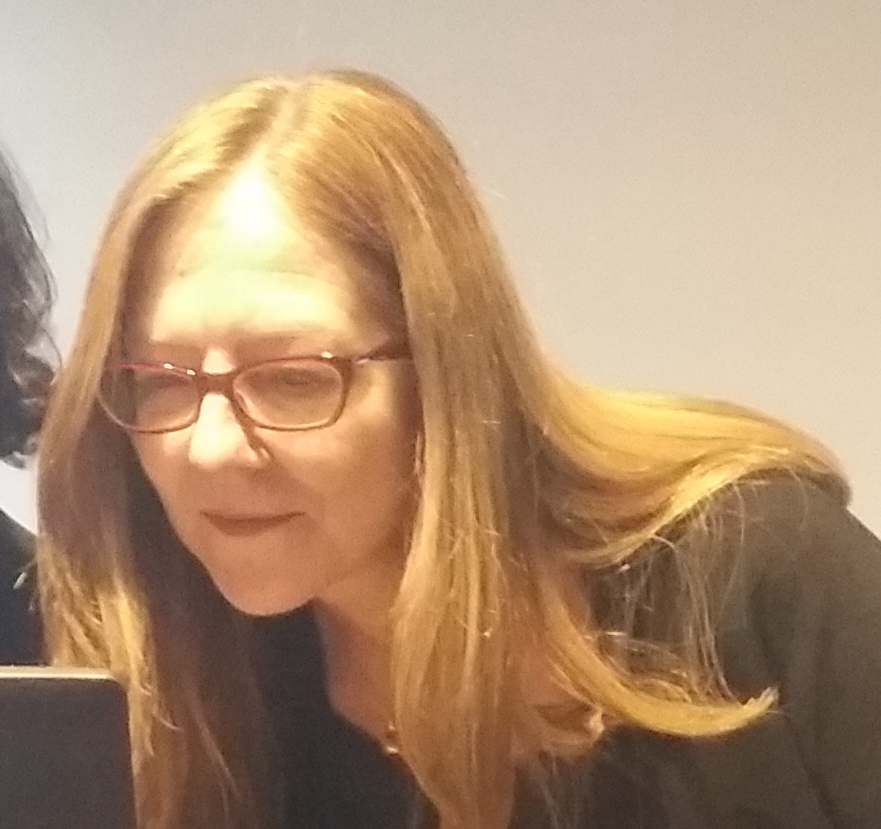
- Born: 1965 (age 60–61); United States
- Education: Rutgers University (B.A., 1986); University of California, Berkeley (M.A., 1990); University of California, Berkeley (Ph.D., 1993); Wake Forest School of Medicine
- Known for: Addiction research
- Awards: Bloomberg Distinguished Professorships (2014); Member, Society for Neuroscience; Member, Research Society on Alcoholism
- Scientific career
- Fields: Neuroscience; Behavioral Neuroscience; Neurobiology; Psychology; Neurology
- Workplaces: Johns Hopkins University
- Doctoral students: Kay Tye

Patricia Janak is a Bloomberg Distinguished Professor at Johns Hopkins University who studies the biological basis of behavior through associative learning. Janak applies this research to pathological behaviors, such as addiction and posttraumatic stress disorder, to improve understanding of how stimuli affect relapse and responses.

== Biography ==
Janak was born in 1965 to Peter Janak and Bonnie Stringfellow. Janak began training in biological science and behavioral science as an undergraduate double major in Biology and Psychology at Rutgers University. She earned master's and doctoral degrees in Psychology from the University of California, Berkeley, the latter under Joe L. Martinez Jr. While completing her doctoral work, she also held adjunct faculty positions at the Wright Institute, Santa Clara University, and California State University, East Bay. She completed post-doctoral work at the National Institute on Drug Abuse, a branch of the National Institutes of Health, and in physiology and pharmacology at the Wake Forest School of Medicine under the guidance of Donald J Woodward, who pioneered the development of "awake-animal behavioral and multi-neuronal recording techniques" in the 1990s. Janak joined the faculty of the University of California, San Francisco as an assistant professor in the Ernest Gallo Clinic and Research Center in 1999. She was named the Howard J. Weinberger Endowed Chair in Addiction Research at USCF in 2011.

In June 2014, Janak was named a Bloomberg Distinguished Professor at Johns Hopkins University for her accomplishments as an interdisciplinary researcher and excellence in teaching. The Bloomberg Distinguished Professorship program was established in 2013 by a gift from Michael Bloomberg. Janak holds joint appointments in the Johns Hopkins University School of Arts and Sciences' Department of Psychological and Brain Sciences and the Johns Hopkins School of Medicine's Solomon H. Snyder Department of Neuroscience.

== Research ==
Janak is an investigator in the field of the biological basis of behavior working on associative learning. Her work empirically bridges formal learning theories and systems neuroscience in the mammalian brain. Using models based on theories of learning in combination with laboratory experiments, Janak investigates associative processes and the hierarchical organization of relational and representational neural encoding. Electrophysiological recordings from neurons in defined circuits are done using pharmacological and neurophysiological tools to manipulate circuit properties. She has a demonstrated interest in a translational approach to clinical conditions. The fundamental aspects of learning and memory in the models she studies are basic to a broad range of human behaviors and can serve as a guide to intervention and therapies when capacities fail to develop normally or break down through disease. Her most cited article, titled, "A causal link between prediction errors, dopamine neurons and learning," was published in 2013 in Nature Neuroscience.

Janak has 150 total publications, including 11 review papers, with more than 11,000 total citations and an H index of 59. She has been a member of the Society for Neuroscience since 1987 and the Research Society on Alcoholism since 1994. Janak has taught both undergraduate and graduate courses on a variety of topics including psychology, data analysis, behavioral neuroscience, and drug addiction. At Johns Hopkins, Janak is teaching graduate psychology and neuroscience courses and an undergraduate course on learning and memory, and actively participating in the interdisciplinary Science of Learning Institute.

In 2023 Janak was awarded Fellow of the American Association for the Advancement of Science.

== Publications ==
Janak has more than 15,000 citations in Google Scholar and an h-index of 68.

- Pubmed citations
- Google Scholar citations

Selected Publications

- 2015 with KM Tye, From circuits to behaviour in the amygdala, in: Nature. Vol. 517, nº 7534; 284–292.
- 2013 with EE Steinberg, R Keiflin, JR Boivin, IB Witten, K Deisseroth, A causal link between prediction errors, dopamine neurons and learning, in: Nature Neuroscience. Vol. 16, nº 7; 966–973.
- 2011 with IB Witten, EE Steinberg, SY Lee, TJ Davidson, KA Zalocusky, M Brodsky, et al., Recombinase-driver rat lines: tools, techniques, and optogenetic application to dopamine-mediated reinforcement, in: Neuron. Vol. 72, nº 5; 721–733.
- 2012 with LH Corbit, H Nie, Habitual alcohol seeking: time course and the contribution of subregions of the dorsal striatum, in: Biological Psychiatry. Vol. 72, nº 5; 389–395.
- 2004 with NNH McGough, DY He, ML Logrip, J Jeanblanc, K Phamluong, K Luong, V Kharazia, D Ron, RACK1 and brain-derived neurotrophic factor: a homeostatic pathway that regulates alcohol addiction, in: Journal of Neuroscience. Vol. 24, nº 46; 10542–10552.
- 2015 with R Keiflin, Dopamine prediction errors in reward learning and addiction: from theory to neural circuitry, in: Neuron. Vol. 88, nº 2; 247–263.

== See also ==
- Addiction psychology
- Associative learning
- Instrumental learning
- Pavlovian conditioning
- Neuropsychopharmacology
- Behavioral neuroscience
- Behavioral addiction
