= World Science Festival =

Annual science festival produced by the World Science Foundation

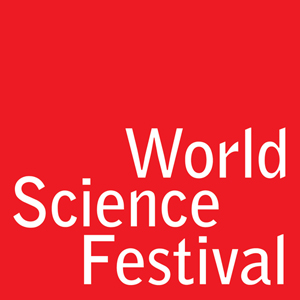
- The festival's logo
- Status: Active
- Genre: Science festival
- Frequency: Annually
- Venue: Various
- Locations: New York City, New York
- Country: United States
- Inaugurated: 2008
- Patrons: Founding benefactors: Simons Foundation, Alfred P. Sloan Foundation, and the John Templeton Foundation
- Sponsor: World Science Foundation
- Website: worldsciencefestival.com

The World Science Festival is an annual science festival hosted by the World Science Foundation, a 501(c)(3) nonprofit organization based in New York City. There is also an Asia-Pacific event held in Brisbane, Australia.

== History ==
The festival was founded by Brian Greene, a professor of mathematics and physics at Columbia University, and Tracy Day, a former television news producer and broadcast journalist. Greene is now chairman of the World Science Foundation and Day is executive of the World Science Festival.

Founding benefactors include the Simons Foundation, the Alfred P. Sloan Foundation, and the John Templeton Foundation.

== Board of directors ==
- Alan Alda
- Judith Cox
- Tracy Day
- Brian Greene
- Gillian Small
- Tamsen Ann Ziff

== Inaugural festival ==
The inaugural festival took place May 28 – June 1, 2008, at 22 venues in New York City. It included 46 events, a street festival, and the day-long World Science Summit at Columbia University. Participants included 150 speakers, scientists, and artists, among whom were 11 Nobel Prize laureates. Venues included the American Museum of Natural History, Abyssinian Baptist Church, and New York University's Skirball Center for the Performing Arts. The recorded attendance was over 120,000.

== World Science Festival venues ==
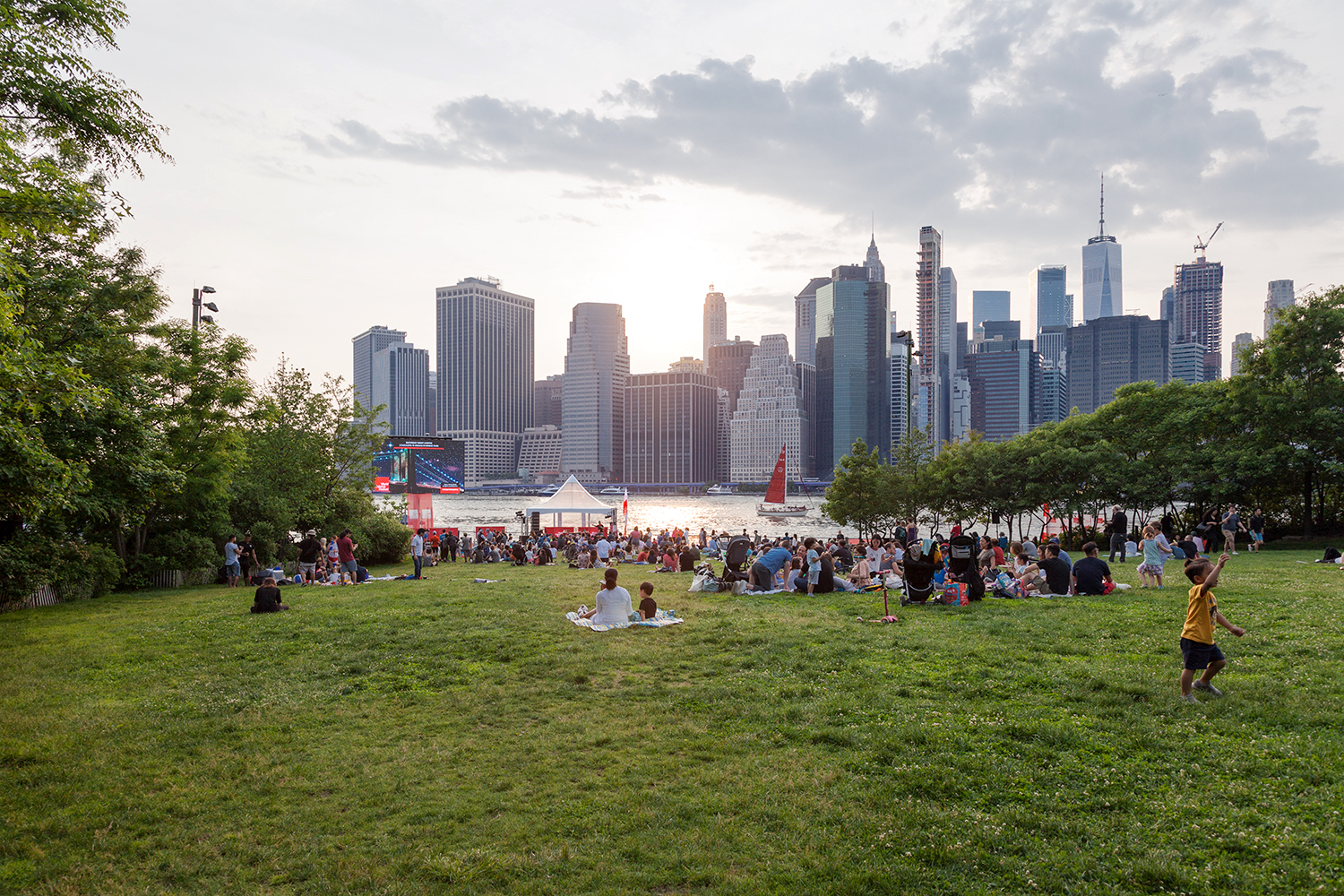
Audience preparing to watch "Deep Field: The Impossible Magnitude of our Universe" by Eric Whitacre in Brooklyn Bridge Park

=== New York City ===
Since its inception, the festival has reported over two million visitors alongside online viewership. Events include panel discussions, debates, theatrical productions, musical performances, and outdoor activities throughout New York City museums, parks, and galleries.

=== Brisbane ===
Since 2016, another event has been held each year in Brisbane, Australia. It is organized by Queensland Museum Network, which holds the exclusive license for in the Asia Pacific region from 2016 to 2021.

== Past participants ==
Past participants have included:

- Alan Alda
- Joshua Bell
- Chuck Close
- Glenn Close
- Sylvia Earle
- Philip Glass
- Maggie Gyllenhaal
- Stephen Hawking
- John Hockenberry
- Bill T. Jones
- Charlie Kaufman
- Mary-Claire King
- Eric Lander
- Richard Leakey
- John Lithgow
- Yo-Yo Ma
- Tim Maudlin
- Bobby McFerrin
- Oliver Sacks
- Liev Schreiber
- Anna Deavere Smith
- Julie Taymor
- E.O. Wilson

Nobel Laureates

The following Nobel Laureates have participated:

- David Baltimore
- Barry Barish
- Steven Chu
- David Gross
- Eric Kandel
- Dudley R. Herschbach
- Roald Hoffmann
- Leon Lederman
- Paul Nurse
- John C. Mather
- Saul Perlmutter
- Adam Riess
- F. Sherwood Rowland
- Horst Störmer
- Jack W. Szostak
- Kip Thorne
- Gerard ‘t Hooft
- Harold Varmus
- James Watson
- Steven Weinberg
- Rainer Weiss
- Carl Wieman
- Frank Wilczek

== Education ==
The organization operates educational initiatives directed at student and adult audiences.

=== World Science Scholars ===
The World Science Scholars program is a two-year initiative funded by the John Templeton Foundation for high school students with mathematical aptitude, providing mentorship from scientists and peer collaboration on topics such as particle physics, computational thinking, astrobiology, and string theory. Mentors and faculty participating in the program have included Brian Greene, Mandë Holford, Miguel Nicolelis, Stephen Wolfram, Cumrun Vafa, and Suzana Herculano-Houzel.

=== World Science U ===
World Science U offers everyone from high school students to adults the opportunity to explore science topics with researchers and educators.

== See also ==
- List of festivals in the United States
