= The Fabric of the Cosmos =

Book by Brian Greene

The Fabric of the Cosmos: Space, Time, and the Texture of Reality
- Softcover edition
- Author: Brian Greene
- Language: English
- Subject: Theoretical physics, cosmology, string theory
- Genre: Non-fiction
- Publisher: Alfred A. Knopf
- Publication date: 2004
- Publication place: United States
- Media type: Print
- Pages: 569
- ISBN: 0-375-41288-3
- OCLC: 52854030
- Dewey Decimal: 523.1 22
- LC Class: QB982 .G74 2004
- Preceded by: The Elegant Universe
- Followed by: Icarus at the Edge of Time

The Fabric of the Cosmos: Space, Time, and the Texture of Reality (2004) is a popular science book by Brian Greene, professor and co-director of Columbia's Institute for Strings, Cosmology, and Astroparticle Physics (ISCAP). It develops themes from his The Elegant Universe and explores the nature of space and time in modern physics.

== Introduction ==
Greene begins with the key question: "what is reality?", or more specifically, "what is spacetime?" He sets out to describe the features he finds both exciting and essential to forming a full picture of the reality painted by modern science. In almost every chapter, Greene introduces basic concepts and then slowly builds to a climax, usually a scientific breakthrough. Greene attempts to connect with his reader by posing simple analogies to help explain the meaning of a scientific concept without oversimplifying the theory behind it.

In the preface, Greene acknowledges that some parts of the book are controversial among scientists. He discusses the leading viewpoints in the main text and points of contention in the endnotes. The endnotes contain more complete explanations of points that are simplified in the main text.

== Summary ==
=== Part I: Reality's Arena ===
Part I focuses on space and time.

Chapter 1, "Roads to Reality" poses questions about the nature of space and time that are explored in the rest of the book. Greene recalls his youthful encounter with Albert Camus's The Myth of Sisyphus, which showed him the importance of knowledge.

Chapter 2, "The Universe and the Bucket" asks: "Is space a human abstraction or a physical entity?" The key thought experiment is a spinning bucket of water, designed to make one wonder about what creates the force felt inside the bucket when it is spinning. The ideas of Isaac Newton, Gottfried Leibniz and Ernst Mach are introduced. Newton said that the water in the bucket moves relative to absolute space; Leibniz and Mach disagreed.

Chapter 3, "Relativity and the Absolute" introduces Albert Einstein's theories of special and general relativity and asks, "Is spacetime an Einsteinian abstraction or a physical entity?"

Chapter 4, "Entangling Space" introduces quantum mechanics and asks, "What does it mean to be separate in a quantum universe?" Greene introduces spin, the double slit experiment and Heisenberg's uncertainty principle. He describes a paradox posed by Einstein, Boris Podolsky and Nathan Rosen, John Bell's theorem, and tests of it by Alain Aspect and others.

=== Part II: Time and Experience ===
Part II is about humanity's experience of time.

Chapter 5, "The Frozen River" asks "Does time flow?" Greene returns to special relativity and the relativity of simultaneity. The conclusion is that time does not flow, as all things simultaneously exist at the same time.

Chapter 6, "Chance and the Arrow" asks "Does time have a direction?" Greene introduces time-reversal symmetry, the fact that the laws of physics are symmetrical forward in time and backward in time. One of the major themes of this chapter is Ludwig Boltzmann's concept of entropy and the second law of thermodynamics.

Chapter 7, "Time and the Quantum" returns to quantum mechanics. Probability is a major theme of this chapter as it is an inescapable part of quantum mechanics. The double slit experiment is revisited. Many others are presented, such as John Archibald Wheeler's delayed-choice experiment and Marlan Scully's quantum eraser experiment. Greene introduces the measurement problem and concludes by discussing decoherence.

=== Part III: Spacetime and Cosmology ===
Part III deals with cosmology.

Chapter 8, "Of Snowflakes and Spacetime" states that the history of the universe is a history of symmetry. Greene returns to general relativity and discusses Edwin Hubble's discovery of an expanding universe. Greene argues that the Big Bang must be the state of minimum entropy.

Chapter 9, "Vaporizing the Vacuum" introduces the Higgs boson. Greene focuses on the critical first fraction of a second after the Big Bang, when the amount of symmetry in the universe was thought to have changed abruptly by a process known as symmetry breaking. This chapter also brings into play the theory of grand unification and entropy is also revisited.

Chapter 10, "Deconstructing the Bang" returns to the Big Bang, and asks "What banged?" An answer is provided by Alan Guth's inflationary cosmology, which also answers the horizon and flatness problems Greene discusses the cosmological constant, introduced to general relativity by Einstein to stave off an expanding universe. The cosmological constant has made a comeback with the discovery of dark energy. Another unsolved mystery is the nature of dark matter.

Chapter 11, "Quanta in the Sky with Diamonds" develops the themes of inflation and the arrow of time. Greene addresses three main developments: the formation of structures such as galaxies, the amount of energy required to spawn the universe we now see, and the origin of the arrow of time.

=== Part IV: Origins and Unification ===
Part IV introduces the conflict between general relativity and quantum mechanics, and how it might be resolved.

Chapter 12, "The World on a String" introduces Greene's field, string theory. Ideas from The Elegant Universe are revisited. The reader learns how string theory could fill the gaps between general relativity and quantum mechanics.

Chapter 13, "The Universe on a Brane" introduces M-theory and its implications for space and time. The focus of the chapter becomes gravity and its involvement with extra dimensions. Near the end of the chapter, a brief section is devoted to the cyclic model.

=== Part V: Reality and Imagination ===
Part V discusses efforts to test the theories described, and their speculative applications.

Chapter 14, "Up in the Heavens and Down on the Earth" introduces efforts to test predictions of general relativity like frame-dragging and gravitational waves. Greene returns to Higgs theory and string theory and how they might be tested experimentally.

Chapter 15, "Teleporters and Time Machines" addresses travel through space and time through exotic means. Quantum mechanics is reintroduced when Greene discusses quantum teleportation which, thanks to the work of Anton Zeilinger and others, is not science fiction. General relativity is revisited to address the possibility of time travel through wormholes. Greene discusses paradoxes that arise with travel to the past; David Deutsch suggests that they could be resolved through the many worlds interpretation of quantum mechanics.

Chapter 16, "The Future of an Allusion" discusses the future of space and time. It is possible that spacetime may emerge from something deeper. Another possibility is that space and time atomic in nature. Greene introduces loop quantum gravity and the possibility that it and string theory are pointing towards a single theory of quantum gravity.

== Reception ==
Freeman Dyson wrote "I recommend Greene’s book to any nonexpert reader who wants an up-to-date account of theoretical physics, written in colloquial language that anyone can understand. ... Greene’s book explains to the nonexpert reader two essential themes of modern science. First it describes the historical path of observation and theory that led from Newton and Galileo in the seventeenth century to Einstein and Stephen Hawking in the twentieth. Then it shows us the style of thinking that led beyond Einstein and Hawking to the fashionable theories of today. The history and the style of thinking are authentic, whether or not the fashionable theories are here to stay."

Josie Glausiusz of Discover named it one of the best science books of 2004, writing: "Greene delves into and illuminates some of the most perplexing questions of contemporary cosmology in a reader-friendly chronicle of brilliant clarity."

Janet Maslin wrote "his excitement for science on the threshold of vital breakthroughs is supremely contagious. The Fabric of the Cosmos is as dazzling as it is tough, and it beautifully reflects this theoretician's ardor for his work. In interviews he is sometimes asked where the next generation of physicists will come from. One clear answer: from the brain-teasing, exhilarating study of books like this."

== Adaptation ==
NOVA made a documentary sequel to the popular Elegant Universe adaptation based on this book The Fabric of the Cosmos and with the same name. The series is hosted by Greene and includes commentary by numerous other renowned physicists, such as Max Tegmark and others.

This documentary series is composed of 4 episodes (5–8 of season 39, 2011–2012) of the Nova television series:

1. The Fabric of the Cosmos: What is Space?
2. The Fabric of the Cosmos: The Illusion of Time
3. The Fabric of the Cosmos: Quantum Leap
4. The Fabric of the Cosmos: Universe or Multiverse?

Lynn Elber of Associated Press called it, "Mind-blowing TV."

== Publication data ==
- The Fabric of the Cosmos: Space, Time, and the Texture of Reality (2004). Alfred A. Knopf division, Random House, ISBN 0-375-41288-3

== See also ==
- A Brief History of Time (1988)
- The Fabric of Reality (1997)
- The Elegant Universe (1999)
- The Universe in a Nutshell (2001)
- The Road to Reality (2004)
