= Mars: The Secret Science =

American documentary TV series

- Genre: Documentary series
- Narrated by: David O'Brien
- Country of origin: United States
- Original language: English
- No. of seasons: 2
- No. of episodes: 10

Production
- Running time: 43 minutes

Original release
- Network: Science Channel
- Release: November 14, 2016 – December 10, 2018

Mars: The Secret Science is a documentary science television series narrated by David O'Brien broadcast on the Science Channel in 2016 and 2018.

== Content ==
Mars: The Secret Science looks at how scientists and modern explorers are working to get humans to Mars. The series both explores Mars and chronicles how the National Aeronautics and Space Administration (NASA) is building rockets and spacecraft to carry astronauts there and how technology visionaries are designing Martian colonies. The series also looks at issues such as the design of spacesuits for use on Mars and of the vehicles humans will need for transportation there.

In 2018, the Science Channel broadcast specials under the title Mars: The Secret Science, some of which consisted entirely of segments broadcast previously in episodes of Mars: The Secret Science, How the Universe Works, The Planets and Beyond, and Strip the Cosmos .

== Episode list ==
=== Season 1 (2016) ===
No.	Title	Original release date
1	"Race to the Red Planet"	November 14, 2016
The National Aeronautics and Space Administration (NASA) is building its first spacecraft to carry astronauts to Mars, and technology visionaries are devising extraterrestrial colonies. They might make a human future on Mars a reality.
2	"Is There Life?"	November 21, 2016
An examination of NASA's Curiosity mission to Mars and its search for signs of life there.
3	"Conquering the New Frontier"	November 28, 2016
A visit behind the scenes at SpaceX, where Elon Musk explains his quest to colonize Mars.
4	"Mars's Deepest Mysteries"	December 5, 2016
A look at what lies beneath the surface of Mars.
5	"NASA's Most Dangerous Mission"	December 12, 2016
A look at the rockets and spacecraft NASA is planning to build to carry humans to Mars, and how astronauts are training to live in and operate them.
6	"Secret History of a Rover"	December 19, 2016
An examination of the Curiosity rover — the largest, heaviest, and most technologically advanced piece of equipment ever sent to Mars — and how NASA built it.

=== Specials (2018) ===
No.	Title	Directed by	Original release date
Special	"Mysteries on the Red Planet"	Unknown	November 12, 2018
Mars could be humanity's first step in space colonization, and new discoveries reveal answers to Mars's greatest mysteries. This special consists of segments previously aired as part of the Strip the Cosmos episode "Expedition Mars" (Season 1, Episode 4), the Space's Deepest Secrets episode "Mars: The Next Frontier" (Season 4, Episode 7), and the Mars: The Secret Science episode "Is There Life?" (Season 1, Episode 2).
Special	"The Alien Riddles"	Unknown	November 26, 2018
Life may once have existed on Mars, and as SpaceX, NASA, and other modern-day explorers plan ambitious new missions there, life may one day return to the planet. This special consists of segments previously aired as part of the Mars: The Secret Science episode "Conquering the New Frontier" (Season 1, Episode 3) and the How the Universe Works episode "Life and Death on the Red Planet" (Season 5, Episode 6).
Special	"NASA's Mission to Mars: InSight Lander"	Unknown	November 26, 2018
After NASA's InSight lander arrived on Mars, NASA scientists began to examine images and data from the groundbreaking mission, making new discoveries that could change everything they know about the planet.
Special	"The New Space Race"	Unknown	December 10, 2018
Experts are developing new spacecraft and technologies to bring astronauts to Mars, and their work already has led to new discoveries that give humanity a new understanding of Mars. This special consists of segments previously aired as part of the Mars: The Secret Science episode "Is There Life?"(Season 1, Episode 2), The Planets (later The Planets and Beyond) episode "Mars: The Definitive Guide" (Season 1, Episode 2), and the Mars: the Secret Science episode "Race to the Red Planet" (Season 1, Episode 1).

== See also ==
- Alien Planet
- Cosmos: A Spacetime Odyssey
- Extreme Universe
- How the Universe Works
- Into the Universe with Stephen Hawking
- Killers of the Cosmos
- Space's Deepest Secrets
- Strip the Cosmos
- Through the Wormhole
- The Universe
