= Extreme Universe =

2010 British documentary TV series

- DVD cover
- Narrated by: Dominic Frisby
- Country of origin: United Kingdom
- No. of series: 1
- No. of episodes: 6

Production
- Running time: 6 x 47 min

Original release
- Network: National Geographic Channel
- Release: 11 June – 21 June 2010

Extreme Universe is a documentary about extremeness of our Universe. It consists of 6 episodes. The series is written by Rob Blumenstein and John Coll Metcalfe.

== Episode List ==
No.	Title	Original release date
1	"Is Anybody Out There?"	11 June 2010
Travel to the farthest reaches of the universe, as this exploratory space documentary series asks 'is anyone out there'?
2	"Collision Course"	13 June 2010
Witness some of the most violent impacts in the universe, and meet the people protecting us from the fallout of these cosmic collisions.
3	"Space Storms"	15 June 2010
Witness the relentless power of Earth's worst weather, before travelling the universe to find the 17,500kmh winds and methane storms of space.
4	"Edge of Space"	17 June 2010
Delve into the unknown on a journey into deep oceans and deep space, as we seek the answers to some of mankind's most unfathomable questions.
5	"Time Bombs"	19 June 2010
Planets, moons and stars can all face violent upheaval at any moment. Is it possible to predict when Mother Nature will strike.
6	"Star Gate"	21 June 2010
Throughout history, humans have been fascinated by the stars. Discover how astronomy played a crucial role in early civilisations.

== See also ==
- How the Universe Works
- Killers of the Cosmos
- The Planets and Beyond
- Space's Deepest Secrets
- Strip the Cosmos
- Through the Wormhole
- The Universe
- Stephen Hawking's Universe
