= Planet (disambiguation) =

A planet, in astronomy, is one of a class of celestial bodies that orbit stars. (A dwarf planet is a similar, but officially mutually exclusive, class of body.)

- For articles on specific types of planet, see List of planets

Planet or Planets may also refer to:

- Planets in astrology, celestial bodies used in prophecy
- The planet, a term often used to refer to Earth
- planetary mass object

== As an acronym ==
- Professional Landcare Network, a US organization for lawn care, landscape architecture and related professionals
- Probing Lensing Anomalies Network, a network of optical astronomical telescopes used for photometry
- Postal Alpha Numeric Encoding Technique, a barcoding system for sorting mail used by the US Postal Service

== Computing ==
- Planet (software), software for collecting posts from RSS feeds and republishing them on a website
- Planet Network, network of video game-related websites operated by GameSpy
- Planet Online, UK Internet service provider
- Planet (franchise), video game franchise by Frontier Developments
- The Planet Internet Services, large dedicated hosting service provider

== Film and television ==
- The Planet (film), a 2006 Swedish documentary film
- The Planets (film), 1983
- The Planets, first-season title of The Planets and Beyond, a Science Channel documentary series
- The Planets (1999 TV series), a BBC TV documentary series
- The Planets (2019 TV series), a BBC TV documentary series presented by Professor Brian Cox
- Planète (TV channel), a French television channel, now known as Planète+
- Planetes, 2003 Sunrise, Inc. manga and anime television series
- Planet or Captain Planet, character in Captain Planet and the Planeteers

== Magazines and newspapers ==
- Planet (magazine), a Welsh cultural and political quarterly
- Planet Magazine, on-line science fiction magazine
- Planet PC, a British computer gaming magazine
- Planet Stories, science fiction magazine published from 1939–1955
- Planète (review), a French magazine of the fantastic realism literary movement
- Daily Planet, a fictional newspaper in the Superman universe

== Music ==
- The Planets, a suite of orchestral music by Gustav Holst
- The Planets (band), a classical music band formed by Mike Batt
- Planets (Adema album), by Adema
- Planets, an album by the art rock band One Ring Zero
- Planets (Eloy album), by the German band Eloy from 1982
- "Planets" (song), a 2010 song by the Australian pop-rock band Short Stack
- "Planet", a song from the album Chapter 1. Our Youth by BXB
- "Planet", a song from the album Here Today, Tomorrow Next Week! by The Sugarcubes
- Planet, a series of EPs by Basement Jaxx
- "Planets", a song by Avenged Sevenfold from Hail to the King
- The Planet (album), by Young Ejecta
- "The Planet", a 2023 song by BTS

== Transport ==
- Planet (locomotive), an early British steam railway locomotive
- 'Planet' trademark for petrol locomotives produced by Kent Construction and Engineering Ltd in England after WW1
- 2-2-0, a class of railway locomotives including the latter
- Planet Airways, a US airline
- Cagiva Planet, an Italian motorcycle
- The PLANET series of Japanese uncrewed spacecraft:
  - PLANET-A, alternative name for Suisei (probe)
  - PLANET-B, alternative name for Nozomi (probe)
  - PLANET-C, alternative name for Akatsuki (probe)
- Name of several German oceanographic research vessels:
  - SMS Planet (1905), survey ship of the Kaiserliche Marine
  - Planet (1967), research vessel of the German Navy
  - Planet (2005), research vessel of the German Navy

== Sport ==
- "The Planets", nickname given to Kenyan association football club Ligi Ndogo S.C.
- Planet (horse), a racing horse

== Other uses ==
- Planet Records (Australian record label), a defunct Australian record label
- Planet, a Jacques Vert retail clothing brand
- Planet (company), a financial services company specialised in multicurrency payments, credit card processing and the management of Tax-free shopping
- Planet Labs, an American public Earth imaging company
- Planet Marathi, Indian film production company
- Planet Marathi OTT, Indian OTT platform

== See also ==
- Planetary (disambiguation)
- Planet Wikimedia, a blog aggregator operated by the Wikimedia Foundation, to bring together on-topic posts about wikis from Wikimedia community members.
