= Killers of the Cosmos =

American documentary television series

- Genre: Documentary series
- Narrated by: Aidan Gillen
- Country of origin: United States
- Original language: English
- No. of seasons: 1
- No. of episodes: 6

Production
- Producer: Nigel Paterson
- Running time: 40–43 minutes
- Production company: Wall to Wall Media

Original release
- Network: Science Channel
- Release: September 19 – October 24, 2021

Aidan Gillen hosts Killers of the Cosmos in animated form as the Gumshoe Detective.

Promotional image for Killers of the Cosmos

Killers of the Cosmos is a documentary science television series hosted by Aidan Gillen. Aired by the Science Channel, it premiered on September 19, 2021.

== Format ==
In a format the Science Channel describes as "space noir," Killers of the Cosmos explores possible lethal threats the cosmos poses to life on Earth through the "investigations" of a private investigator—the "Gumshoe Detective," modeled in the style of a character in a Raymond Chandler novel—portrayed by Aidan Gillen in animated form. In scripted dramatic sequences combining the characteristics of film noir with those of a pulp fiction graphic novel set in the mid-20th century, the Gumshoe Detective hosts each episode. Aided by a mysterious informant portrayed by Sarah Winter, the detective takes on a "case" and hunts down a "killer" by exploring a lethal threat the cosmos poses to humanity. The animated sequences link conventional live-action documentary segments in which experts in astronomy, astrophysics, cosmology, planetary science, biology, and aerospace engineering describe and explain phenomena that could threaten the Earth, how they pose a threat, what would happen on Earth if they actually took place, the likelihood of them occurring, and how to counter them.

== Production ==
Wall to Wall Media produced Killers of the Cosmos. The executive producers for Wall to Wall Media were Tim Lambert and Jeremy Dear and for Discovery, Inc., were Caroline Perez, Abram Sitzer and Wyatt Channell. The series producer was Nigel Paterson. Ben Scott directed the episodes.

== Episode list ==
No.	Title	Directed by	Original release date
1	"The Case of the Killer Rocks"	Ben Scott	September 19, 2021
Earth is hit by 100 tons of rock from space every day. Most space rocks burn up in the atmosphere, but a single rock wiped out the dinosaurs. Could it happen again—and does the same fate await humans?
2	"The Case of the Dark Star"	Ben Scott	September 26, 2021
There are millions of black holes, some of which are rogues which speed through space. Could one of them destroy the Earth?
3	"The Case of the Death Ray"	Ben Scott	October 3, 2021
Gamma rays strike the Earth every day. When a massive star dies, it can direct a gamma-ray burst into the cosmos, and if such a burst struck the Earth, it would obliterate all life on the planet. What are the chances of a gamma-ray burst striking the Earth itself and destroying humanity?
4	"The Case of the Cosmic Scrap"	Ben Scott	October 10, 2021
Some 6,000 artificial satellites and more than 100 million pieces of man-made space debris orbit the Earth, all traveling faster than a bullet, and the numbers increase every year. About 60 percent of the satellites are dead, and no longer under human control. Someday, a collision between only two satellites or pieces of debris could lead to a catastrophic chain reaction of collisions that would cause a communications meltdown affecting the entire planet.
5	"The Case of the Little Green Men"	Ben Scott	October 17, 2021
Hundreds of billions of planets exist in our galaxy alone, and the odds suggest that alien civilizations probably exist on some of them. Someday, aliens might visit the Earth. Would they be a threat to human life—lethal killers intent on invading the Earth and plundering it?
6	"The Case of the Big Sleep"	Ben Scott	October 24, 2021
Even the universe will come to an end. When will the end come? And how will the universe end? Will gravity make it collapse, or will it expand forever, or will dark energy rip the fabric of space apart?

== See also ==
- Alien Planet
- Cosmos: A Spacetime Odyssey
- Extreme Universe
- How the Universe Works
- Into the Universe with Stephen Hawking
- The Planets and Beyond
- Space's Deepest Secrets
- Strip the Cosmos
- Through the Wormhole
- The Universe
