= Brave New World with Stephen Hawking =

2011 science documentary television mini-series

- Starring: Stephen Hawking
- Country of origin: United Kingdom
- Original language: English
- No. of series: 1
- No. of episodes: 5

Production
- Running time: 46 mins

Original release
- Network: Channel 4
- Release: 31 October – 21 November 2011

Brave New World with Stephen Hawking is a 2011 science documentary television mini-series presented by Professor Stephen Hawking who examines how science is striving for humankind's next leap forward.

The series has been released in DVD format on 16 October 2012 and includes a 16-page viewer's guide.

== Episodes ==
Episode 1 : Machines
Episode 2 : Health
Episode 3 : Technology
Episode 4 : Environment
Episode 5 : Biology

== See also ==
- Into the Universe with Stephen Hawking
- Stephen Hawking's Universe
