= How the Universe Works =

Documentary science television series

- Blu-ray disc cover
- Also known as: HtUW
- Genre: Documentary series, Space Exploration, Science and Technology
- Narrated by: Mike Rowe (Seasons 1, 4, 5, 6, 7, 9, 10 and 11); Erik Todd Dellums (Seasons 2, 3, 5, 6 and 8)
- Composer: Richard Blair-Oliphant
- Country of origin: United States
- Original language: English
- No. of seasons: 11
- No. of episodes: 93 (list of episodes)

Production
- Executive producers: Hannah James; Stuart Carter
- Producer: Stephen Marsh
- Running time: 43 minutes
- Production company: Pioneer Productions

Original release
- Network: Discovery Channel (2010); Science Channel (2012–2023)
- Release: April 25, 2010 – April 2, 2023

How The Universe Works is a science documentary television series that provides scientific explanations about the inner workings of the universe and everything it encompasses. With the use of computer-generated imagery (CGI) and visual effects, each episode presents and narrates a topic about the universe (e.g.: the origin of the universe, the formation and the evolution of the Solar System, and the origin and behavior of life), which then are complemented with scientific insights from leading scientists of organizations such as NASA and CERN.

The series originally aired on the Discovery Channel in 2010. It features different narrators for each episode per season, specifically Mike Rowe, Erik Todd Dellums, and Richard Lintern. Rowe, who narrated the first season of the show, liked to think that the idea of changing narrators through several seasons were "a collision of alternative universes," that "the same TV show narrated by me in this universe, could be narrated by someone else in an alternative universe."

The first season, which was broadcast on the Discovery Channel from April 25 to May 24, 2010, was released on Blu-ray on February 28, 2012. Since its second season, consisting of eight episodes broadcast between July 11 and August 29, 2012, the show has aired on the Science Channel. The third season aired between July 9 and September 3, 2014.

The fourth season premiered on July 14, 2015, as part of the Science Channel's "Space Week," in honor of New Horizons' flyby of Pluto that day; the season ran through September 1, 2015. The show's fifth season aired from November 22, 2016, through February 7, 2017.

The sixth season premiered on January 9, 2018, and ran through March 13, 2018. The seventh season premiered on January 8, 2019. On December 30, 2019, it was announced that the eighth season would premiere on January 2, 2020.

The ninth season premiered on March 24, 2021. The tenth season premiered on March 6, 2022. The eleventh season premiered on March 5, 2023.

According to the site The Futon Critic, since its eleventh season ended, the show is on hiatus; no new seasons of the show have been announced, it is possible that the show has been cancelled although there is no evidence or officially confirmed.

== Episode list ==
Season	Episodes	Originally released	
Season	Episodes	First released	Last released
1	8	April 25, 2010	May 24, 2010
2	8	July 11, 2012	August 29, 2012
3	9	July 9, 2014	September 3, 2014
4	8	July 14, 2015	September 1, 2015
5	9	November 22, 2016	February 7, 2017
6	10	January 9, 2018	March 13, 2018
7	10	January 8, 2019	March 12, 2019
8	9	January 2, 2020	February 27, 2020
9	11	March 24, 2021	June 2, 2021
10	6	March 6, 2022	April 10, 2022
11	5	March 5, 2023	April 2, 2023

=== Season 1 (2010) ===
No. overall	No. in series	Title	Directed by	Original release date
1	1	"Big Bang"	Louise V. Say	April 25, 2010
The program investigates how the Universe came into existence out of nothing, and how it grew from a minuscule point, smaller than an atomic particle, to the vast cosmos seen today.
2	2	"Black Holes"	Peter Chinn	May 2, 2010
Black holes, the most powerful destroyers in the Universe, the most mysterious phenomena in the heavens. For years, they were only speculation; now, modern astronomy is proving their existence.
3	3	"Galaxies"	Louise V. Say	May 10, 2010
Galaxies, home to stars and planets, come in all shapes and sizes. Witnesses the evolution of galaxies; from clouds of cold gas floating in the voids of space 13 billion years ago to the spirals that fill the night sky.
4	4	"Stars"	Peter Chinn	May 10, 2010
The story of how stars were made by the Universe and how stars then went on to engineer everything else in the universe. They changed the Universe by spawning further generations of stars, then planets, and eventually the building blocks of life.
5	5	"Supernovas"	Shaun Trevisick	May 17, 2010
Stars are not eternal; they are dying in large explosions called supernovas. Second only to the Big Bang, these explosions are where creation and destruction meet.
6	6	"Planets"	Lorne Townend	May 17, 2010
There are eight planets in the Solar System, but there could be a hundred billion planets in the Milky Way galaxy alone. This show follows the journey of planets as they grow from grains of dust to the magnificently diverse worlds.
7	7	"Solar Systems"	Lorne Townend	May 24, 2010
Is the Solar System unique? Since the first discovery of a planet orbiting another star, some 280 alien planetary systems have been identified.
8	8	"Moons"	Shaun Trevisick	May 24, 2010
Moons come in many possible shapes and sizes. Home to incredible natural phenomena like gigantic geysers and colossal volcanoes, moons also offer perhaps the best chance of finding alien life in the Universe — and they probably exist in the billions.

=== Season 2 (2012) ===
No. overall	No. in series	Title	Directed by	Original release date
9	1	"Volcanoes - The Furnaces of Life"	Alex Hearle	July 11, 2012
Scientists are discovering volcanoes on worlds once thought dead. From our nearest planetary neighbor to tiny moons billions of miles away, today we are discovering volcanoes on alien worlds.
10	2	"Megastorms - The Winds of Creation"	Alex Hearle	July 18, 2012
On Earth, violent and destructive storms create new opportunities for life. In our quest to discover if life on Earth is alone in the universe, scientists look for weather.
11	3	"Exoplanets - Planets from Hell"	Kate Dart	July 25, 2012
Over the last few decades, astronomers have discovered an extraordinary zoo of planetary nightmares outside the Solar System, all of them truly wild worlds.
12	4	"Megaflares - Cosmic Firestorms"	Kate Dart	August 1, 2012
The Universe is a magnetic minefield. The Sun creates flares capable of battering life on Earth. But space also contains other dangerous megaflares.
13	5	"Extreme Orbits - Clockwork and Creation"	Adam Warner	August 8, 2012
The only reason life on Earth is possible is because of its stable orbit around the Sun. Elsewhere in the Universe, orbits are chaotic, violent, and destructive. On the largest scale, orbits are a creative force and construct the fabric of the Universe.
14	6	"Comets - Frozen Wanderers"	Adam Warner	August 15, 2012
Follows the odyssey of a comet as it sails through space as it evolves from a chunk of ice and rock into an active nucleus engulfed in a gaseous haze.
15	7	"Asteroids - Worlds that Never Were"	George Harris	August 22, 2012
From icy worlds with more fresh water than Earth to flying mountains of pure metal, asteroids shaped Earth's past and promise much for the future. These enigmatic space rocks may hold the key to how life in the Universe arises and is extinguished.
16	8	"Birth of the Earth"	George Harris	August 29, 2012
The Earth was formed by a series of cosmic cataclysms, including the most powerful blast in the Universe. Explores how the same chain of events may have created other Earths elsewhere.

=== Season 3 (2014) ===
No. overall	No. in series	Title	Directed by	Original release date
17	1	"Journey from the Center of the Sun"	FTC	July 9, 2014
Shows how light escape from the Sun by a journey from the center of the Sun, following the path of light. Explores lights fiery birth in the core, its 430,000-mile (690,000 km) battle against gravity and magnetism, and its escape from the solar surface.
18	2	"The End of the Universe"	Mark Bridge	July 16, 2014
How and when will the Universe end? Gravity and dark matter are poised to annihilate the Universe in a Big Crunch. Expansion and dark energy may tear it apart, or a phase transition could end the universe in a cosmic death bubble.
19	3	"Jupiter: Destroyer or Savior?"	Mark Bridge	July 23, 2014
Beneath Jupiter's swirling clouds lie some of the Solar System's deepest secrets, from its violent youth, through the birth of life, to the death of the Sun. Now, scientists are unlocking these secrets and discovering that every living thing exists thanks to Jupiter.
20	4	"First Second of the Big Bang"	Mark Bridge	July 30, 2014
The first second of the Universe, the creation of everything when space, time, matter, and energy burst into existence. It is the most important second in history, which seals the Universe's fate and defines everything that comes after.
21	5	"Is Saturn Alive?"	Mark Bridge	August 6, 2014
Saturn's ferocious weather, its evolving ring system, and the discovery of active geology on its moons has rewritten the textbooks. Scientists are looking for life on Saturn's moons and they may have found it on Titan.
22	6	"Weapons of Mass Extinction"	Mark Bridge	August 13, 2014
An overview of historical mass extinctions and what is in store for the future.
23	7	"Did a Black Hole Build the Milky Way?"	Mark Bridge	August 20, 2014
Explores what built the Milky Way. At the heart of the galaxy sits a supermassive black hole, one of the most destructive objects in the Universe.
24	8	"Our Voyage to the Stars"	Mark Bridge	August 27, 2014
One day, a cosmic disaster will make life on Earth impossible. To survive, humans must find a new home amongst the stars. Scientists are already developing new propulsion systems to take people to these distant worlds.
25	9	"The Search for a Second Earth"	Mark Bridge	September 3, 2014
Other Earths may exist with liquid oceans, rocky continents, and life. Astronomers search with spectroscopy, direct imaging, and telescopes for evidence of atmospheres, magnetospheres, and signs of life.

=== Season 4 (2015) ===
No. overall	No. in series	Title	Directed by	Original release date
26	1	"How the Universe Built Your Car"	Mark Bridge	July 14, 2015
Show how beneath the hood of a car lies the history of the Universe. The iron in the chassis, the gold in the stereo, and the copper in the electronics all owe their existence to violent cosmic events that took place billions of years ago.
27	2	"Earth, Venus's Evil Twin"	Mark Bridge	July 21, 2015
Venus is a hellish planet, covered in thick dense clouds and roasted by colossal temperatures. This may be a vision of Earth's future.
28	3	"Monster Black Hole"	Mark Bridge	July 28, 2015
Black holes are the least understood places in the universe, where the rules of physics collapse. The show "goes inside" the supermassive black hole at the center of the Milky Way.
29	4	"Edge of the Solar System"	Mark Bridge	August 4, 2015
Giant magnetic bubbles millions of miles wide, bizarre invisible matter, and a death star tearing through bands of icy comets, flinging them into violent orbits. All this may be inside our cosmic backyard, and effecting the lives on Earth.
30	5	"Dawn of Life"	Mark Bridge	August 11, 2015
The origin of life on Earth is a hotly contested scientific debate. It may have come from strange volcanic hatcheries deep under the sea, or even from another planet.
31	6	"Secret History of the Moon"	Mark Bridge	August 18, 2015
The Moon is stranger than humans think, and they can thank the Moon for life on Earth. Explores the tunnels beneath the Moon's surface and asks if a lunar base may be key to humanity's future in space.
32	7	"The First Oceans"	Mark Bridge	August 25, 2015
For years, scientists suspected that the oceans came from molecules delivered to Earth from distant stars by asteroids, but a new discovery suggests that their true origins may be more exotic.
33	8	"Forces of Mass Construction"	Mark Bridge	September 1, 2015
Magnetism has shaped the cosmos, and without it, creation would simply disintegrate. This episode follows scientists trying to understand how magnetism works.

=== Season 5 (2016–17) ===
No. overall	No. in series	Title	Directed by	Original release date
34	1	"Most Amazing Discoveries"	Unknown	November 22, 2016
From the furthest reaches of space to Earth's cosmic backyard, the episode counts down the discoveries that changed everything humans know about the universe.
35	2	"Mystery of Planet 9"	Unknown	November 29, 2016
Scientists have discovered a mysterious ninth planet on the edge of the Solar System. Ten times the size of Earth, this world could have moons with extraterrestrial life.
36	3	"Black Holes: The Secret Origin"	Unknown	December 6, 2016
Explores why black holes grow so massive.
37	4	"Secret History of Pluto"	Unknown	January 3, 2017
Astronomers discovered a many icy objects orbiting around Pluto. Renewed interest was piqued, especially after the New Horizons probe took some high-resolution photos of Pluto in 2015.
38	5	"Stars That Kill"	Unknown	January 10, 2017
The universe is home to real-life Death Stars that could destroy Earth. The latest science reveals the terrifying secrets of NASA's six deadliest: Cataclysmic variable stars, supernovas that can vaporize a planet, and unpredictable intergalactic stars.
39	6	"The Universe's Deadliest"	Unknown	January 17, 2017
A guide to the worst places in the universe, including Betelgeuse in its death throes, which could become a supernova and the possibly a death star.
40	7	"Life and Death on the Red Planet"	Unknown	January 24, 2017
Possible life on Mars went through a series of life-impacting events, and the first impact may have seeded life on Earth via Martian debris.
41	8	"The Dark Matter Enigma"	Unknown	January 31, 2017
Dark matter is the biggest mystery of the cosmos. Scientists know that it has been vital to the universe since its beginning, and new discoveries reveal that it could create black holes, cause mass extinctions, and might even have helped to shape life on Earth. Explores if there may be a dark matter universe that could account for all the events that aren't yet definable.
42	9	"Strangest Alien Worlds"	Unknown	February 7, 2017
Discoveries of new planets have revealed many worlds much stranger than Earth. Some of these worlds don't have stars, others are made out of diamonds.

=== Season 6 (2018) ===
No. overall	No. in series	Title	Directed by	Original release date	U.S. viewers (millions)
43	1	"Are Black Holes Real?"	Unknown	January 9, 2018	0.375
New discoveries are challenging everything known about black holes -- astronomers are beginning to question if they even exist. The latest science tries to explain how they work and what they look like, despite the fact that at the time of this broadcast astronomers had never seen one.
44	2	"Twin Suns: The Alien Mysteries"	Unknown	January 16, 2018	0.385
Planets that orbit two stars instead of one might be deadly hell worlds, but new discoveries reveal that star systems with binary stars might be optimal places for alien life.
45	3	"Dark History of the Solar System"	Unknown	January 23, 2018	0.347
New discoveries reveal that Earth and the planets were formed from the destruction of strange alien worlds.
46	4	"Death of the Milky Way"	Unknown	January 30, 2018	0.341
The Milky Way is dying, and experts are investigating what's killing it.
47	5	"Uranus & Neptune: Rise of the Ice Giants"	Mark Bridge	February 6, 2018	0.378
Uranus and Neptune are mysterious, icy worlds at the edge of the Solar System, and new discoveries reveal that these planets may have helped start life on Earth.
48	6	"Secret History of Mercury"	Unknown	February 13, 2018	0.346
Mercury is a deadly world, facing attacks from the Sun, comets, and other planets, and even though it's the smallest planet in the Solar System it has a secret that might one day threaten life on Earth.
49	7	"The Quasar Enigma"	Unknown	February 20, 2018	0.371
Quasars are the brightest and most powerful objects in the universe, and though they have shaped the cosmos they might ultimately destroy everything that exists.
50	8	"Strange Lives of Dwarf Planets"	Unknown	February 27, 2018	0.302
The Solar System is home to hundreds of tiny worlds called dwarf planets, and new discoveries reveal their secrets.
51	9	"War on Asteroids"	Unknown	March 6, 2018	0.333
Scientists use cutting-edge technology to stop an asteroid apocalypse, and mankind is closer than ever to keeping Earth safe from these killer space rocks.
52	10	"Mystery of Spacetime"	Unknown	March 13, 2018	0.395
Spacetime is the four-dimensional structure that controls the universe, including time, light, and energy. It will also determine how the universe will end.

=== Season 7 (2019) ===
No. overall	No. in series	Title	Directed by	Original release date	U.S. viewers (millions)
53	1	"Nightmares of Neutron Stars"	Unknown	January 8, 2019	0.394
Neutron stars are violent phenomena that defy the laws of physics, and new discoveries reveal that these stars are far more deadly than scientists had thought, and have the power to destroy planets and even other stars.
54	2	"When Supernovas Strike"	Unknown	January 15, 2019	0.252
Supernovas are the violent death of giant stars, and these cataclysmic events create the elements that are essential to all life in the universe.
55	3	"The Interstellar Mysteries"	Unknown	January 22, 2019	N/A
Interstellar space between the universe's stars is not empty and unremarkable, as previously thought, but filled with objects and phenomena that may hold the darkest secrets of the cosmos.
56	4	"How Black Holes Made Us"	Unknown	January 29, 2019	0.326
Black holes aren't violent monsters as commonly believed, and new discoveries reveal that they might have been essential to creating stars, giving light, and building the universe.
57	5	"Secret World of Nebulas"	Unknown	February 5, 2019	N/A
Nebulas are structures of cosmic gas and dust where stars are created and end, and new discoveries reveal the secrets of these objects.
58	6	"Did the Big Bang Really Happen?"	Unknown	February 12, 2019	0.270
New discoveries are causing astronomers to question if the Big Bang really happened, and using the latest science they investigate if it wasn't just the start of the universe humans are aware of but of multiverses.
59	7	"Battle of the Dark Universe"	Unknown	February 19, 2019	0.222
Dark matter and dark energy compete for control of the cosmos, and the winner will determine the fate of the universe. New discoveries might reveal which force will emerge victorious.
60	8	"Hunt for Alien Life"	Unknown	February 26, 2019	0.246
The latest discoveries suggest that humans might be on the verge of discovering life beyond Earth. Scientists are investigating if Earth's life began elsewhere in the universe and whether the human race needs to evolve to know for sure.
61	9	"Finding the New Earth"	Unknown	March 5, 2019	0.264
New discoveries have revealed thousands of exoplanets beyond the Solar System. Some resemble Earth enough that one could be a new home for humanity. Even with cutting-edge technology, finding the perfect one is one of the scientific challenges of the age.
62	10	"Cassini's Final Secrets"	Unknown	March 12, 2019	0.303
For twenty years, NASA's Cassini spacecraft explored Saturn until it vaporized in Saturn's atmosphere. But its legacy lives on, as newly analyzed data from the probe helps scientists make additional discoveries.

=== Season 8 (2020) ===
No. overall	No. in series	Title	Directed by	Original release date	U.S. viewers (millions)
63	1	"Asteroid Apocalypse - The New Threat"	Unknown	January 2, 2020	0.290
If a massive asteroid collides with Earth, it could end life on the planet. New discoveries reveal how close Earth is to the apocalypse and what it would take for the world's leading space agencies to stop it.
64	2	"NASA's Journey to Mars"	Unknown	January 9, 2020	0.314
NASA is on a mission to send humans to Mars within 15 years. But to reach this next frontier of space exploration, experts must discover new technology and cutting-edge science that protects astronauts from the red planet's deadliest killers.
65	3	"Hunt for Alien Evidence"	Unknown	January 16, 2020	0.299
The discovery of extraterrestrial life might face an impossible challenge—the physics of the universe itself. With cutting-edge technology, experts might be on the verge of a groundbreaking find—and the evidence could already be in hand.
66	4	"Death of the Last Stars"	Unknown	January 23, 2020	0.315
The universe's stars are dying faster than new ones are born, and using the latest technology experts investigate the secrets of the last stars of the cosmos, and what this stellar apocalypse means for life on Earth.
67	5	"Secrets of Time Travel"	Unknown	January 30, 2020	0.276
Time travel might be more possible than humans have imagined, and cutting-edge technology and the latest research into black holes and wormholes is helping experts get steps closer to discovering how to travel through time.
68	6	"When NASA Met Jupiter"	Unknown	February 6, 2020	0.283
NASA's Juno spacecraft is exploring Jupiter. As this probe is pummeled with radiation, it gathers new data that could change everything known about the Solar System's biggest planet.
69	7	"Edge of the Universe"	Unknown	February 13, 2020	0.296
The edge of the universe and what happens there are unknown; but thanks to cutting-edge technology and new discoveries, experts might reveal the phenomena found in deepest reaches of the cosmos.
70	8	"Monsters of the Milky Way"	Unknown	February 20, 2020	0.281
The center of the Milky Way is home to phenomena that humans don't yet understand, but using the latest science experts are revealing how the supermassive black hole at the galaxy's core shapes life on Earth.
71	9	"Earth's Death Orbit"	Unknown	February 27, 2020	0.314
Earth's journey through the universe is a perilous one, and new discoveries reveal that the planet is heading toward a mysterious area of the cosmos that could eject us out of the Milky Way and into oblivion.

In the UK version of the series, there are two episodes of Season 8 that are not included in its US counterpart. These episodes are as follows:

No. overall	No. in series	Title	Directed by	Original release date	U.K. viewers (millions)
TBA	7	"How To Build A Planet"	Unknown	December 21, 2020	N/A
Some of the brightest minds and theorists on the planet explore the limits of human knowledge and explain the science behind the rules of the universe.
TBA	10	"Moon"	Unknown	January 11, 2021	N/A
New scientific discoveries reveal that the Moon has an incredible, violent, and dynamic history. Was the Moon originally more similar to Earth than previously thought?

=== Season 9 (2021) ===
No. overall	No. in series	Title	Directed by	Original release date	U.S. viewers (millions)
72	1	"Journey to a Black Hole"	Unknown	March 24, 2021	0.245
A two-hour episode examines what scientists have learned about M87*, the supermassive black hole in the supergiant elliptical galaxy Messier 87 (also known as Virgo A or NGC 4486). M87* is the first supermassive black hole photographed by the Event Horizon Telescope.
73	2	"Mission to a Comet"	Unknown	March 31, 2021	0.250
Experts embark on a mission to land on a comet. Rosetta is a space probe launched in 2004 that performed a detailed study of comet 67P/Churyumov–Gerasimenko (67P) using lander module Philae in 2014.
74	3	"Secrets of the Sun"	Unknown	April 7, 2021	0.203
NASA’s Parker Solar Probe investigates the Sun.
75	4	"Aliens of the Microcosmos"	Unknown	April 14, 2021	N/A
New discoveries reveal the power of microscopic alien organisms.
76	5	"Curse of the White Dwarf"	Unknown	April 21, 2021	0.224
Dead stars called white dwarfs may be the key to understanding the cosmos.
77	6	"War of the Galaxies"	Unknown	April 28, 2021	0.193
Discover how galaxies interact across the universe.
78	7	"The Next Supernova"	Unknown	May 5, 2021	0.174
Experts search for the star that may be the next supernova.
79	8	"Secret Lives of Neutrinos"	Unknown	May 12, 2021	N/A
New science reveals why neutrinos are the universe's strangest particles.
80	9	"Birth of Monster Black Holes"	Unknown	May 19, 2021	N/A
Scientists have discovered one of the first supermassive black holes.
81	10	"Gravitational Waves Revealed"	Unknown	May 26, 2021	N/A
Gravitational waves allow scientists to explore the universe in a new way.
82	11	"Mystery of Alien Worlds"	Unknown	June 2, 2021	N/A
New discoveries reveal mysterious alien worlds.

=== Season 10 (2022) ===
No. overall	No. in series	Title	Directed by	Original release date	U.S. viewers (millions)
83	1	"Secrets of the Cosmic Web"	Alex Hearle	March 6, 2022	0.233
New astronomical research is beginning to reveal an invisible scaffold of dark matter known as the Cosmic Web, an intergalactic network that transformed the universe from a chaotic Big Bang into the structured beauty of the present day cosmos.
84	2	"Curse of the Cosmic Rays"	Alex Hearle	March 13, 2022	0.275
Experts attempt to determine where cosmic rays originate in the universe.
85	3	"Hunt for Dark Matter"	Alex Hearle	March 21, 2022	0.253
Dark Matter is thought to be the cosmic glue that holds the universe together, yet the search for it continues to eluded scientists today.
86	4	"Dark History of Earth"	Unknown	March 28, 2022	N/A
Earth's history is marked by one cosmic disaster after another, forging the path of human evolution; now, experts explore how the Earth has teetered on the verge of destruction.
87	5	"Hunt for the Universe's Origin"	Unknown	April 3, 2022	0.232
Experts explore the elusive endeavor of determining the age of the cosmos.
88	6	"Voyager's Ultimate Mission"	Unknown	April 10, 2022	0.299
The two Voyager spacecraft have travelled farther than any human-made object in history, and as they reach interstellar space, experts explore their most astonishing discoveries and how their extended operation has transformed into the ultimate mission.

=== Season 11 (2023) ===
No. overall	No. in series	Title	Directed by	Original release date	U.S. viewers (millions)
89	1	"The Moons of Saturn"	Unknown	March 5, 2023	0.198
Discover how Saturn's moons could rewrite the rules of the Solar System.
90	2	"A Robot's Guide to Mars"	Unknown	March 12, 2023	0.153
Perseverance aims to uncover if there was ever life on the Red Planet.
91	3	"Most Violent Event in the Universe"	Unknown	March 19, 2023	0.161
Experts explore what happens when two supermassive black holes collide.
92	4	"Countdown to Catastrophe"	Unknown	March 26, 2023	0.198
Experts confront the potential catastrophe of a fictional asteroid event.
93	5	"Solar System Special"	Unknown	April 2, 2023	0.167
New discoveries have rewritten the complex history of the Solar System.

Note: In the UK version of this series, the aforementioned episodes are still part of its tenth season run. This information is backed up by a 10-episode production order for Season 10 as posted on the official Pioneer Productions site.

== See also ==
- Alien Planet
- Cosmos: A Spacetime Odyssey
- Extreme Universe
- Into the Universe with Stephen Hawking
- Killers of the Cosmos
- Mars: The Secret Science
- The Planets and Beyond
- Space's Deepest Secrets
- Strip the Cosmos
- Through the Wormhole
- The Universe
