= Strip the City =

2012 American documentary TV series

- Title card
- Genre: Documentary series
- Narrated by: Thom Kikot
- Country of origin: United States
- Original language: English
- No. of seasons: 2
- No. of episodes: 14

Production
- Executive producer: Carlo Massarella
- Producer: Ron Hartel
- Running time: 40–43 minutes
- Production company: Windfall Films

Original release
- Network: Science Channel
- Release: October 26, 2012 – March 26, 2014

Strip the City is a documentary science television series that aired on the Science Channel in 2012 and 2014. It explores the construction of major cities and the geology lying beneath them, with an emphasis on computer-generated imagery to "strip" away layers of structures and the rock of geological features to reveal their interiors.

== Content ==
Strip the City uses computer-generated imagery (CGI) to "strip" major cities layer-by-layer of their steel, concrete, buildings, roads, rivers. and bedrock to reveal the technology and infrastructure that allowed their creation and keeps them functioning. CGI also peels back the layers of buildings to show how they were constructed, strips away oceans to reveal sunken cities, and cuts into rock to display the inner workings of volcanoes, subterranean rivers, underground volcanoes and cliffs, fault lines, and ancient catacombs and describe their impact on life in the cities above them.

A later Science Channel series, Strip the Cosmos, built upon the CGI concepts introduced in Strip the City, employing them to reveal the interiors of astronomical objects.

== Episode list ==
=== Season 1 (2012) ===
No.	Title	Directed by	Original release date
1	"Ancient City: Rome"	Roeland Doust	October 26, 2012
Ancient Rome is the prototype of all modern cities, and 2,000 years ago it was the biggest city in the world, with a population of one million people. Roman engineers mastered the construction of buildings, roads, and viaducts and set the city on course to become the hub of the Roman Empire, the greatest Empire the world had ever seen. Known as the "Eternal City," Rome has survived better than any other ancient city on earth and now is home to three million people. The episode strips Rome's most famous landmarks bare to reveal how Roman engineers built the Pantheon, Colosseum, Trevi Fountain, and Appian Way; explores deep underground to reveal the crucial role volcanoes played in Rome's growth; descends into the tunnels that run under most of Rome; abseils into an ancient aqueduct; and reveals how the Rome Metro is being built. It also explores the volcanic geology that shaped Rome's past – providing the pozzolanic ash that is a key ingredient of Roman concrete and the lava that underpins Rome's roads – and challenges its future.
2	"Earthquake City: San Francisco"	Roeland Doust	November 2, 2012
San Francisco sits on the San Andreas Fault, one of the world's most infamous earthquake hotspots. The episode use CGI anmination to peel the glass off San Francisco's skyscrapers and the steel off its bridges and spotlight how San Francisco's buildings and infrastructure are designed to survive a destructive earthquake and are protected from the raging fires that could follow one. It also explores the geology that shaped San Francisco's past and challenges its future, including the valleys that hold the city's firefighting water and the fault line that is overdue for a massive earthquake.
3	"Desert City: Dubai"	Gwyn Williams	November 9, 2012
Dubai is a gleaming desert metropolis that grew in just a few decades even though it sits in one of the driest places on earth, is pummeled by sandstorms, and has skyscrapers that rest on sand. The episode uses CGI animation to peel the glass off Dubai's skyscrapers and reveal their design and construction and to strip away the desert sand to explore Dubai's origins; visits the city's leading engineers and geologists as they explain how Dubai's buildings remain standing, survive desert storms, and keep their occupants cool in the searing heat; and explores the geology that shaped the city's past and challenges its future, from the rich oil fields offshore to the desert dunes where sandstorms begin.
4	"Harbour City: Sydney"	Gwyn Williams	November 16, 2012
Sydney is home to a fifth of Australia's population and is still growing. It lies on the driest inhabited continent on Earth between the Blue Mountains and the Tasman Sea and is the world's most extreme harbor city, surrounding one of the planet’s largest natural harbors. The episode explores the engineering that makes Sydney's existence possible and the geological forces that sculpted the city. CGI animation peels back the glass off Sydney's skyscrapers and the stone off the iconic Sydney Opera House to reveal their design and construction; strips the water from Sydney Harbour to explore its origins; visits Sydney's leading engineers and geologists as they reveal what makes the city function, from the concealed contours of the harbor that allow large ship to reach the heart of Sydney to the caverns that store its water; and explores the geology that shaped Sydney's past and challenges its future, from the rich coal seams underneath it to the deep gorges that channel bush fires right into the heart of the city.
5	"Ice City: Toronto"	Oliver Twinch	November 23, 2012
The largest city in Canada, Toronto is a sprawling metropolis of towering skyscrapers on the shore of Lake Ontario that lies on land carved out by ancient glaciers. Each winter temperatures in Toronto plummet to −40 °F (−40 °C) and strong snowstorms strike the city. The episode explores how Toronto grew into a great city with CGI animation that peels the glass and concrete off its skyscrapers to reveal their design and construction and sucks the water up out of its lakes to explore their origins; visits Toronto's leading engineers and geologists as they explain what keeps the iconic CN Tower standing, how Toronto's buildings are protected from snowstorms, and how the buildings keep their occupants warm in the extreme cold of winter; and explores the city's geology, from the rich salt reserves that power Toronto's industry to the colossal waterfalls that generate power for its expansion.
6	"Underground City: London"	Roeland Doust	November 30, 2012
London is the world's most extreme "underground city." As its buildings soar higher, its tunnels go deeper, and London has more underground infrastructure than any other city in the world. This episode joins people working underground in London, from tunnel builders digging a new London Underground line 40 metres (131 ft) beneath the ground to workers scrubbing its sewer tunnels to prevent outbreaks of disease; lifts up Buckingham Palace to reveal a "lost" river beneath it; and showcases the innovative engineering behind the construction of London's new port, London Gateway. CGI animation peels away the structure of the Tower of London layer by layer to reveal the true scale of the River Thames, which once was a tidal torrent, and strips the steel and glass from Europe's tallest skyscraper — The Shard — to reveal its design. The episode also explores the geology that shaped the city's past and challenges its future, from the rich clay that it sits on to the river that may one day consume it.

=== Season 2 (2014) ===
No.	Title	Directed by	Original release date
1	"Superstorm City: New York"	Glenn Swift	January 29, 2014
New York City is an important port because it has one of the world's largest natural harbors, but that harbor also poses also poses the greatest danger New York faces, making the city vulnerable to deadly superstorms coming in from the Atlantic Ocean. Rising sea levels have added to this problem by threatening the New York City Subway and New York's utility tunnel network. In the episode, CGI animation peels the outer layers off Grand Central Station and the Verrazzano–Narrows Bridge to reveal their design and construction; visits leading engineers and geologists as they explain how One World Trade Center, deeply rooted in extremely strong bedrock, is designed to remain standing even in the most severe weather and how they have developed giant inflatable plugs to stop the next superstorm from flooding subway stations; and the geology that shaped the New York's past and challenges its future is revealed, from the schist bedrock it was constructed on to the way in which its harbor could one day lead it to disaster.
2	"Heatwave City: Chicago"	Will Aspinall	February 5, 2014
Chicago is a sprawling metropolis constructed on a flat plain carved out by ancient glaciers. The plain creates deadly heat waves, making Chicago the most extreme heat wave city in the United States. Summer temperatures can reach 110 °F (43 °C), placing great stress on Chicago's structures. The episode explains how Chicago's skyscrapers survive by exploring the city's giant central cooling system; examining Chicago's fleet of ultramodern fireboats; using CGI animation to strip the glass and concrete off the Willis Tower and peel back O'Hare International Airport's runways to reveal their design and construction; and visiting engineers and geologists as they explain how Chicago's skyscrapers are heatproofed and keep their occupants cool and how Chicago's bridges and railroad tracks are protected from melting.
3	"Sinking City: Venice"	Caroline Harvey	February 12, 2014
Venice lies on the Venetian Lagoon on the edge of the Adriatic Sea and is made up of 118 islands connected by over 400 bridges. More than 16 million visitors come to Venice each year. But sea levels are rising and Venice is gradually sinking, and parts of the city flood 250 times every year. The episode uses CGI animation to peel bricks and stone from Venice's historic buildings and drain its waterways to reveal their structure; visits engineers and geologists as they explain how the bell tower at Saint Mark's Basilica remains standing and measures taken to protect Venice from flooding; chronicles the work of a team of divers as they make the first underwater inspection of the 400-year-old Rialto Bridge; explores the design and construction of Venice's new flood barrier project, MOSE; and explores the geology that shaped Venice's past and challenges its future, from the soft ground that it sits on to the lagoon from which it grew.
4	"Megaquake City: Tokyo"	Johnny Shipley	February 19, 2014
Tokyo is an ultramodern metropolis built an area that faces some of the Earth's most destructive forces, including tsunamis from the east, an active volcano — Mount Fuji — to the west, and powerful earthquakes emanating from miles below. The episode uses CGI animation to peel the glass off Tokyo's skyscrapers and rolls up its roads to reveal their design and construction; visits with engineers and geologists as they explain the technology that keeps the skyscrapers standing, powers the city, and protects its residents from some of the deadliest earthquakes on Earth; and explores the geology that shaped Tokyo's past and challenges its future, from Mount Fuji to the west to the fault lines that threaten the city with the next giant earthquake and the tsunamis it would generate.
5	"Hurricane City: New Orleans"	Nathaniel Jessel	February 26, 2014
A vibrant city of culture and jazz, New Orleans stands along the banks of the Mississippi River and is completely surrounded by water. New Orleans lies on unstable, silty mud, is losing land fast to the Gulf of Mexico, and is in the path of one or more hurricanes almost every year. The episode uses CGI animation to strip apart a hurricane, lift the roof off the Superdome to see how it is designed to survive 1,000-mile-per-hour (1,600 km/h) winds, reveal how skyscrapers of New Orleans stop themselves from sinking, and lit up its bridges to see how they are constructed to survive even a severe storm; examines a plan to build the biggest network of pumping stations in the world to prevent New Orleans from flooding even in the largest hurricanes. It also explores the geology that shaped the city's past and challenges its future, from the silt into which the city is sinking to the flood barriers that will prevent the next hurricane from damaging New Orleans.
6	"Cavern City: Paris"	Matt Margrett	March 12, 2014
Paris is built above a network of tunnels and ancient quarries stretching for over 180 miles (290 km). The quarries provide construction materials for the city, but also threaten it with collapse. The episode uses CGI animation to strip away layers of the Eiffel Tower (exposing its foundation, which extends just 17 feet (5.2 m) below the surface), Notre-Dame de Paris, and Sacré-Cœur to show their design and construction; peels back the boulevards of Paris to reveal the threat that lies just 60 feet (18 m) below ground; descends into Paris's subterranean world to meet the engineers and geologists working to prop up the streets above and join the team constructing a new line for the Paris Métro; and visits the team building Paris's newest skyscraper to see how they are using the same "light touch" design in its construction as was used in building the Eiffel Tower's foundation. The episode also explores the geology that shaped Paris's past and challenges its future, from limestone rock it sits on to the Seine — the river that may one day consume it.
7	"Inca Empire: Machu Picchu"	Joe Myerscough	March 19, 2014
Perched on slopes of the Andes at an elevation of 11,000 feet (3,350 m), the ancient city of Machu Picchu was home to over a thousand people. The city was built as a royal retreat for the Sapa Inca — the emperor – of the Inca Empire, and it took a thousand stonemasons almost a hundred years to complete it. Although constantly under threat from earthquakes, landslides, and floods. Machu Picchu has survived for over 400 years. The episode uses CGI animation to strip Machu Picchu's temples, buildings, and terraces to reveal the techniques that allowed the Inca to build the city without modern tools in one of the most inhospitable regions on earth and the stonework that made Inca roads one of the most advanced highway systems in the ancient world. Engineers and archaeologists explain how the Inca earthquake-proofed the walls of the city's structures with precision-cut granite blocks and built a sophisticated canal system which supplied water to the city throughout the year. The episode also explores the geology that shaped Machu Picchu's past and challenges its future, from the steep granite slopes it is built on to the threat of deadly landslides.
8	"Earthquake City: Los Angeles"	Johnny Shipley	March 26, 2014
The entertainment capital of the world, Los Angeles stands on one of the world's most infamous earthquake hotspots, the San Andreas Fault, and exists under the constant threat of a catastrophic earthquake. The episode uses CGI animation to peel back the glass of its skyscrapers and the steel of its bridges to reveal their design and construction; visits surveyors and geologists as they explain how the design and construction of Los Angeles's skyscrapers, roads, and aqueducts will protect them and the population of the city when the next major earthquake strikes. It also explores the geology that shaped Los Angeles's past and challenges its future, from the oil reserves that attracted the first non-Native American settlers in the area to the fault line where a massive earthquake is long overdue.

== See also ==
- Strip the Cosmos
