= Strip the Cosmos =

2014 American documentary TV series

- Title card
- Genre: Documentary series
- Narrated by: Eric Loren
- Country of origin: United States
- Original language: English
- No. of seasons: 4
- No. of episodes: 30

Production
- Executive producers: Carlo Massarella (Seasons 1–4); Dan Kendall(Season 2); Rob Hartel (Season 3)
- Producers: Dan Kendall (Season 1); Gwyn Williams (Season 2); Mark Bridge (Season 3); Stuart Rose (Season 4)
- Running time: 40–43 minutes
- Production company: Windfall Films

Original release
- Network: Science Channel
- Release: November 12, 2014 – present

Strip the Cosmos is a documentary science television series narrated by Eric Loren. Aired by the Science Channel, it premiered on November 12, 2014.

== Content ==
Strip The Cosmos builds upon a concept introduced in an earlier show, Strip the City — in which layers of a city were "stripped" away with computer-generated imagery to reveal what lay beneath them — and applies it to the universe as a whole. The series "strips" away layers of objects such as stars, planets, moons, comets, and black holes to reveal their interiors layer by layer and create a better understanding of how they originated, what makes them up, and how they work, with commentary by experts in astronomy and astrophysics. The series also describes space missions intended to expand human understanding of the universe.

== Episode list ==
=== Season 1 (2014) ===
No.	Title	Directed by	Original release date
1	"Secrets of the Black Hole"	Duncan Bulling	November 12, 2014
There are millions of black holes — including one at the center of the Milky Way — each capable of swallowing a star the size of the Sun in seconds. However, they do not merely destroy: They also serve a vital function in galaxies as the anchors for planets and stars. CGI animation strips away a black hole's event horizon and explores what happens as matter falls into a black hole.
2	"Inside the Sun"	Glenn Swift	November 19, 2014
The Sun is a giant nuclear reactor which every second generates nine million times the annual energy consumption of the United States. Its surface rages with violent eruptions which eject huge plasma storms that hurl electromagnetic debris across the Solar System, and up to 20 of such storms threaten the Earth each day. Sunspots indicate that an eruption is brewing, and the episode shows how the United States Air Force monitors the Sun for eruptions and provides warning for astronauts in space and pilots of aircraft so that they can avoid blasts of solar radiation. CGI animation strips off the Sun's layers to reveal how it generates such an enormous amount of energy.
3	"Killer Asteroids"	Johnny Shipley	November 26, 2014
Asteroids threaten Earth constantly, and thousands of them pass close enough to Earth to pose a danger. The episode visits a team in Arizona that searches the sky for threatening asteroids, reveals how scientists test an intense laser beam they hope could one day deflect an approaching asteroid away from Earth, shows astronauts as they train in weightless conditions for the first crewed mission to an asteroid, and describes how asteroids could become refueling stations for spacecraft during missions into deep space.
4	"Expedition Mars"	Glenn Swift	December 3, 2014
Space agencies around the world are racing to launch the first human mission to Mars even though half of all missions sent to there end in failure and those which touch down safely must contend with dangers such as dust storms, dangerous radiation, and extremely cold temperatures. Although it is a cold and barren wasteland today, Mars was once similar to Earth. The episode visits ancient riverbeds, polar ice caps, and giant volcanoes on Mars to explain why Martian conditions changed, and CGI animations strip open Martian dust storms, lava tubes, and rock to find signs of life on Mars.
5	"Alien Worlds"	Matt Walters	December 10, 2014
Astronomers began to discover exoplanets in 1995 and now think almost every star has planets orbiting it, creating billions of different environments. Extremophiles live in the most challenging environments on Earth, and scientists believe that this means that life could exist in a wide variety of environments across the universe. The episode explores places in the universe that scientists believe might harbor life, using CGI animation to strip open frozen moons that are blasting water ice into space, reveal hidden oceans under their frozen surfaces, and unveil places where mountains are made of diamonds and volcanoes erupt with water.
6	"Hunting a Comet"	Matin Kemp	December 17, 2014
Comets are icy balls of dirt that may hold the key to all life on Earth. CGI animation strips open a comet to reveal its nucleus. The episode explores the idea that comets could have brought the water to Earth's oceans and could be the reason that humans exist at all, and also reveals the threat comets pose to life on Earth.

=== Season 2 (2017) ===
No.	Title	Directed by	Original release date
1	"Supermassive Black Holes"	Duncan Bulling	March 22, 2017
Supermassive black holes, formed when an extremely large mass collapses under the force of gravity into an infinitesimally small point, lie at the heart of every galaxy, including the Milky Way. The episode explores whether there might be a way to image the Milky Way's supermassive black hole, Sagittarius A*; visits scientists who study the extremely energetic jets supermassive black holes release, killing off star formation; chronicles the work of engineers who are building networks of telescopes to study supermassive black holes; and visits researchers investigating what happens inside a supermassive black hole, where time does not exist and the theory of relativity cannot explain the environment. CGI animation reveals how a black hole forms and what happens to any object venturing too close to its gravitational pull.
2	"Extreme Stars"	Duncan Bulling	March 29, 2017
Stars forge chemical elements inside their cores. The lives of stars hundreds of times larger than the Sun and burning over million times brighter than it end in cataclysmic supernova explosions that spread these elements throughout the universe, and thereby could be the key to understanding our own existence. The episode follows scientists investigating some of the earliest stars in the universe, which existed over 13 billion years ago; visits astronomers at Jodrell Bank Observatory in the United Kingdom who have proposed the theory that a supernova explosion can create a freakish zombie star that cannibalizes other stars; and joins astrophysicists working in laboratories hidden under the Gran Sasso d'Italia in Italy who are hoping to predict a supernova explosion.
3	"Hunt for the Big Bang"	Nathan Budd	April 5, 2017
The Big Bang began time and space, leading to our universe of today, which contains over a hundred billion galaxies, each containing a hundred billion stars or more. The episode follows astronomers and physicists as they build a new generation of telescopes, particle accelerators, and supercomputers that allow them to peer back farther in time toward the Big Bang to better understand the story of the universe — instruments such as the James Webb Space Telescope, being built to see the first galaxies, the Relativistic Heavy Ion Collider on Long Island, where particles are smashed together to recreate the universe that existed before the first atoms, and a telescope suspended beneath a balloon flying at the edge of Earth’s atmosphere which could reveal what happened in the very first moment of the universe.
4	"Jupiter: The Sun's Secret Twin"	Nathan Budd	April 12, 2017
Like the Sun, Jupiter is made up almost entirely of hydrogen, and some scientists now think it almost became a star and therefore is the Sun’s secret twin. Little is known about Jupiter, a planet of extremes twice the size of all the other planets in the Solar System combined. Now the National Aeronautics and Space Administration (NASA) has launched Juno, a billion-dollar space mission to explore Jupiter. The episode joins Juno scientists at NASA’s Jet Propulsion Laboratory to unlock the mystery of intense radiation belts around the planet and observes a dramatic experiment in New York with molten rock{ that reveals what could be supercharging the radiation. CGI animation rips open Jupiter's atmosphere to uncover cyclones that rage for centuries, pressures so extreme they crush hydrogen gas into metallic hydrogen, and the astonishing phenomenon of a rainstorm of solid diamonds, something that scientists in Wales think they can recreate on Earth.
5	"Mystery of the Hidden Universe"	James Franklin	April 19, 2017
The episode focuses on the scientific search for hidden aspects of the cosmos, including radio astronomers searching for intergalactic plasma; teams in the United Kingdom, Italy, and the United States hunting for dark matter and dark energy; the European Space Agency’s Euclid mission; a dark matter detector beneath the Gran Sasso d'Italia; the construction of a powerful new telescope at Kitt Peak National Observatory in Arizona; and the scientists at Green Bank Observatory in West Virginia who postulate that the universe just one part of a multiverse and are seeking to prove it.
6	"Solar System: Hunt for the Missing Planet"	James Franklin	April 26, 2017
Scientists think they have detected something huge in the far reaches of the Solar System and that it might be a giant ninth planet that orbits the Sun. The episode visits with astronomers hunting for this hypothetical planet, seeking to understand how such a massive planet could have ended up so far away from the Sun — far beyond where science predicts planets can form — as well as teams in the United Kingdom, Germany, and the United States who are studying the Solar System's past in an attempt to revolutionize humanity's understanding of the Solar System’s formation. A reassessment of Jupiter’s early history could reveal how Planet 9 was born. CGI animation explores the origins the Solar System, and dramatic experiments recreate the microgravity of space to reveal the earliest moments of the Solar System's formation.

=== Season 3 (2018) ===
No.	Title	Directed by	Original release date
1	"Mystery of the Alien Asteroid"	Ben Wilson	October 22, 2018
Scientists have spotted ʻOumuamua (Hawaiian for "Scout"), an asteroid-like object the size and shape of a skyscraper and the first interstellar object to enter the Solar System ever detected. Scientists must race to study it before it disappears back into interstellar space, trying to determine where it came from, whether it threatens Earth, and even whether or not it is an alien spacecraft exploring the Solar System.
2	"Hunt for the Missing Black Holes"	Tom Hewitson	October 29, 2018
Scientists have found it difficult to explain how the universe could collapse the mass of seven billion suns into a single point in space to form a supermassive black hole, but astronomers are seeing glimpses of an entirely new type of black hole, which they call "seed" black holes. Seed black holes could be the building blocks of supermassive black holes, and could hold the key to understanding the history of the Milky Way.
3	"The Moon's Dark Secret"	David Briggs	November 5, 2018
The more scientists study the Moon, the more mysterious it becomes. They are trying to understand why it is so big, why one side of it is so different from the other, and whether two moons once orbited the Earth. Their findings have revealed that the Moon's history of cataclysmic planetary collisions, volcanoes spewing lunar lava, and an act of celestial cannibalism.
4	"Inside Saturn's Rings"	Ingo Nyakairu	November 12, 2018
Saturn is 4.6 billion years old, but its rings may have formed as recently as the Earth's Mesozoic Period. Seeking answers as to why the rings formed so late in Saturn’s life and how much longer they might last, scientists have discovered that one of Saturn’s moons might be creating a new ring to replace the old and that Saturn may have a dark ring on a scale that dwarfs the other rings.
5	"Secret History of the Solar System"	Carolina Izquierdo	November 19, 2018
Ancient meteorites are time capsules from the birth of the Solar System, but the story they tell simply does not match traditional theories of how it formed. They suggest that the Solar System may have been born inside the shell of a giant dying star, that rocky planets once orbited where the Earth is today, and that the Sun was born with a long-lost twin.
6	"Inside Mega Space Storms"	Ben Wilson	November 26, 2018
Jupiter, Saturn, Uranus, and Neptune have gigantic storms on a scale that dwarfs anything on Earth, including hurricanes larger than entire planets that drive 600-kilometer-per-hour (370 mph) winds, and thunderstorms in the cloud tops powerful enough to lay waste to the Earth. Scientists are studying this ferocious weather to determine what causes it and what it reveals about the interior dynamics of the gas giants and ice giants.
7	"Secrets of the Alien Megastructure"	Ben Wilson	December 3, 2018
Astronomers have found a star — Tabby's Star — whose behavior is so strange that some have called it "the strangest star in the galaxy." Something massive is blocking its light, and one suggestion is that the obstruction is a Dyson sphere — a vast megastructure — constructed by an advanced alien civilization.
8	"Hunt for the Missing Moons"	David Briggs	December 10, 2018
Astronomers are competing to discover the first exomoon — the first moon outside the Solar System — but none of the thousands of exoplanets they have discovered so far appear to have any moons. Scientists nonetheless think exomoons must exist, including Earth-like moons with oceans and mountains that could be home to advanced extraterrestrial life. Perhaps exomoons are simply hard to find, or maybe the moon-rich Solar System is unique. Now, a new generation of advanced telescopes is searching for answers.
9	"Pluto's Strange Secrets Revealed"	Ingo Nyakairu	December 17, 2018
NASA′s New Horizons probe has found that Pluto — a tiny dwarf planet on the edge of the Solar System that astronomers thought would be cold, geologically dead and covered in impact craters — is a world of smooth plains, riverbeds, mountain ranges, and perhaps even cryovolcanoes. Scientists are trying to understand Pluto's surprising geology, including whether it has a hidden liquid ocean, whether its glaciers of frozen nitrogen have self-healing powers, and if its large moon, Charon, is a cosmic thief.
10	"Hunting the Holographic Universe"	Carolina Izquierdo	December 24, 2018
A group of physicists have reached the conclusion that the universe is a hologram in which human lives play out on a two-dimensional bubble that surrounds the cosmos. Scientists looking for evidence to support the theory use lasers to create holograms they can touch, search for clues in the physics of black holes, and build detectors to search for glitches in the fabric of space-time.

=== Season 4 (2020) ===
No.	Title	Directed by	Original release date
1	"Mission to Mars"	Tom Ranson	October 28, 2020
Could the fossilized remains of early life lie buried on Mars? NASA’s Perseverance rover is on a mission to a four- billion-year-old river delta on Mars to search for evidence that life once existed there. The episode reveals the technologies Perseverance uses to sniff out the signs of ancient life and showcases an experiment aboard Perseverance that is laying the groundwork for humans to one day live on Mars.
2	"Hunting White Holes"	Nathan Budd	October 28, 2020
The theory of relativity predicts that white holes — huge eruptions of energy that could appear without warning anywhere in the universe — exist, but no astronomer has ever seen one. The episode details the latest research on white holes, including ideas that unexplained gamma-ray bursts could point to their location, that they are the dying gasps of tiny black holes located in the oldest part of the universe, and that they may lie at one end of a portal to another space and time.
3	"Life and Death of the Milky Way"	Rob Elliott	November 4, 2020
The light from thousands of galaxies, including the Milky Way, is getting dimmer. The episode looks into the latest research and discoveries about how galaxies are born, live, and die, including the possibility that massive eruptions of gas from the center of galaxies reduce star formation, that strange alien stars in the Milky Way reveal how to increase star formation again, and that a huge collision billions of years in the future could rejuvenate the Milky Way.
4	"Jupiter: Secrets of the Solar System"	Rob MacAndrew	November 4, 2020
The episode describes the latest findings of the Juno mission to Jupiter, including how hidden energy deep inside the planet drives its never-ending superstorms, how an ocean of metallic hydrogen in Jupiter’s interior creates a third magnetic pole at Jupiter’s equator, how a collision with another planet billions of years ago could explain why the core of Jupiter is a fuzzy mixture of rock and gas, and how Jupiter could explain the origins of life on Earth.
5	"Secrets of the Asteroids"	Tom Ranson	November 11, 2020
NASA’s OSIRIS-REx mission has intercepted the asteroid 101955 Bennu and sampled its rock. The rock that it returns to Earth promises to help scientists predict if 101955 Bennu will hit the Earth someday, how ancient minerals inside 101955 Bennu′s rocks could pinpoint the origins of life on Earth by revealing how organic chemistry reached the Earth billions of years ago, and how humans could mine the resources inside asteroids to fuel future missions to the outer Solar System.
6	"Inside Space's Great Wall"	Nathan Budd	November 11, 2020
Located six billion light years from Earth, the BOSS Great Wall — a collection of thousands of galaxies packed into a distinctive flattened shape — is the largest structure ever seen in the universe. The episode examines how the search for a mysterious invisible particle could unlock how the universe builds such a massive structure, how a mysterious alien-like creature reveals the BOSS Great Wall’s place in an even larger network, and how dark energy will tear down the BOSS Great Wall billions of years from now.
7	"Mystery of the Dead Planets"	Unknown	November 18, 2020
Astronomers scour the cosmos to identify a planet that humans could live on in the future, but the more planets they find, the more they discover how deadly to planets the Milky Way is. The episode examines why the Milky Way destroys so many planets, including how super-small, cool stars fry the planets that orbit them, how the carbon-rich atmosphere of Venus explains why so many alien worlds could be burning hellholes, and how runaway "hot Jupiters" explain why astronomers find so few habitable rocky planets.
8	"Mystery of the Giant Ice Planets"	Rob MacAndrew	November 18, 2020
Voyager 2 remains the only space probe to visit the Solar System’s ice giants — Uranus and Neptune — but new experiments and next-generation telescopes finally are revealing what makes these planets so strange, including how an ancient collision knocked Uranus onto its side; how a special ice cocktail reveals what powers super-huge geysers on Neptune’s largest moon, Triton; and what hidden energy powers the fastest winds in the Solar System.

== See also ==
- Alien Planet
- Cosmos: A Spacetime Odyssey
- Extreme Universe
- How the Universe Works
- Into the Universe with Stephen Hawking
- Killers of the Cosmos
- Mars: The Secret Science
- The Planets and Beyond
- Space's Deepest Secrets
- Strip the City
- Through the Wormhole
- The Universe
