= AXN (disambiguation) =

AXN is a pay-television channel (and various local channels) owned by Sony Pictures Television.

AXN may also refer to:

- Alexandria Municipal Airport's IATA code
- Alexon Group's London Stock Exchange symbol
- AXN, an option package for the Chevrolet Silverado
