= Into the Universe with Stephen Hawking =

2010 science documentary mini-series

- DVD cover
- Starring: Stephen Hawking
- Narrated by: Stephen Hawking & Benedict Cumberbatch
- Composer: Sheridan Tongue
- Country of origin: United Kingdom
- No. of episodes: 3

Production
- Running time: Episode 1 & 2: 44 mins Episode 3: 88 mins
- Production company: Darlow Smithson Productions

Original release
- Network: Discovery Channel
- Release: 25 April – 2 May 2010
- Network: Discovery Channel
- Release: 9 May 2010 – 2010

Into the Universe with Stephen Hawking is a 2010 science documentary television mini-series written by British physicist Stephen Hawking. The series was created for Discovery Channel by Darlow Smithson Productions and features computer generated imagery of the universe created by Red Vision. The series premiered on 25 April 2010 in the United States and started on 9 May 2010 in the United Kingdom with a modified title, Stephen Hawking's Universe (not to be confused with the 1997 PBS series by the same name).

An original soundtrack was composed for the series by television and film composer Sheridan Tongue, combining symphonic orchestral recordings with electronic and sampled elements. The score was recorded and mixed in 5.1 surround sound for HD broadcast and DVD and Blu-ray release. The first episode, "Aliens" was uploaded on documentary video hosting service Vimeo 26 April 2010. Other episodes are available on same website. In addition, the episodes are also available on iTunes for purchase. However, the episodes are only available as TV shows.

Hawking appears on screen in linking scenes using his own synthesized voice, while the voice-over narration is provided, in character as Hawking, by actor Benedict Cumberbatch, who played the physicist in the 2004 BBC TV film Hawking.

== Episodes ==
Episode 1: Aliens
Episode 2: Time Travel
Episode 3: The Story of Everything (At least some portions of this episode were used for the premiere episode of Curiosity, entitled "Did God create the universe?".)

== See also ==
- Brave New World with Stephen Hawking
- How the Universe Works
- Killers of the Cosmos
- The Planets and Beyond
- Stephen Hawking's Universe
- Strip the Cosmos
- Through the Wormhole
- The Universe
