= Alexon Group =

British clothing retailer

Alexon Group plc
- Company type: Public
- Traded as: LSE: AXN
- Industry: Clothing
- Defunct: 2014
- Fate: Dropped
- Successor: Jacques Vert
- Headquarters: Luton, United Kingdom
- Number of locations: 990 outlets
- Area served: United Kingdom; Europe

Alexon Group plc was a clothing retailer, based in Luton, England. The company was listed on the London Stock Exchange (symbol AXN). It was a constituent of the FTSE Fledgling Index.

== Overview ==
The group owned eight brands, which are available in more than 990 outlets around the United Kingdom and Europe, as well as online. These brands served specific segments of the market, offering co ordinated fashion ranges to women who appreciate classical styling and quality. Ruth Henderson was CEO of Alexon, at the time the only woman to head a major public listed company in the UK.

== Brands ==
- Ann Harvey
- Alexon
- Dash
- Eastex
- Kaliko
- Minuet Petite
- Bay Trading Company
- Style Group – owners of Envy (sold 2008 to John Kinnaird)

== Ownership ==
Since 2012, Alexon has been owned by the Jacques Vert group, which was formed by the merger of Jacques Vert and Alexon. In 2014, the Alexon brand was dropped.
