= Planetary =

Planetary means relating to a planet or planets. It can also refer to:

== Science ==
- Planetary habitability, the measure of an astronomical body's potential to develop and sustain life
- Planetary nebula, a type of astronomical object

== People ==
- Planetary (rapper), one half of east coast rap group OuterSpace

== Arts, entertainment, and media ==
- Planetary (comics), a comic book series by Warren Ellis and John Cassaday
- "Planetary (Go!)", a 2011 song by rock band My Chemical Romance
- Planetary Radio, a public radio show about space exploration, produced by The Planetary Society

== Organizations ==
- The Planetary Society, the Earth's largest space interest group

== Technology ==
- Epicyclic gearing (planetary gearing), an automotive transmission technology
- Planetary scanner, type of image scanner for making scans of rare books with mounted camera taking photos

== See also ==
- Planet (disambiguation)
