= Bay Trading Company =

The Bay Trading Company, or simply Bay Trading, was a chain of clothing stores situated throughout the United Kingdom and Ireland. Bhupinder Bal, a serial Entrepreneur, managed Bay, growing it from a start-up, to a major fashion retailer, in under 15 years. At sale, to Alexon Group, Bay had an annual turnover circa £100,000,000, 135 retail outlets; it employed 1400+ full time and part-time staff. According to Mintel, at the time, Bay Trading had 2.3% Market share of the 19-35 ladies-wear market.

In 1999, Bay Trading Company was acquired by Alexon Group plc having previously been a privately owned company. The business was relocated to Luton.

At the beginning of 2009, Bay Trading had over 100+ High Street stores across the UK. In addition to these there were also over 100+ Bay Trading concessions, primarily within Mackays and Sunwin department stores. In 2009, Bay Trading began trading online. In April 2009, there were approximately 1000 employees in the UK and Ireland, including concessions.

On 24 April 2009 Bay Trading was placed into administration by the Alexon Group. Deloitte was appointed administrator of Bay Trading after credit insurers withdrew cover against the fashion retailer. Prior to administration, the brand had 268 stand alone stores and concessions, mainly based in Mackays and Sunwin department stores.

In May 2009, Rinku Group purchased 45 Bay Trading stores and 85 Bay Trading concessions out of administration for an undisclosed sum, however as of 2015 the business no longer operates.
