= Ruth Henderson =

UK's first female Chief Executive Officer

Ruth Henderson was the UK's first female Chief Executive Officer of a publicly quoted company.

== Career ==
In the 1980s, Henderson was product director of Alexon Group, reporting to CEO Lawrence Snyder, during the Group's most profitable period (£21.40M profit from £167M sales (1990))

When Alexon Group demerged, in 1991, Lawrence Snyder becoming the Chairman of the demerged Alexon Group. He appointed Henderson as CEO. Henderson was at that time "the [first] and only woman chief executive of any significant British quoted company".

Peter Ridsdale was promoted to run the operations while she concentrated upon the buying, she left the group later in 1992, when profits from the demerged Group fell from £11.3M in 1992 to a loss of £0.9M in 1993.

At that time the CEO role appeared a step too far for Henderson, with many in the City calling for Lawrence Snyder to step back into the CEO role. However John Osborn, a former Sears executive renowned for slashing costs at British Shoe Corporation, was to replace Henderson as CEO. (Note; the 1993 loss was later restated by Osborn to a £12M loss)

Henderson initially took a step back in her career and in later 1993 became managing director of Baird's branded clothing business, with brand such as Windsmoor, Planet, Precis Petite and Dannimac. When she joined, the division's profit were £0.5m, but by 2001 profits were 14m.

In 2001, she became the CEO of the Group. As stated in The Telegraph: "For the time being, at least, she is revelling in her new-found role. This is hardly surprising considering Henderson has been granted a rare second chance to succeed in a role in which she once failed miserably. A decade ago she became the only female chief executive of a British public company when she took the helm at Alexon, the women's fashion group. Two years later, after she had turned an £11.3m profit into a near £1m loss she was stripped of the title."
