= Eric Loren =

American actor

- Born: Boston, Massachusetts, U.S.
- Occupations: Actor and Author
- Years active: 1990-Present
- Children: 2
- Website: http://www.ericloren.com/

Eric Loren is an American film and television actor, and author.

He has appeared on many TV shows and films. His most notable film roles are as Deputy Ryan in The Fourth Kind, as well as appearing in small roles in Red Lights and Green Zone. He also had a voice role in The Garfield Movie.

Loren has also appeared on television. He has had small roles in Doctor Who and its spin-off shows. He has had larger roles in shows including Weirdsister College where he played Dr Andy Starfinder. He also was the narrator for American documentary series Strip the Cosmos for all of its episodes from 2014 to 2020.

He has also voiced characters in many video games, including Overkill's The Walking Dead and Star Wars Battlefront.

He is also an author and has written many books, which are science-fiction and dystopian based.

== Filmography ==
=== Film ===
Year	Title	Role	Notes
1990	Nightbreed	Ambush Cop	
1990	Memphis Belle	Cook	
1990	The Tragedy of Flight 106: The Inside Story	US Embassy Official	Television film documentary
1995	Hackers	News Technician	
1997	The Saint	Embassy Official	
1998	Saving Private Ryan	War Department Lieutenant	
2003	Never Say Never: The Swedish Bikini Team	Henry	Direct-to-video
2006	Living the Quake	J. T. Williams	Television film
2007	Until Dawn	Doctor Gaudio	
2009	The Fourth Kind	Deputy Ryan	
2010	Green Zone	CIA Tech	
2010	Mr. Nice	Miami Prosecutor	
2010	S.N.A.F.U.	The Soldier	Short film
2012	Red Lights	Policeman	
2013	Air Force One Is Down	Gerry	Television film
2016	A Quiet Passion	Reverend Wadsworth	
2022	Curtain Call	Michael	Short Film
2024	The Garfield Movie	Roadkill, Busboy (voice)	

=== Television ===
Year	Title	Role	Notes
1990	Medics	Iraj Iravani	6 episodes
1992	Unnatural Pursuits	Harmony Cast	Episode: "I'm the Author"
1996	Over Here	Sharman	
1999	Big Bad World	Scott	Episode: "Happy Nappy"
2001	Weirdsister College	Andy Starfinder	8 episodes
2003	Seven Wonders of the Industrial World	Reporter	Episode: "Brooklyn Bridge"
2004	If...	FBI Agent	
2005	Space Race	Castenholz	Episode: "Race to the Moon"
2006	Holby City	Troy Bury	Episode: "We Gave Her All Our Love"
2006	I Shouldn't Be Alive	Chris Dutty	Episode: "Crash in a Volcano"
2006	The Eagle	Agent Ridler	Episode: "Kodenavn: Ithaka - Del 24"
2007	Doctor Who	Mr. Diagoras, Hybrid Dalek Sec	2 episodes
2009	Psychoville	Albert De Salvo	Episode: "Joy"
2014	Houdini	John Wilkie	Episode: "Part 1"
2014–2020	Strip the Cosmos	Narrator	30 episodes"
2016	Doctors	Grady Roche	Episode: "Martians"
2020	Baghdad Central	Senior Doctor	Episode: "Episode #1.5"

=== Video games ===
Year	Title	Role	Notes
2003	Primal	Lewis	
2003	Tomb Raider: The Angel of Darkness	Kurtis Trent	
2008	Haze	Additional voices	
2010	Battlefield: Bad Company 2	Flynn, Fereday	
2010	Apache: Air Assault		
2011	Battlefield 3	Sgt. Steve Campo	
2013	DmC: Devil May Cry	Additional Voices	
2013	Crysis 3	Teammate #5	
2013	Company of Heroes 2	The Western Front Armies DLC, Ardennes Assault DLC	
2013	Battlefield 4	USMC (Multiplayer)	
2013	Killzone: Shadow Fall	VSA	
2015	Star Wars Battlefront		
2016	Homefront: The Revolution		
2016	Tom Clancy's The Division	Rick Valassi	
2016	Homefront: The Revolution		
2017	Horizon: Zero Dawn	Travis Tate	
2017	Lego Marvel Super Heroes 2		
2017	Xenoblade Chronicles 2	Additional voices	
2018	State of Mind	Steve	
2018	Overkill's The Walking Dead	The Family, Heavy	
2020	Falcon Dash	Sufian	Voice and motion capture
2022	Horizon Forbidden West	Travis Tate	
2022	Lego Star Wars: The Skywalker Saga		
2023	Atomic Heart		English Version
2023	Dead Island 2	Jimmy Montana & Joshua	
2023	Payday 3	John Concord	
2023	Cyberpunk 2077: Phantom Liberty		
2025	Tomb Raider IV–VI Remastered	Kurtis Trent	

== Personal life ==
His parents are German immigrants, so he can speak German fluently, but with an American accent.

He has a degree in History and Religious Studies.

Loren lives in California with his wife Amy. He has two sons.
