= Windfall Films =

British television production company

- Founded: 1987; 38 years ago
- Founders: David Dugan; Oliver Morse; Ian Duncan
- Headquarters: London, England
- Parent: Argonon (2014–present)
- Website: windfallfilms.com

Windfall Films is a London-based British television production company that specializes in documentaries and factual programs covering science, engineering, history and natural history.

In February 2014, Windfall Films had been acquired by London-based international production group Argonon.

On 11 September 2018 ahead of MIPCOM 2018, Windfall Films signed a multi-series acquisition deal with Canadian production and distribution company Cineflix via the latter's British distribution unit Cineflix Rights to handle distribution rights to Windfall Films' factual production series including Strip the Cosmos.

On 15 January 2019, Windfall Films had reorganised its senior management team.

== Productions ==
=== Television series ===
Title	Years	Network	Notes
Horizon	1964–present	BBC Two	Took over production from BBC Studios co-production with BBC Studios Science Unit and Wingspan Productions
The Tourist Trap	1998	Channel 4	
Big, Bigger, Biggest	2008	Five	
Strip the Cosmos	2014–present	Science Channel	
My Floating Home	2016–2023	More4; HGTV Canada (Canada); Fyi (United States)	co-production with Remedy Canada and Cascade Productions
Unearthed	2016–present	Science Channel	
The Story of AI	TBA	Channel 4	co-production with 72 Films
