= Stephen Hawking's Universe =

1997 American astronomical documentary

- Country of origin: United states
- Original language: English
- No. of episodes: 6

Original release
- Network: PBS
- Release: 1997 – 1997

Stephen Hawking's Universe is an astronomical documentary from 1997 made for the PBS featuring the theoretical physicist Stephen Hawking. The six-episode series discusses the history of astronomy as well as black holes and dark matter.

== Brief ==
1. Seeing is Believing
2. The Big Bang
3. Cosmic Alchemy
4. On the Dark Side
5. Black Holes and Beyond
6. An Answer to Everything

An extensive online companion site was produced to accompany the documentary. The online companion covers history of cosmology, unanswered questions and other topics related to the program. It was designed to function as both a supplement to the series and a stand-alone web piece. Along with details explaining terminology, different models of the universe, biographies of famous historical figures in cosmology and content derived from the program, the web companion included discussions by contemporary cosmologists of "unsolved mysteries", an opportunity to ask questions, as well as suggestions for experiments.

== Reception ==
The series was panned by critics. A review in The Age called the series "dull educational programming" that was "simply boring" and "visually weak", noting that Hawking's involvement was "mainly used here for name value". Jim Dawson wrote in Minneapolis's Star Tribune that reading Hawking's book was better than watching the PBS TV series, because "The book is less infuriating...The series seems afraid it might scare you with too much science."

== See also ==
- Into The Universe with Stephen Hawking, a 2010 documentary mini-series
- Stephen Hawking's Universe, a book written by John Boslough, published in June 1989, "an introduction to the most remarkable scientist of our time".
- Stephen Hawking's Universe: The Cosmos Explained, a paperback book written by David Filkin, published in October 1998, "presents the frontiers of scientific knowledge about the basis of our existence & of everything around us".
