= Jacques Vert =

British fashion house and retailer

Jacques Vert Group
- Industry: Womenswear concession retailer
- Founded: 1972 by Jack Cynamon and Alan Green
- Headquarters: London, United Kingdom
- Key people: Peter Ridler - Chief Executive Officer
- Products: Women's clothing and accessories
- Owner: Calvetron Brands
- Number of employees: 4,000
- Website: Jacques Vert

Jacques Vert Group is a British fashion house and womenswear concession retailer. It is a subsidiary of Calvetron Brands, which owns over 470 outlets in the UK, Europe and Canada and incorporates such brands as Windsmoor, Precis, Kaliko, Planet, Eastex and Dash.

== History ==
The company was founded in 1972 by Jack Cynamon and Alan Green, two tailors from the East End of London. In 1977 they created a range of coordinated fashion, combined their names and added a French twist, creating the Jacques Vert brand and public company. The company expanded into a multi-branded fashion-retailing group in December 2002 with the acquisition of William Baird PLC which added three further womenswear labels – Planet, Precis Petite and Windsmoor. In 2010 the company launched a multi-brand outlet website: Just Last Season.

Jacques Vert (trading since 1972) and Irisa group (trading as Alexon since 1929) merged to become the Jacques Vert Group Ltd in 2012. Teresa Tideman took on the role of chief executive officer after working for Disney - upset a lot of people then left from March 2013 until March 2015. Tim Davies joined the Jacques Vert Group as CEO in April 2015. In April 2016, CFO Shaun Willis took over as CEO. In June 2016 the company also changed its name to Style Group Brands. In June 2017 Style Group Brands went into administration and was sold to Calvetron Brands. In its present form the company actively trades with the brands Jacques Vert, Précis, Dash and Eastex. Windsmoor, Planet and Kaliko are no longer actively sold, but are currently on hiatus. The company attempted to revive Windsmoor with a coats only collection in 2016–2017.

The company was listed on the Alternative Investment Market of the London Stock Exchange until 2010, when it was acquired by Sun Capital Partners. The Head Office is based in Shoreditch, London. Support operations, including warehousing, are located in Bowburn and Seaham in the north east of England.

The company operates internationally in Canada, UAE and Ireland. Prior to the 2017 administration, the company also traded in Belgium. Trading in over 470 stores. In the UK, stores that carry the brands include Debenhams, John Lewis, House of Fraser, and Independent Department Stores (AIS), as well as some standalone brand stores. In Canada, the company mainly retails at Hudson's Bay.

On 3 May 2018 it was stated that 1000 jobs could be at risk in the Jacques Vert chain as Calvetron Brands Limited prepare to call in administrators in the UK.

In August 2018, Edinburgh Woollen Mill announced that they would acquire all of Calvetron Brands' assets. In 2020, due to the COVID-19 pandemic, Edinburgh Woollen Mill itself went into administration, marking Calvetron Brands' third time in administration in three years.
