= Space's Deepest Secrets =

2016 American documentary TV series

- Title card
- Genre: Documentary series
- Narrated by: David O'Brien
- Country of origin: United States
- Original language: English
- No. of seasons: 8
- No. of episodes: 93

Production
- Running time: 40–43 minutes
- Production company: Red Marble Media

Original release
- Network: Science Channel
- Release: April 26, 2016 – present

Space's Deepest Secrets is a documentary science television series narrated by David O'Brien. Aired by the Science Channel, it premiered on April 26, 2016.

According to the Science Channel, "Space's Deepest Secrets shares the stories of the men and women who pushed their ingenuity and curiosity beyond the limits to uncover some of the most groundbreaking findings in the history of space exploration."

== Episode list ==
=== Season 1 (2016) ===
No.	Title	Directed by	Original release date
1	"The Universe's Greatest Hits"	Joel Pincosy	April 26, 2016
From the mission that saw Pluto for the first time to the Mars rovers, a new breed of explorers are risking their careers, and even their lives, to lead humanity to worlds we have never seen and tackle the mysteries of life itself.
2	"Hunt For Dark Energy"	Mark Radice	May 3, 2016
Meet the scientists across the world on the hunt for dark energy, an unknown form of energy which is hypothesized to permeate all of space and may be accelerating the expansion of the universe.
3	"Death of the Solar System"	George Harris	May 10, 2016
An exploration of the dramatic fate of our future descendants, the technology they will need to survive the end of this world billions of years from now, and our options for colonizing a new planet somewhere far from Earth.
4	"Alien Oceans"	David Stewart	May 17, 2016
A soaring quest through the Solar System's exotic and hidden water realms, from the deep seas below the icy crust of Europa to the vast prehistoric oceans that once existed on Mars billions of years ago.
5	"Secret History of the Voyager Mission"	Christopher Riley	May 24, 2016
Thirty-five years after leaving Earth, the Voyager spacecraft is going to leave the Solar System. The incredible story of a mission that was only supposed to last five years but is still going today.
6	"The Plot Against Gravity"	Nic Young	May 31, 2016
The story of how a large aerospace company, BAE Systems, began a secret project to counter the force of gravity while NASA simultaneously ran a similar Breakthrough Propulsion Physics Program.
7	"Attack of the Space Junk"	David Stewart	June 7, 2016
The future of space travel is under attack – by millions of pieces of debris from old satellites and missions that surround Earth. Go inside the effort by the United States Government and others to combat the lethal threat of space junk.
8	"Quest for the First Star"	Toby Macdonald	June 14, 2016
A team of scientists are looking for the very first stars in the universe, which were born moments after the Big Bang and gave creation the earliest ingredients for life. Go inside this groundbreaking quest for this pivotal moment.
9	"When the Sun Attacks"	Ben Fox	June 21, 2016
When the Sun flares up, billions of tons of superheated gas and intense radiation are propelled toward Earth. Experts are trying to predict what is coming toward the Earth and how to prepare for this threat.
10	"Inside NASA's Mission to Mars"	Alex Hearle	June 28, 2016
An in-depth look at how NASA is preparing for its most ambitious and dangerous mission yet: To land a human being on the surface of Mars.
11	"Secret History of the Solar System"	Toby Macdonald	August 6, 2016
The discovery of exoplanets pushes scientists to reexamine the origin of the Solar System. The evidence infers a tale of unrestrained collisions and chaos.
12	"The Truth Behind Parallel Universes"	Unknown	August 13, 2016
Scientists are working to determine if parallel universes exist.
13	"Dark Secret of the Universe"	David Stewart	August 20, 2016
Scientists are on the hunt to finally crack the dark secrets of the atoms that make up the universe.
14	"Inside a Monster Black Hole"	David Stewart	August 27, 2016
Inside the supermassive black hole that sits in the middle of our galaxy.

=== Season 2 (2017) ===
No.	Title	Directed by	Original release date
1	"NASA's Greatest Moments"	Unknown	April 11, 2017
The show counts down the greatest moments in NASA's nearly 60-year history, revealing the incredible stories behind the missions and discoveries that have remade our understanding of the Final Frontier.
2	"Strangest Alien Storms"	Unknown	April 18, 2017
New discoveries on alien planets reveal the most violent storms and strangest weather in the universe. On some planets, there might be rain of rubies and diamonds, and others could have supersonic winds and extreme temperatures.
3	"Black Holes: The Einstein Prophecy"	Duncan Bulling	April 25, 2017
Researchers investigate the dark secrets of the mysterious phenomena known as black holes.
4	"Secret History of Jupiter"	Nathan Budd	May 2, 2017
NASA's Juno mission reveals secrets about Jupiter, a strange world that is more like a star than a planet. Learning what lies beneath the planet's violent storms provides scientists with a new understanding of the Solar System.
5	"Mysteries of Alien Volcanoes"	James Franklin	May 9, 2017
New research into the Solar System's alien volcanoes reveal shocking discoveries. Many of these fiery wonders are similar to the volcanoes on Earth, and some might even have created the conditions for extraterrestrial life.
6	"Curse of Dark Matter"	Unknown	May 16, 2017
Recent discoveries have revealed vast clouds of dark matter in the universe This mysterious matter could be proof that multiple universes exist. Researchers investigate the secrets of dark matter.
7	"Race to Planet 9"	James Franklin	May 23, 2017
Scientists believe that there is an undiscovered massive planet lurking at the edge of the Solar System. Join researchers as they hunt for this mysterious world, an investigation that could reveal the secret history of the Solar System's formation.
8	"Rise of the Monster Stars"	Duncan Bulling	May 30, 2017
The most extreme stars in our universe could be the key to understanding life in the cosmos. These monster stars are among the oldest in the universe, and can be hundreds of times larger than the Sun and burn over million times brighter.
9	"Stranger Signals From Alien Worlds"	Unknown	June 6, 2017
For decades, researchers have been scouring the universe for signals from extraterrestrials. New discoveries reveal mysterious fast radio bursts from space that may be the key to confirming life in the cosmos.
10	"Secret History of the Big Bang"	Nathan Budd	June 13, 2017
Scientists are in a race to find the beginning of time and space, the Big Bang. Cutting-edge technology helps astronomers look back in time to uncover the mysteries of the universe's creation, revealing the first moments of the cosmos.

=== Season 3 (2017) ===
No.	Title	Directed by	Original release date
1	"Hunt for the Hidden Cosmos"	Ben Lawrie	August 22, 2017
New telescope technology has helped astronomers to explore the never-before-seen invisible universe. These modern marvels ushered in a new age of discovery, revealing secrets of space, from giant black holes to supernovas.
2	"When Meteors Attack"	Ivo Filatsch	August 29, 2017
Meteors are a deadly threat for our planet, but new technology may provide a way for Earth to fight back when they attack. Join experts as they uncover the mysteries behind these fascinating and terrifying celestial objects.
3	"Inside the New Space Race"	Abbey Jack Neidik	September 5, 2017
Space entrepreneurs are on a race to transform space travel and create a home for humans beyond Earth. In this 21st century Space Race, meet visionaries as they plan regular rocket launches, space hotels, and colonies on Mars.
4	"Search For Alien Earths"	Ruth Chao	September 12, 2017
Astronomers are on the hunt for the groundbreaking discovery that confirms extraterrestrial life. Using state-of-the-art technology like the Kepler space telescope, scientists examine thousands of exoplanets in search of another Earth.
5	"Cassini′s Grand Finale"	Unknown	September 19, 2017
Go inside the final moments of NASA's Cassini 20-year mission, which explored Saturn and its moons. Cassini revealed the secrets of strange new worlds that could harbor life, changing what we know about the Solar System.
6	"The Sun's Greatest Mysteries"	Matt Barrett	September 26, 2017
The latest discoveries reveal the mysterious and ever-changing nature of the Sun. Astronomers are only now beginning to understand the vast power of our giant star, and new ground-breaking investigations show it like never before.
7	"Expedition Extraterrestrial"	Ruth Chao	October 3, 2017
Scientists on the hunt for extraterrestrial life suspect that it might exist in the Solar System. Using the latest discoveries, experts might at last confirm that our neighbors might harbor alien life.
8	"When Black Holes Collide"	David Briggs	October 10, 2017
Three scientists won the Nobel Prize for their groundbreaking discovery of gravitational waves. These mysterious ripples in space and time were theorized by Albert Einstein and might reveal the secrets behind the birth of the universe.
Special	"Journey to Alien Worlds"	Unknown	October 16, 2017
New discoveries have experts on the hunt for extraterrestrial life in the Solar System and elsewhere in the cosmos. This special consists entirely of segments previously aired as part of the Space's Deepest Secrets episodes "Expedition Extraterrestrial" (Season 3, Episode 7) and "Search for Alien Earths" (Season 3, Episode 4).
Special	"Stars from Hell"	Unknown	October 23, 2017
New discoveries reveal the secrets of the most extreme stars in the universe. This special consists entirely of segments previously aired as part of the Space's Deepest Secrets episode "Rise of the Monster Stars" (Season 2, Episode 8) and the How the Universe Works episode "Stars That Kill" (Season 5, Episode 4).
Special	"Curse of the Black Holes"	Unknown	October 30, 2017
New discoveries uncover the mysterious nature of black holes. This special consists entirely of segments previously aired as part of the Space's Deepest Secrets episode "Black Holes: The Einstein Prophecy" (Season 2, Episode 3) and the How the Universe Works episode "Black Holes: The Secret Origin" (Season 5, Episode 2).
Special	"Riddles of the Sun"	Unknown	November 6, 2017
New discoveries reveal the secrets of the Sun. This special consists entirely of segments previously aired as part of the Space's Deepest Secrets episode "The Sun's Greatest Mysteries" (Season 3, Episode 6) and the Strip the Cosmos episode "Hunting a Comet" (Season 1, Episode 6).
Special	"NASA's Legendary Missions"	Unknown	November 13, 2017
Go inside the untold stories of some of NASA's greatest and most legendary missions. This special consists entirely of segments previously aired as part of the Space's Deepest Secrets episodes "Cassini′s Grand Finale" (Season 3, Episode 5) and "Secret History of the Voyager Mission" (Season 1, Episode 5).
Special	"Mars's Greatest Mysteries"	Unknown	November 20, 2017
As modern-day explorers race to send humans to Mars, the latest discoveries uncover the dangerous secrets of the Red Planet. This special consists entirely of segments previously aired as part of the Mars: The Secret Science episode "Race to the Red Planet" (Season 1, Episode 1) and the How the Universe Works episode "Life and Death on the Red Planet" (Season 5, Episode 6).
Special	"Search for Alien Life"	Unknown	November 27, 2017
New discoveries uncover possible evidence of alien life. This special consists entirely of segments previously aired as part of the Space's Deepest Secrets episode "Stranger Signals from Alien Worlds" (Season 2, Episode 9) and the Strip the Cosmos episode "Alien Worlds" (Season 1, Episode 5).
Special	"When Space Attacks"	Unknown	December 4, 2017
New discoveries reveal the secret dangers lurking in the cosmos. This special consists entirely of segments previously aired as part of the Space's Deepest Secrets episode "When Meteors Attack" (Season 3, Episode 2) and the How the Universe Works episode "The Universe's Deadliest" (Season 5, Episode 5).
Special	"Mysteries of the Big Bang"	Unknown	December 11, 2017
New discoveries uncover the true story of the universe's creation. This special consists entirely of segments previously aired as part of the Space's Deepest Secrets episodes "Secret History of the Big Bang" (Season 2, Episode 10) and "Quest for the First Star" (Season 1, Episode 8).
Special	"Secret History of Dark Matter"	Unknown	December 18, 2017
New discoveries shed new light on dark matter, one of the universe's biggest mysteries. This special consists entirely of segments previously aired as part of the Space's Deepest Secrets episode "Curse of Dark Matter" (Season 2, Episode 6) and the How the Universe Works episode "The Dark Matter Enigma" (Season 5, Episode 7).

=== Season 4 (2018) ===
No.	Title	Directed by	Original release date
Special	"Curse of the Hell Stars"	Unknown	May 7, 2018
The latest discoveries reveal the dark secrets of the deadliest stars of the cosmos. This special consists entirely of segments previously aired as part of the Space's Deepest Secrets episode "Rise of the Monster Stars" (Season 2, Episode 8) and the How the Universe Works episode "Stars That Kill" (Season 5, Episode 4).
Special	"Big Bang: The Dark Secrets"	Unknown	May 14, 2018
The latest discoveries reveal the dark secrets behind the Big Bang, the mysterious moment when the universe was born. This special is a duplicate of the Season 3 Space's Deepest Secrets special "Mysteries of the Big Bang," which itself consists entirely of segments previously aired as part of the Space's Deepest Secrets episodes "Secret History of the Big Bang" (Season 2, Episode 10) and "Quest for the First Star" (Season 1, Episode 8).
1	"The Time Travel Enigma"	Unknown	May 15, 2018
Time travel is less impossible than we think, and the newest discoveries in space and theoretical physics have us on the brink of cracking one of the universe's greatest puzzles.
Special	"Secrets of Alien Universes"	Unknown	May 21, 2018
An investigation into whether parallel universes exist and the possibility of traveling through time and space to reach them. This special consists entirely of segments previously aired as part of the Space's Deepest Secrets episodes "The Time Travel Enigma" (Season 4, Episode 1) and "The Truth Behind Parallel Universes" (Season 1, Episode 12).
2	"Mission To The Red Planet"	Unknown	May 22, 2018
The latest science reveals what it would take to build colonies on Mars and how our future on the Red Planet might be closer than we think.
3	"Hunt for the Edge of the Universe"	Unknown	May 29, 2018
New discoveries are helping experts map the entire universe, and they are finding strange truths about the cosmos and its unimaginable size.
Special	"Rise of the Red Planet"	Unknown	June 4, 2018
New discoveries reveal that Mars was once home to alien life, and today, modern-day explorers are trying to transform this desert world into a new Earth-like planet for humans. This special consists entirely of segments previously aired as part of the Space's Deepest Secrets episode "Mission to the Red Planet" (Season 4, Episode 2) and the How the Universe Works episode "Life and Death on the Red Planet" (Season 5, Episode 6).
4	"Journey to Alien Earths"	Unknown	June 5, 2018
New discoveries of alien earths reveal vital clues in finding extraterrestrial life. Using the latest science and technology, experts reveal the strange landscapes and oceans of these distant worlds.
Special	"The Universe's Most Unknown"	Unknown	June 11, 2018
New discoveries reveal the secrets of the universe's most unknown and mysterious places. This special consists entirely of segments previously aired as part of the Space's Deepest Secrets episodes "Hunt for the Edge of the Universe" (Season 4, Episode 3) and "Hunt for the Hidden Cosmos" (Season 3, Episode 1).
5	"Wrath of the Black Hole"	Unknown	June 12, 2018
New discoveries change everything known about black holes, and using the latest science and technology, experts reveal secrets of the mysteries behind these strange and deadly places.
Special	"Hunt for Alien Worlds"	Unknown	June 18, 2018
New discoveries uncover the secrets of the universe's strange alien worlds that could be home to extraterrestrial life. This special consists entirely of segments previously aired as part of the Space's Deepest Secrets episode "Journey to Alien Earths" (Season 4, Episode 4) and the How the Universe Works episode "Strangest Alien Worlds" (Season 5, Episode 8).
6	"New Race to the Moon"	Unknown	June 19, 2018
New discoveries reveal that the Moon could be the next home for human life, triggering a new international space race to make it the home of humanity's first space colony.
Special	"Black Holes of Doom"	Unknown	June 25, 2018
New discoveries reveal the secrets of black holes, the universe's most dangerous and mysterious phenomena. This special consists entirely of segments previously aired as part of the Space's Deepest Secrets episodes "Wrath of the Black Hole" (Season 4, Episode 5) and "Black Holes: The Einstein Prophecy" (Season 2, Episode 3).
7	"Mars: The Next Frontier"	Unknown	June 26, 2018
Modern-day explorers are competing in a new space race to send the first people to Mars, and cutting-edge technology might make the Red Planet the next home for human life.
Special	"Mysteries on the Moon"	Unknown	July 2, 2018
The latest science sheds new light on the Moon, a world of mysterious phenomena and a possible new home for humanity. This special consists entirely of segments previously aired as part of the Space's Deepest Secrets episode "New Race to the Moon" (Season 4, Episode 6) and the How the Universe Works episode "Secret History of the Moon" (Season 4, Episode 6).
Special	"Mars' Darkest Secrets"	Unknown	July 9, 2018
New discoveries reveal the mysteries and dangers on Mars, and if the planet is ready to support a human civilization. This special consists entirely of segments previously aired as part of the Space's Deepest Secrets episodes "Mission to the Red Planet"" (Season 4, Episode 2) and "Mars: The Next Frontier" (Season 4, Episode 7) and the Strip the Cosmos episode "Expedition Mars" (Season 1, Episode 4).
8	"Secret History of the Juno Mission"	Unknown	July 10, 2018
NASA's Juno mission is the closest humans have explored Jupiter, and its incredible images reveal the gas giant's deepest secrets and how this deadly world helped create the Solar System.
Special	"Curse of Jupiter"	Unknown	July 16, 2018
New discoveries from NASA's expedition to Jupiter have changed everything we thought we knew about this strange and deadly world. This special consists entirely of segments previously aired as part of the Space's Deepest Secrets episodes "Secret History of the Juno Mission" (Season 4, Episode 8) and "Secret History of Jupiter" (Season 2, Episode 4).
9	"Mystery of the Northern Lights"	Tom Ranson	July 17, 2018
The aurora borealis is one of Earth's most incredible sights, and new discoveries finally explain why these mysterious lights appear and what they reveal about the Sun's sinister and deadly powers.
Special	"Mysteries of the Sun"	Unknown	July 23, 2018
New discoveries reveal the dark power of the Sun and how its strange behavior affects life on Earth.
Special	"Asteroids of Doom"	Unknown	July 30, 2018
New discoveries reveal the dangers that asteroids pose to planet Earth, but also that these rocky worlds could be the next destination for human space colonization.
Special	"NASA's Greatest Discoveries"	Unknown	October 13, 2018
NASA's Voyager, Cassini, and Juno missions are groundbreaking scientific feats that changed everything we know about our universe, and testimony from the modern-day explorers behind these expeditions reveal the incredible secrets they discovered. This special consists entirely of segments previously aired as part of the Space's Deepest Secrets episodes "Secret History of the Voyager Mission" (Season 1, Episode 5), "Cassini′s Grand Finale" (Season 3, Episode 5) and "Secret History of the Juno Mission" (Season 4, Episode 8).
10	"Pluto's Strange Secrets"	Unknown	October 14, 2018
NASA's mission to Pluto gathered the first close-up pictures of this strange and distant world, and now new discoveries and the latest science reveal the secrets of its alien features, which could point to extraterrestrial life.

=== Season 5 (2018) ===
No.	Title	Directed by	Original release date
1	"Dark Origins of the Moon"	Unknown	October 15, 2018
New discoveries reveal that things humans know about the Moon could be wrong, and now investigators are working to understand the mysteries of its dark and violent past.
Special	"Mysteries on Alien Earths"	Unknown	October 15, 2018
Experts are discovering new Earth-like planets all over our universe, and using the latest science, they investigate the secrets of these strange worlds that could be homes for extraterrestrial life. This special consists entirely of segments previously aired as part of the Space's Deepest Secrets episodes "Search for Alien Earths" (Season 3, Episode 4) and "Journey to Alien Earths" (Season 4, Episode 4).
2	"Mystery of the Alien Megastructure"	Tom Hewitson	October 22, 2018
A mysterious star hundreds of light years away might hold the hard evidence of extraterrestrial life, as experts speculate that its bizarre behavior points to proof of a massive alien-made megastructure.
Special	"Strangest Alien Stars"	Unknown	October 22, 2018
New technology helps experts make startling discoveries about the origins of the universe's stars, revealing the secrets of how they transformed the cosmos. This special consists entirely of segments previously aired as part of the How the Universe Works episode "Extreme Stars" (Season 1, Episode 4) and the Space's Deepest Secrets episode "Quest for the First Star" (Season 1, Episode 8).
3	"Journey to Saturn's Rings"	Ingo Nyakairu	October 29, 2018
New discoveries are changing what humans know about Saturn's rings, revealing that they are newer and more mysterious than most imagined, and that some day soon they might disappear forever.
Special	"NASA's Mission to Jupiter"	Unknown	October 29, 2018
Cutting-edge technology developed at NASA reveals the hidden secrets and strange phenomena on the Solar System's biggest planet, Jupiter.

=== Season 6 (2019) ===
No.	Title	Directed by	Original release date
1	"Mystery of the Alien Asteroid"	Unknown	March 19, 2019
When a strange alien object is discovered speeding through our Solar System, experts race to uncover if it is real evidence of extraterrestrial contact or a deadly asteroid on a collision course with Earth.
2	"Secrets of the Seven Earths"	George Harris	March 26, 2019
The new discovery of seven alien Earth-like planets in a faraway planetary system is a major milestone in the hunt for extraterrestrial life. Experts investigate the secrets of TRAPPIST-1's mysterious worlds to reveal if Earthlings are alone in the universe.
3	"Alien Hellstorms"	Unknown	April 2, 2019
Jupiter, Saturn, Uranus, and Neptune are homes to the deadliest storms in the Solar System, and new discoveries reveal the secrets of this alien weather, helping experts to understand these alien worlds better.
4	"Finding Alien Moons"	Unknown	April 9, 2019
New discoveries are helping experts in their search for the first alien moon outside the Solar System, which could be Earth-like worlds with the potential for life. They have not found any yet, but 21st century methods may succeed.
5	"Dark Secrets of the Solar System"	Unknown	April 16, 2019
New evidence is rewriting the history of the Solar System, and using the latest discoveries and cutting-edge technology, experts are investigating if our cosmic neighborhood once featured oversized alien Earths and a second sun.
6	"Is the Universe a Hologram?"	Unknown	April 23, 2019
Shocking new evidence has convinced some of the world's greatest physicists that the universe is a hologram. Using cutting-edge technology, they investigate the secrets of black holes and spacetime to build the case for this game-changing discovery.
7	"Curse of the Comets"	Unknown	April 30, 2019
New discoveries reveal secrets of comets, and using the latest technologies, experts might prove that these mysterious alien visitors are the reason for all life on Earth.
8	"Hunt for the Missing Black Holes"	Unknown	May 7, 2019
New discoveries might finally reveal how supermassive black holes are made, and using the latest technology, experts are on the verge of understanding how they grow and how they affect life on Earth.
9	"Wrath of the Sun"	Unknown	May 14, 2019
New discoveries reveal the apocalyptic threats that the Sun poses to life on Earth, and using the latest technologies, experts are uncovering the deadly secrets of the Solar System's star.
10	"Asteroid Apocalypse"	Unknown	May 21, 2019
New discoveries reveal the apocalyptic consequences of an asteroid strike, and using cutting-edge science, experts are racing to develop technologies that can destroy these deadly killers before they unleash Armageddon.
11	"Mars's Alien Secrets"	Unknown	May 28, 2019
The latest NASA missions to Mars might finally reveal if it is home to alien life, and using these new discoveries, experts are rethinking what they know about the Red Planet.

=== Season 7 (2020) ===
No.	Title	Directed by	Original release date
1	"Pluto: Back From The Dead"	Unknown	September 8, 2020
New images of the dwarf planet Pluto reveal an active world once thought to be geologically dead. And, using cutting-edge technology, experts uncover if there could be alien life on Pluto.
2	"Hunt for the Mars Aliens"	Unknown	September 15, 2020
NASA's brand-new Mars rover is on the hunt for alien life, and with the help of cutting-edge engineering, scientists embark on a search for fossilized remains, which might prove the Red Planet was once home to a vast ocean and extraterrestrial life.
3	"Killing the Milky Way"	Unknown	September 22, 2020
Scientists and astronomers explore why galaxies are going dark across the Milky Way.
4	"Jupiter: Mystery of the Solar System"	Unknown	September 29, 2020
Generations of astronomers have attempted to solve the mysteries of Jupiter, the most fierce and extreme planet in the Solar System, and now experts reveal new evidence that could unlock the secrets of why this planet is so strange.

=== Season 8 (2021) ===
No.	Title	Directed by	Original release date	U.S. viewers (millions)
1	"Mystery of Dead Planets"	Rob Elliott	March 31, 2021	0.295
Astronomers unmask the truly destructive nature of the cosmos.
2	"Space's Great Wall"	Nathan Budd	April 7, 2021	0.196
Astronomers discover a cosmic structure over a billion light years long.
3	"Curse of the White Holes"	Nathan Budd	April 14, 2021	N/A
Einstein's theory of relativity predicts the existence of white holes.
4	"Bermuda Triangle of Space"	Ross Kirby	April 21, 2021	0.233
Scientists have detected a region of space they have yet to understand.
5	"The Giant Ice Planets"	Unknown	April 28, 2021	0.180
Astronomers finally unlock the mysteries of Uranus and Neptune.
6	"Secrets of the Asteroids"	Tom Ranson	May 5, 2021	0.201
NASA investigates an asteroid in more detail than ever before.
7	"Space Force Declassified"	David Briggs	May 12, 2021	N/A
Discover the cutting-edge race to build the ultimate space weapon.
Special	"Secrets of the Hubble"	David Briggs	May 19, 2021	N/A
Two-hour episode that presents the history of the Hubble Space Telescope, its repairs, and some of the discoveries resulting from Hubble's images and data.
Special	"SpaceX and NASA: Mars and Beyond"	Unknown	May 26, 2021	N/A
Two-hour episode that chronicles the SpaceX Dragon 2 space capsule becoming the first private company to fly a crewed orbital spacecraft to the International Space Station.
Special	"The New Explorers"	Unknown	June 2, 2021	N/A
Two-hour episode that highlights missions to explore Pluto (New Horizons), Hubble Telescope (repair), asteroid Bennu (OSIRIS-REx), Mars (Curiosity) and Saturn (Cassini). This special is a repeat of the Space's Deepest Secrets episode "The Universe's Greatest Hits" (Season 1, Episode 1) with no changes except for new title.
