= The Planets and Beyond =

2017 American documentary TV series

- Season 2 title card
- Also known as: The Planets
- Genre: Documentary
- Presented by: Mike Massimino
- Narrated by: Erik Dellums
- Country of origin: United States
- Original language: English
- No. of seasons: 2

Production
- Running time: ca. 45 minutes

Original release
- Network: Science
- Release: August 22, 2017 – April 10, 2019

The Planets, retitled The Planets and Beyond for its second season, is a documentary television series produced by the Science Channel that aired from 2017 to 2019. It explores the planets and of the Solar System, exoplanets, and other astronomical objects.

== Format ==
Former astronaut Mike Massimino hosts the show, appearing briefly to introduce each segment of each episode, and Erik Dellums narrates the series. During its first season, titled The Planets, the series focused on planets exclusively except for a single episode which studied the Moon. Retitled The Planets and Beyond, the series expanded its focus during its second season to include other types of astronomical objects. The Science Channel also broadcast The Planets and The Planets and Beyond specials, some of them made up of original footage and others of segments broadcast previously on The Planets, The Planets and Beyond, How the Universe Works, Space's Deepest Secrets, and Strip the Cosmos.

== Episode list ==
=== Season 1 – The Planets (2017) ===
No.	Title	Directed by	Original release date
1	"Jupiter: King of the Planets"	Unknown	August 22, 2017
The exploration of Jupiter — the biggest and most extreme planet in the Solar System — may change humanity's understanding of the Solar System. Recent discoveries by the National Aeronautics and Space Administration (NASA) Juno mission uncover what lies beneath Jupiter's violent storms and reveal that Jupiter is more akin to a star than a planet.
2	"Mars: The Definitive Guide"	Unknown	August 30, 2017
The most detailed survey ever created of Mars – our closest planetary neighbor – reveals its dark history.
3	"Venus: The Hell Planet"	Unknown	September 5, 2017
Venus is a hellish planet covered in active volcanoes and dense clouds, and the possibility exists that Earth could be heading towards the same fate.
Special	"Dark Secrets on Mars"	Unknown	September 11, 2017
An exploration of Mars's greatest mysteries.
4	"Saturn: Mysteries Among the Rings"	Unknown	September 12, 2017
What the latest data gathered by the Cassini and Huygens probes tell us about Saturn and its rings, including Saturn′s giant icy geysers and powerful hurricanes, and about Titan, a Saturnian moon that may harbor life.
Special	"Saturn: The Cassini Secrets"	Unknown	September 15, 2017
The National Aeronautics and Space Administration (NASA) Cassini spacecraft concludes its 20-year mission to explore Saturn and its moons, and the special unveils what happened during Cassini's final moments and details how its discoveries revealed Saturn's deepest secrets.
Special	"Riddles of the Gas Giants"	Unknown	September 18, 2017
An exploration of the Solar System's two gas giants, Jupiter and Saturn.
5	"Planet 9: The Lost World"	Unknown	September 19, 2017
Planet Nine, an as-yet-undiscovered giant ninth planet, may orbit the Sun at the edge of the Solar System, and scientists have various theories about what it might be like.
Special	"Strange Secrets of Planet 9"	Unknown	September 25, 2017
Planet 9 is a hypothetical and mysterious world at the edge of the Solar System.
6	"Pluto: The Secret Science"	Unknown	September 26, 2017
The dwarf planet Pluto is a tiny frozen world, but appears to have an internal ocean that could harbor life.
Special	"Pluto's Greatest Mysteries"	Unknown	October 2, 2017
An exploration of the mysteries of Pluto.
7	"Alien Worlds: Stranger than Fiction"	Unknown	October 3, 2017
Astronomers are discovering exoplanets every day, including everything from worlds that appear to eat light to planets that resemble Earth.
Special	"Riddles of the Hell Planets"	Unknown	October 9, 2017
An exploration of some of the strangest planets in the universe.
8	"The Moon: Earth's Guardian Angel"	Unknown	October 10, 2017
The Moon is a world permanently tied to Earth, and new research has revealed its origin and how it played a role in life arising on Earth.

=== Season 2 – The Planets and Beyond (2018) ===
No.	Title	Directed by	Original release date
1	"Earth: The Secret History"	Unknown	March 20, 2018
A series of cataclysms formed the Earth and were essential to the rise of life — and Earth-like planets may exist elsewhere in the universe.
Special	"Mysteries on Mars"	Unknown	March 26, 2018
New discoveries about Mars are changing everything we know about the planet. The episode consists entirely of segments broadcast previously in The Planets episode "Mars: The Definitive Guide (Season 1 Episode 2) and the How the Universe Works episode "Life and Death on the Red Planet" (Season 5 Episode 6).
Special	"Earth & Moon: 2 Strange Rocks"	Unknown	March 26, 2018
The special relationship between the Earth and the Moon. The episode consists entirely of segments broadcast previously in The Planets and Beyond episode "Earth: The Secret History" (Season 2 Episode 1) and The Planets episode "The Moon: Earth's Guardian Angel" (Season 1 Episode 8).
2	"Alien Planets: Cosmic Nightmares"	Unknown	March 27, 2018
An exploration of the most violent, uninhabitable exoplanets discovered thus far.
Special	"Secrets of Alien Earths"	Unknown	April 2, 2018
Alien planets might be home to extraterrestrial life. The episode consists entirely of segments broadcast previously in The Planets and Beyond episode "Alien Planets: Cosmic Nightmares" (Season 2 Episode 2) and The Planets episode "Alien Worlds: Stranger Than Fiction" (Season 1 Episode 7).
3	"Milky Way: The Monster Inside"	Unknown	April 4, 2018
A supermassive black hole, Sagittarius A*, lies at its center of our galaxy, the Milky Way .
Special	"Mysteries of the Milky Way"	Unknown	April 9, 2018
The Milky Way's deadliest phenomena. The episode consists entirely of segments broadcast previously in The Planets and Beyond episode "Milky Way: The Monster Inside" (Season 2 Episode 3) and the How the Universe Works episode "Death of the Milky Way," also known as "Monsters of the Milky Way" (Season 6 Episode 4).
4	"Ends of the Solar System: Strange Frontiers"	Unknown	April 10, 2018
Our latest discoveries have increased our understanding of the dark and mysterious frontiers of the Solar System.
Special	"Secret Worlds of the Solar System"	Unknown	April 16, 2018
The latest NASA discoveries about the dark and mysterious frontiers of the Solar System. The episode consists entirely of segments broadcast previously in The Planets and Beyond episode "Ends of the Solar System: Strange Frontiers" (Season 2 Episode 4) and The Planets episode "Planet 9: The Lost World" (Season 1 Episode 5).
5	"Ice Giants: The Frozen Aliens"	Unknown	April 17, 2018
The ice giants — Uranus and Neptune — are the farthest planets from the Sun and are home to some of the Solar System′s strangest mysteries.
Special	"Secrets of Alien Giants"	Unknown	April 23, 2018
The strange secrets of the Solar System's largest planets. The episode consists entirely of segments broadcast previously in The Planets and Beyond episode "Ice Giants: The Frozen Aliens" (Season 2 Episode 5) and The Planets special "Saturn: The Cassini Secrets" (Season 1).
Special	"Curse of the Comets"	Unknown	April 30, 2018
The latest discoveries about comets. The episode consists entirely of segments broadcast previously in the Strip the Cosmos episode "Hunting a Comet" (Season 1 Episode 6) and the How the Universe Works episode "Comets - Frozen Wanderers" (Season 2 Episode 6).
Special	"The Sun: Secrets of Our Star"	Unknown	May 7, 2018
An exploration of the secrets of the Sun. The episode consists entirely of segments broadcast previously in the Strip the Cosmos episode "Inside the Sun" (Season 1 Episode 2) and the How the Universe Works episode "Journey from the Center of the Sun" (Season 3 Episode 1).
6	"Alien Galaxies: The Strange Secrets"	Unknown	July 24, 2018
A look at the universe's strangest galaxies, places that could be home to extraterrestrial life and supermassive black holes.
7	"Mercury: The Cursed Planet"	Unknown	July 31, 2018
Mercury is a tiny planet under constant attack by the Sun, and one day it might pose a threat to all life on Earth.
Special	"Life and Death in the Cosmos"	Unknown	August 6, 2018
An exploration of Mercury — one of the deadliest planets in the Solar System — as well as the places with the best chance of harboring extraterrestrial life. The episode consists entirely of segments broadcast previously in The Planets and Beyond episode "Mercury: The Cursed Planet" (Season 2 Episode 7) and the Space's Deepest Secrets episode "Expedition Extraterrestrial" (Season 3 Episode 7).
8	"Comets: Mysteries from the Deep"	Unknown	August 7, 2018
Comets are strange visitors from deep space that might be responsible for life existing on Earth.
Special	"Rise of the Galaxy Monsters"	Unknown	August 13, 2018
How galaxies work — and the dangerous forces lurking inside of them. The episode consists entirely of segments broadcast previously in The Planets and Beyond episodes "Alien Galaxies: The Strange Secrets" (Season 2 Episode 6) and "Milky Way: the Monster Inside" (Season 2 Episode 3).
9	"The Sun: Secrets of Our Star"	Unknown	August 14, 2018
Discoveries about Earth's star, the Sun, and how it will one day destroy the Earth.
Special	"The Sun's Forbidden Wonders"	Unknown	August 20, 2018
The strange truth behind the Sun's greatest mysteries. The episode consists entirely of segments broadcast previously in The Planets and Beyond episode "The Sun: Secrets of Our Star" (Season 2 Episode 9) and the How the Universe Works episode "Journey from the Center of the Sun" (Season 3 Episode 1).
10	"The Solar System: Alien Origins"	Unknown	August 21, 2018
The strange and violent birth of the Solar System — and how its planets were built from the wreckage of bygone alien worlds.
Special	"Riddles of our Solar System"	Unknown	August 27, 2018
Exploring the secrets of the Solar System. The episode consists entirely of segments broadcast previously in The Planets and Beyond episodes "The Solar System: Alien Origins" (Season 2 Episode 10) and "Ends of the Solar System: Strange Frontiers" (Season 2 Episode 4).
11	"Dwarf Planets: Aliens Among Us"	Unknown	August 28, 2018
The dwarf planets of the Solar System — mysterious worlds like Pluto that are too small to be a planet — are home to some of the universe's biggest secrets.
Special	"Curse of Alien Worlds"	Unknown	September 3, 2018
The strange and deadly secrets of alien worlds both inside and outside of the Solar System. The episode consists entirely of segments broadcast previously in The Planets and Beyond episode "Dwarf Planets: Aliens Among Us" (Season 2 Episode 11) and The Planets episode "Alien Worlds: Stranger Than Fiction" (Season 1 Episode 7).
12	"Alien Stars: Mystery of the Monsters"	Unknown	September 4, 2018
The deadliest stars in the universe can rip planets apart, but they might be integral to the existence of life on Earth.
Special	"The Universe's Deadliest Stars"	Unknown	September 10, 2018
The deadliest and most extreme stars in the universe. The episode consists entirely of segments broadcast previously in The Planets and Beyond episode "Alien Stars: Mystery of the Monsters" (Season 2 Episode 12) and the Space's Deepest Secrets episode "Rise of the Monster Star" (Season 2 Episode 8).
13	"Alien Volcanoes: Life in Hell"	Unknown	September 11, 2018
The volcanoes of distant planets could be hotbeds for extraterrestrial life.
Special	"Aliens of the Inferno"	Unknown	September 17, 2018
An exploration of volcanoes on alien worlds and on Earth. The episode consists entirely of segments broadcast previously in The Planets and Beyond episode "Alien Volcanoes: Life in Hell" (Season 2 Episode 13) and the Space's Deepest Secrets episode "Mysteries of Alien Volcanoes" (Season 2 Episode 5).
14	"Alien Moons: The Next Earth"	Unknown	September 18, 2018
Some of the moons of the Solar System could harbor extraterrestrial life.
Special	"The Moon's Evil Twins"	Unknown	September 24, 2018
The most bizarre moons that orbit other planets, the Solar System, and the strange secrets of the Earth's Moon. The episode consists entirely of segments broadcast previously in The Planets and Beyond episode "Alien Moons: the Next Earth" (Season 2 Episode 14) and The Planets episode "Jupiter: King of the Planets" (Season 1 Episode 1).
15	"Alien Oceans: Search for Life"	Unknown	September 25, 2018
The latest discoveries about the oceans of the Solar System provide new clues in the search for extraterrestrial life.
Special	"Hunt for Alien Oceans"	Unknown	October 1, 2018
The oceans of the Solar System and the alien origins of Earth's own seas. The episode consists entirely of segments broadcast previously in The Planets and Beyond episode "Alien Oceans: Search for Life" (Season 2 Episode 15) and the How the Universe Works episode "The First Oceans" (Season 4 Episode 7).

=== Special — The Planets and Beyond (2019) ===
No.	Title	Directed by	Original release date
Special	"Monster Black Hole: The First Image"	Unknown	April 10, 2019
For the first time, scientists have captured an image of a black hole. Experts explain how they did it, what they saw, and the significance of their achievement.
