= The Universe (TV series) =

American TV documentary series (2007–2015)

- Title screenshot of Seasons 1–3.
- Created by: Flight 33 Productions
- Narrated by: Erik Thompson; Gerrard McArthur (UK version)
- Country of origin: United States
- Original language: English
- No. of seasons: 9
- No. of episodes: 88 (List of episodes)

Production
- Running time: 44 minutes (for 1-hour episodes); 91 minutes (for 2-hour episodes)
- Production companies: Flight 33 Productions (81 episodes); Workaholic Productions (1 episode)

Original release
- Network: History Channel
- Release: May 29, 2007 – May 23, 2015

The Universe is an American documentary television series that features computer-generated imagery and computer graphics of astronomical objects in the universe plus interviews with experts who study in the fields of cosmology, astronomy, and astrophysics. The program was produced by Flight 33 Productions and Workaholic Productions.

The series premiered on May 29, 2007, on the History Channel and four subsequent seasons were aired until 2010. Starting from October 25, 2011, new episodes aired exclusively on H2 through May 23, 2015.

The series is rebroadcast on Viceland and Story Television.

== Format ==
The series covers topics concerning space exploration, the Solar System, and astronomical objects in the universe. It shows CGI renderings of these aforementioned, video footage, photographs, and views from scientists, project managers, engineers, advocates, writers and other experts. The episode "7 Wonders of the Solar System", and Season 6 were produced in 3D. The last two seasons focus on ancient mysteries that related to the universe and retitled as The Universe: Ancient Mysteries Solved.

== Episodes ==
| Season | Episodes | Originally released | |
| Season | Episodes | First released | Last released |
|---|---|---|---|
| 1 | 14 | May 29, 2007 | September 4, 2007 |
| 2 | 18 | November 27, 2007 | April 29, 2008 |
| 3 | 12 | November 11, 2008 | February 3, 2009 |
| 4 | 12 | August 18, 2009 | November 10, 2009 |
| 5 | 8 | July 29, 2010 | September 23, 2010 |
| 6 | 7 | October 25, 2011 | December 20, 2011 |
| 7 | 7 | February 14, 2012 | June 17, 2012 |
| 8 | 4 | March 1, 2014 | March 22, 2014 |
| 9 | 6 | April 18, 2015 | May 23, 2015 |

=== Season 1: 2007 ===
| No. overall | No. in season | Title | Original release date |
|---|---|---|---|
| 1 | 1 | "Secrets of the Sun" | May 29, 2007 |
A look at how the Sun was formed and how it could potentially die; its physical composition; how it makes energy; and the nature of solar eclipses, solar flares and sunspot activity.
| 2 | 2 | "Mars: The Red Planet" | June 5, 2007 |
A look at the planet Mars, the planet most similar to Earth in the Solar System; an examination of Olympus Mons the largest volcano in the Solar System; how NASA probes search for evidence of past life on the red planet, and what that life might have looked like.
| 3 | 3 | "End of the Earth" | June 12, 2007 |
A look at end of the world scenarios involving killer asteroid or comet impact events, gamma-ray bursts, The Big Rip, and the plans that scientists have to potentially save the Earth from an interstellar disaster.
| 4 | 4 | "Jupiter: The Giant Planet" | June 19, 2007 |
A look at the Solar System's largest planet, Jupiter; its formation and composition and its mini-Solar System of over 60 moons—some of which may have the potential to support extraterrestrial life.
| 5 | 5 | "The Moon" | June 26, 2007 |
A look at the formation of the Moon; how it played a role in the evolution of life on Earth; and the future plans of NASA to establish a permanent base on the surface.
| 6 | 6 | "Spaceship Earth" | July 10, 2007 |
A look at the planet Earth; how it was born out of a chaotic shooting gallery during the formation of the Solar System; how life could have begun here; and what could ultimately cause its destruction.
| 7 | 7 | "Mercury & Venus: The Inner Planets" | July 17, 2007 |
A look at the two most hostile planets in the Solar System—Mercury and Venus; one gouged with craters, the other a greenhouse cauldron of toxic gases and acid rain; both scorched by their close proximity to the sun. Scientists theorize about what sort of life could evolve on these alien worlds.
| 8 | 8 | "Saturn: Lord of the Rings" | July 24, 2007 |
A look at the planet Saturn and its fascinating rings; how they may have been created; how the latest probes have answered questions and revealed new mysteries about the planet, and how Saturn's moon Titan may hold more resources of petroleum than Earth will ever need.
| 9 | 9 | "Alien Galaxies" | July 31, 2007 |
A look at space through the amazing images of the Hubble Space Telescope; and a look at the formation of the Milky Way galaxy and how it is just one of hundreds of billions of galaxies in the universe.
| 10 | 10 | "Life & Death of a Star" | August 7, 2007 |
A look at stellar evolution; how gravity causes hydrogen gas to coalesce under friction and pressure to ignite in a flash of nuclear fusion, the energy and glow lasting billions of years, and then the ultimate demise in the largest and most colorful explosions in the cosmos.
| 11 | 11 | "The Outer Planets" | August 14, 2007 |
A look at the Solar System's most distant worlds—Uranus, a gas giant with the most extreme axial tilt of any known planet; its near-twin Neptune and its wildly orbiting moon Triton; and finally, distant Pluto which orbits the sun every 248 years.
| 12 | 12 | "Most Dangerous Places" | August 21, 2007 |
A look at the most dangerous objects known in space: all-consuming black holes, deadly gamma-ray bursts, powerful magnetars, and galactic collisions.
| 13 | 13 | "Search for E.T." | August 28, 2007 |
A look at possible extraterrestrial life in the universe; the mission of organizations like SETI to find it, and the possibility of extraterrestrial life existing right in our own Solar System on the moons of Europa and Titan.
| 14 | 14 | "Beyond the Big Bang" | September 4, 2007 |
A look back in time billions of years to the origin of the Big Bang. Leading physicists and historians theorize what happened before the bang occurred, how the physical nature of the universe unfolded as energy became matter forming stars and galaxies, and how the universe continues to expand outward at an ever-accelerating rate.

=== Season 2: 2007–08 ===
| No. overall | No. in season | Title | Original release date |
|---|---|---|---|
| 15 | 1 | "Alien Planets" | November 27, 2007 |
A look at the science of planet hunting; astronomers explain the technology and methods used to find extra-solar planets—worlds outside the Sun's Solar System orbiting other stars; and a look at some of the most interesting planets that have been discovered, such as "Hot Jupiters" and "Super-Earths."
| 16 | 2 | "Cosmic Holes" | December 4, 2007 |
A look at the mysteries of black holes and theories about the existence of other kinds of holes, such as "mini" or microscopic black holes that exist at the atomic level; "white holes"—the opposite of black holes where matter is ejected out; and "wormholes"—gateways in hyperspace that connect points in space and time and possibly lead to other dimensions.
| 17 | 3 | "Mysteries of the Moon" | December 11, 2007 |
A look at the Moon and the role it has played in the history of mankind—how it was once worshiped as a god; used as a timekeeper by farmers; a beacon for sailors at sea; and how it affects ocean tides and the behavior of animals. Also discussed is the transient lunar phenomenon which has baffled scientists for centuries.
| 18 | 4 | "The Milky Way" | December 18, 2007 |
A tour of the Milky Way; a look at the massive black hole with the mass of thousands of suns, that lies at its center; how the death of old stars provide the material to create new ones; and how stars from the galactic center are being catapulted beyond the outer arms at unimaginable speeds.
| 19 | 5 | "Alien Moons" | January 8, 2008 |
A look at Kuiper belt objects and the moons of the Solar System such as volcanic Io, ice covered Europa, and the mysterious Triton; scientists and physicist theorize as to what discoveries could be found there.
| 20 | 6 | "Dark Matter/Dark Energy" | January 15, 2008 |
A look at the theory of dark matter—the undetectable mass thought to make up 96% of the universe, and dark energy—the unseen force that is expanding the universe. Physicists use the latest cutting-edge technology and conduct groundbreaking experiments in an attempt to discover more about these mysterious forces.
| 21 | 7 | "Astrobiology" | January 29, 2008 |
A look at the science of astrobiology—the search for life in space by combining the disciplines of astronomy, biology and geology; a look at how life could evolve on planets vastly different than Earth; and a trip to an area in Australia to search for the oldest forms of life on Earth and what it could teach us about life on other worlds.
| 22 | 8 | "Space Travel" | February 5, 2008 |
A look at some revolutionary ideas about travel in space, from ship designs to innovative methods of propulsion such as solar sails and laser beams. Also a look at antimatter as a power source and the possibilities of faster-than-light travel that could make the greatest science fiction dream a reality.
| 23 | 9 | "Supernovas" | February 12, 2008 |
A look at the sensational death of stars in supernova explosions which shine as bright as a 100 billion suns and release jets of high-energy matter as gamma-ray bursts and x-ray radiation. Also a look at supernovas recorded throughout history and how stardust creates the building blocks of planets and life.
| 24 | 10 | "Constellations" | February 19, 2008 |
A look at some of the 88 constellations in the sky which are arrangements of stars that form a picture or symbol. Also how ancient civilizations developed and used them for navigation and exploration.
| 25 | 11 | "Unexplained Mysteries" | February 26, 2008 |
A look at some of the myths, misconceptions and facts about the universe, from life on Mars to whether or not time travel is possible and if Einstein's theories of relativity could support it.
| 26 | 12 | "Cosmic Collisions" | March 4, 2008 |
A look at the cosmic shooting gallery of the universe; what happens during comet, asteroid, and planetary collisions; the effects of mass extinction impacts; what happens when stars collide and when entire galaxies merge.
| 27 | 13 | "Colonizing Space" | March 11, 2008 |
A look at the efforts underway to establish permanent human colonies on the Moon and Mars; how food will be grown and waste recycled; and the plans to terraform Mars eventually to make it more habitable for humans.
| 28 | 14 | "Nebulas" | April 1, 2008 |
A look at nebulas—the "art gallery of the galaxy"—amazing regions of space where old stars die and new ones are born. Astronomers reveal the techniques and technology used to capture the details and wonder of these distant objects, many of which are too far away to be seen by the naked eye.
| 29 | 15 | "Wildest Weather in the Cosmos" | April 8, 2008 |
A look at bizarre weather phenomena on other worlds in the Solar System, such as tornadoes with 6,000 MPH winds and rain made of iron.
| 30 | 16 | "Biggest Things in Space" | April 15, 2008 |
A look at the biggest things in the universe, such as the cosmic web, which connects galaxies together along threads of dark matter, or the Lyman-alpha blob, which is a bubble containing countless galaxies. Also a look at super-galaxies, super massive black holes, "radio lobes", and the biggest void in space.
| 31 | 17 | "Gravity" | April 22, 2008 |
A look at the forces of gravity and the role it plays in the formation of the universe and the objects within it; how weightlessness affects astronauts in space; and how pilots experience the effects of gravity in their training on the "vomit comet".
| 32 | 18 | "Cosmic Apocalypse" | April 29, 2008 |
A look at how the universe could end, with various theories explored such as a "random quantum fluctuation" where everything is obliterated in the blink of an eye; where all energy is consumed and ends in a "cosmic ice age"; where everything collapses into black holes and disappears; and the Big Rip, where everything is ripped apart; and how there is nothing we can do to prevent the cosmic doomsday.

=== Season 3: 2008–09 ===
| No. overall | No. in season | Title | Original release date |
|---|---|---|---|
| 33 | 1 | "Deep Space Disasters" | November 11, 2008 |
A look at the history of space disasters and the potential for danger in space—from explosive launches, fiery reentries, fire in an oxygen-rich atmosphere, deadly micrometeoroid impacts, catastrophic solar flares and a host of other space hazards astronauts risk on every mission. Also discussed are what could happen if a ship encounters a black hole or gamma-ray burst.
| 34 | 2 | "Parallel Universes" | November 18, 2008 |
A look at the theory of the multiverse—the possibility of parallel dimensions existing where Earth and everyone on it are duplicated many times over, and how physicists search for evidence of these doppelganger realities using state of the art particle colliders that can detect higher dimensions of existence.
| 35 | 3 | "Light Speed" | November 25, 2008 |
A look at the speed of light, the ultimate speed limit enforced by the laws of the universe, and how scientists are looking for ways to exceed it; a look at what happens when we reach the "light barrier"; what could happen if we surpass it, and how the "cosmic constant" can be manipulated.
| 36 | 4 | "Sex in Space" | December 2, 2008 |
A look at experiments in human sexuality in space; the psychology of relationships and reproduction that must be addressed if mankind wish to colonize other planets; how pregnancy and birth could be handled in microgravity and the complications that could arise under such conditions; and the answer to whether or not sex has already been attempted during a space mission.
| 37 | 5 | "Alien Faces" | December 9, 2008 |
A look at how differently life on Earth has evolved between animals, from the deep ocean to those on land, their environments played a role in their design; and an imaginative look at how similar life could take form under vastly different environments of alien worlds.
| 38 | 6 | "Deadly Comets and Meteors" | December 16, 2008 |
A look at how comets and meteors played a role in the formation of the Solar System; their possible role in the Extinction of the dinosaurs; and the theories that cometary dust could bring alien viruses to Earth.
| 39 | 7 | "Living in Space" | December 23, 2008 |
A look at how human colonies could exist in space, from domed cities to underground bases, to orbital habitats, to hollowed-out asteroids. Also a look at how robots will play a role in space survival; how food will be grown; the advances in space suit and equipment technology; and a look at how resources could be gathered and processed to sustain such otherworldly colonies.
| 40 | 8 | "Stopping Armageddon" | January 6, 2009 |
A look at some of the ideas scientists are exploring to save Earth one day from an inevitable meteor impact, including ways to divert Near-Earth objects (NEOs) with laser beams, nuclear bombs, solar sails, satellites that act as artificial gravity sources, and rocket engines that could attach to and push them out of Earth's path.
| 41 | 9 | "Another Earth" | January 13, 2009 |
A look at how astronomers search for other Earth-like planets around other stars; which stars are candidates for possible discovery; and how techniques develop and the sensitivity of equipment improve will make finding another Earth just a matter of time.
| 42 | 10 | "Strangest Things" | January 27, 2009 |
A look at some of the most bizarre things in the universe such as odd moons, strange stars, exotic particles, mysterious black holes, and invisible dark matter.
| 43 | 11 | "Edge of Space" | February 3, 2009 |
A look at the prospects for the commercialization space, from $20 million vacation trips to the ISS, the possibility of orbital hotels, and spaceplane flights 120 miles above the Earth are just the beginning. Also a look at the hazards, such as cosmic radiation and space debris, that could spell disaster for these outerspace endeavors.
| 44 | 12 | "Cosmic Phenomena" | February 3, 2009 |
A look at various cosmic phenomena, both "good"—such as the beauty of the aurora borealis, the thrill of a meteor shower, the miracle of photosynthesis, and the "bad"—such as UV radiation that can "get under our skin", and solar flare activity that can not only scramble electronics, but could threaten life on Earth.

=== Season 4: 2009 ===
| No. overall | No. in season | Title | Original release date |
|---|---|---|---|
| 45 | 1 | "Death Stars" | August 18, 2009 |
A look at real life "death stars" that are far worse than the one in Star Wars such as supernovas that unleash massive gamma-ray bursts (GRB) that could eradicate all life for thousands of light years; a look at "WR 104", a dying star 8000 light years away that could point a GRB right at Earth, and "3C 321", a "death star galaxy" that could be a terrifying vision of what may befall the Milky Way galaxy. Eta Carinae and Betelgeuse are given as examples of stars that could have violent ends that are too close for comfort.
| 46 | 2 | "The Day the Moon Was Gone" | August 25, 2009 |
A look at the importance of the Moon and what the Earth would be like without it, such as a four hours of sunlight, pitch-black nights, 100 MPH winds spawning massive hurricanes, wild fluctuating climate changes as the planet topples on its axis, and the end of complex life forms—including humans.
| 47 | 3 | "It Fell From Space" | September 1, 2009 |
A look at some of the thousands of objects, both natural and man made, that have plummeted to Earth. From space rocks that have crashed into homes, to rocket parts that have landed on front lawns, the Chicxulub impact Which killed off the non-avian Dinosaurs, and scientists share their amazing insights into the phenomena of the cosmos from the study of this space debris.
| 48 | 4 | "Biggest Blasts" | September 8, 2009 |
A look at some of the biggest explosions known, from the "Big Bang", to incredible supernova blasts, to the massive impact of the Chicxulub asteroid on the Yucatán Peninsula that was believed to have wiped out the non-avian dinosaurs 65 million years ago.
| 49 | 5 | "The Hunt for Ringed Planets" | September 15, 2009 |
A look at planetary rings, especially those of Saturn where house-sized chunks of ice orbit at 53,000 MPH along a chaotic orbital racetrack; how the rings formed and the dangers they pose to spacecraft. Also a look at other rings around Jupiter, Uranus, Neptune, and possibly Mars; plus Earth's "ring" which is made of some 200 satellites in geosynchronous orbit—the only "man-made ring" in the known universe.
| 50 | 6 | "10 Ways to Destroy the Earth" | September 22, 2009 |
A look at ten events experts envision, (both fun and serious), that could destroy the planet Earth—such as being swallowed up by 2 Black holes, exploding it with antimatter, hurling it into the Sun, and stopping the spin.
| 51 | 7 | "The Search for Cosmic Clusters" | September 29, 2009 |
A look at star clusters; how all stars within them are formed from the same material and are approximately the same age; a look at the two kinds of clusters—"open clusters" which are young and exist in the spiral arms of the galaxy, and "globular clusters" which are old and exist in the outskirts of the galaxy and possibly as old as the universe itself.
| 52 | 8 | "Space Wars" | October 6, 2009 |
A look at military concepts to weaponize space; how such systems would work and how effective would they be, such as an idea of telephone pole-sized rods that could be hurtled down from orbit. Also a look at some more fantastic weapon ideas and defenses against such weapons, such as ground-based lasers.
| 53 | 9 | "Liquid Universe" | October 20, 2009 |
A look at places in the universe where it rains droplets of liquid iron, places at hundreds of degrees below zero where there are oceans of liquid methane, and at the center of gas giants where pressure is so great there exists liquid metallic hydrogen.
| 54 | 10 | "Pulsars & Quasars" | October 27, 2009 |
A look at pulsars—tiny objects (only a few miles across) with powerful magnetic fields that spin so fast they appear to blink on and off; and quasars—the remnant cores of ancient galaxies that are so distant from Earth that they may be the oldest things in the universe.
| 55 | 11 | "Science Fiction, Science Fact" | November 3, 2009 |
A look at fantastic technology concepts, once mocked by physicists, that could be just over the horizon, such as teleportation, anti-gravity, and breaking the light speed barrier. Once only achieved by Hollywood, these concepts are now gaining serious attention within the scientific community.
| 56 | 12 | "Extreme Energy" | November 10, 2009 |
A look at the energy emitted by the universe, from powerful jets ejected by black holes, to the nuclear fury of the sun; and how the universe maintains this energy in perfect balance through the conservation of energy.

=== Season 5: 2010 ===
| No. overall | No. in season | Title | Original release date |
|---|---|---|---|
| 57 | 1 | "7 Wonders of the Solar System" | July 29, 2010 |
A close up look at some of the most astonishing wonders of the Solar System, such as the geysers of Enceladus; Saturn's amazing rings; Jupiter's Great Red Spot; the heights of Olympus Mons on Mars; and Earth.
| 58 | 2 | "Mars: The New Evidence" | August 5, 2010 |
A look for evidence of life on Mars which provides many clues that it now, or once had supported it; from the remains of lakes and rivers that once flowed on the surface; to the water ice frozen at the poles; to the seasonal changes in methane gases that may prove bacterial life still thrives underground.
| 59 | 3 | "Magnetic Storm" | August 12, 2010 |
A look at magnetic storms—"Solar Katrinas" created by the sun with the power of ten thousand nuclear weapons that could cause global electrical blackouts, electronics malfunctions and communication disasters if one should hit the Earth.
| 60 | 4 | "Time Travel" | August 19, 2010 |
A look at time travel; how it could one day become reality; how Albert Einstein's theory of relativity claims it is possible, and the probable results of traveling to the future and the mind-boggling consequences of traveling to the past.
| 61 | 5 | "Secrets of the Space Probes" | August 26, 2010 |
A look at space probes, what they have done and found for us in space, and what they might do in the future, such as searching for Earth-like planets and for extraterrestrial life.
| 62 | 6 | "Asteroid Attack" | September 2, 2010 |
A look at asteroids and the impact they have or had on life now and before. Also, what spacecraft can tell us about them, what they can do to civilization, and the possibility of living on one.
| 63 | 7 | "Total Eclipse" | September 16, 2010 |
A look at the movements of the Earth, the Sun and the Moon during solar and lunar eclipses; how humans, even if not alone in the universe, may nevertheless be the only intelligent creatures to witness solar eclipses; and how astronomers discover planets in other star systems that partially eclipse or transit their stars.
| 64 | 8 | "Dark Future of the Sun" | September 23, 2010 |
A look at the future of the Sun and what might happen to it in five billion years when it uses up its hydrogen fuel and swells into a massive red giant star (consuming our planet and killing all life—including humans if any are still on it) and then shrinking into a white dwarf.

=== Season 6: 2011 ===
| No. overall | No. in season | Title | Original release date |
|---|---|---|---|
| 65 | 1 | "Catastrophes that Changed the Planets" | October 25, 2011 |
The planets of the Solar System have experienced epic catastrophes throughout their long history, both raining down from outside and bubbling up from within. A voyage back in time to investigate the violent events that shaped the planets, including Earth.
| 66 | 2 | "Nemesis: The Sun's Evil Twin" | November 1, 2011 |
Asks if the Sun has an evil twin named Nemesis, orbiting it and wreaking havoc on the planets at a 26 million-year interval. This episode explores the possibility of the existence of Nemesis and its dangerous influence on other objects in the Solar System.
| 67 | 3 | "How the Solar System was Made" | November 8, 2011 |
At 4.6 billion years old, the Solar System is our solid, secure home in the Universe. This episode traces the system's birth from a thin cloud of dust and gas.
| 68 | 4 | "Crash Landing on Mars" | November 22, 2011 |
What might happen if the first crewed mission to Mars crashes hundreds of miles from the rocket that would take them back home.
| 69 | 5 | "Worst Days on Planet Earth" | November 29, 2011 |
Earth may seem like the most hospitable planet in the Solar System. But new discoveries reveal the blue planet has been plagued by more chaos and destruction than scientists once imagined.
| 70 | 6 | "UFO: The Real Deal" | December 13, 2011 |
A look at the technology needed to build ships to the stars.
| 71 | 7 | "God and the Universe" | December 20, 2011 |
A scientific search for God. Also a look if the universe was made by a creator or just nature.

=== Season 7: 2012 ===
| No. overall | No. in season | Title | Original release date |
|---|---|---|---|
| 72 | 1 | "How Big, How Far, How Fast" | April 29, 2012 |
Astronomers attempt to grasp the mind-boggling extremes of size, distance and speed within our universe by bringing them down to earth.
| 73 | 2 | "Alien Sounds" | May 6, 2012 |
Is it true that in space nobody can hear you scream? Our scientists reveal that there are places in the universe that prove this sci-fi statement wrong.
| 74 | 3 | "Our Place in the Milky Way" | May 13, 2012 |
An inside look at the Earth's position in the Milky Way galaxy.
| 75 | 4 | "Deep Freeze" | May 20, 2012 |
A look at the coldest objects and places in the Solar System and the universe.
| 76 | 5 | "Microscopic Universe" | June 3, 2012 |
Particles are studied in an attempt to understand the universe.
| 77 | 6 | "Ride the Comet" | June 10, 2012 |
Following the path of a comet as it traverses the Solar System.
| 78 | 7 | "When Space Changed History" | June 17, 2012 |
Examining how objects from space may have altered the course of Human history.

=== Season 8: 2014 ===
| No. overall | No. in season | Title | Original release date |
|---|---|---|---|
| 79 | 1 | "Stonehenge" | March 1, 2014 |
Examining the possibility that Stonehenge was a prehistoric astronomical observatory, used to record the movements of the Sun and Moon.
| 80 | 2 | "Pyramids" | March 8, 2014 |
Examining the astronomical connections of the Pyramids of Giza.
| 81 | 3 | "Heavenly Destruction" | March 15, 2014 |
Examining possible astronomical explanations for the Biblical account of the destruction of Sodom and Gomorrah, including the possibility of asteroid impact.
| 82 | 4 | "Star of Bethlehem" | March 22, 2014 |
Examining possible astronomical explanations for the Star of Bethlehem in the Bible, which guided the Magi to the location of the birth of Jesus, including the possibility of Halley's Comet.

=== Season 9: 2015 ===
| No. overall | No. in season | Title | Original release date |
|---|---|---|---|
| 83 | 1 | "Omens of Doom" | April 18, 2015 |
Examining the interpretations by ancient peoples of celestial phenomena as bad omens, and the impact that the perceived omens may have had on history.
| 84 | 2 | "The Eye of God" | April 25, 2015 |
Examining strange shapes of the universe, such as the "Eye of God", the hexagon on Saturn, and the "face" on the Moon.
| 85 | 3 | "Apocalyptic Visions" | May 2, 2015 |
Explores the end of the world, from a deadly asteroid impact, to the Sun as a Red giant, to the Ultimate fate of the universe.
| 86 | 4 | "Alien Worlds" | May 9, 2015 |
Examining the possibility of other planets existing in the universe.
| 87 | 5 | "Predicting the Future" | May 16, 2015 |
Examining whether tracking astronomical phenomena can actually predict the future.
| 88 | 6 | "Roman Engineering" | May 23, 2015 |
Examining Roman engineering and its impact on life in Ancient Rome.
