= 2016 in American television =

In American television in 2016, notable events included television show debuts, finales, and cancellations; channel launches, closures, and rebrandings; stations changing or adding their network affiliations; and information about controversies and carriage disputes.

== Notable events ==
=== January ===
Date	Event	Source
1	Bob Eubanks and Stephanie Edwards co-host the local telecast of the Rose Parade on CW affiliate KTLA/Los Angeles for the final time. The duo announced in September 2015 that they were relinquishing their hosting duties for the annual event, an assignment that dated back to 1982.	
1	Full episodes of The Tonight Show Starring Johnny Carson return to American television, airing nightly on Antenna TV, the result of an agreement between the Tribune Broadcasting-owned multicast network and Carson Productions. The airings, billed simply as Johnny Carson (as NBC has ownership of The Tonight Show brand) consist of episodes taped in Burbank between 1972 and 1992 (90-minute episodes made from 1980 and earlier air on weekends, while 60-minute broadcasts made from 1980 onward air weeknights). This date's re-airing of the January 1, 1982, episode, which featured Eddie Murphy and McLean Stevenson as guests, marks the first time the Carson-era Tonight Show has aired on television (outside of a compiled clip series) since Carson's retirement in May 1992.	
1	WSVI, the ABC affiliate serving the United States Virgin Islands, ends its affiliation with the network due to technical issues and joins Ion Television. Lilly Broadcasting, owners of WSEE-TV in Erie, Pennsylvania, which already serves as the default CBS affiliate in the Virgin Islands, is commissioned to provide a replacement ABC affiliate for cable viewers, and promptly imports WENY-TV in Elmira, New York.	
7	NBCUniversal formally launches Seeso, a subscription-based, over-the-top streaming service featuring new and classic comedy programming including stand-up comedy specials, and episodes of series such as Saturday Night Live and Monty Python's Flying Circus as well as original series, was initially available for $3.99 per month. The site soft-launched on December 3, 2015, with a one-month, web-only beta trial offered to prospective subscribers	
7	More than a dozen television stations owned by Cordillera Communications in the Western and Southern United States are removed from Dish Network in a retransmission dispute. The stations are restored on January 10 after the two sides reach an agreement.	
9	The Kansas City Chiefs defeat the Houston Texans in an AFC Wild Card playoff game. ESPN's coverage of the game is simulcast on sister broadcast network ABC, making it the first National Football League game to air on the latter network since Super Bowl XL in 2006. ABC previously held the rights to Monday Night Football from 1970 until it shifted over to ESPN at the start of the 2006 season. ABC is still required to air the games in both teams' primary market.	
12	ABC Family rebrands as Freeform. The rebranding, the result of audience tests that revealed infrequent viewers perceived the channel as strictly family-oriented, firms the network's programming focus towards teenagers and young adults ages 14–34 (or "becomers", as the network terms them). It also, according to network president Tom Ascheim, refutes claims that founding owner Christian Broadcasting Network has required "Family" to permanently remain in the channel's name since its 1990 sale to International Family Entertainment. Freeform will maintain much of the former ABC Family's existing programming including feature films, series (including Shadowhunters, which premieres on this date), seasonal programming blocks, and religious programs (most notably weekday airings of The 700 Club, which CBN does require the channel to air.	
14	TouchVision discontinues operations. Based at Weigel Broadcasting's Chicago headquarters, the service provided newsreel-style news coverage tailored to a younger demographic, offering content to mobile and tablet platforms as well as select television stations.	
17	Master of None and Mr. Robot are among the notable TV winners at the 21st Critics' Choice Awards, an event simulcast live on A&E, Lifetime and LMN. For the first time, the event combines categories comprising its previously separate television and film ceremonies into a single three-hour telecast, the result of a September 2015 decision reached by the Broadcast Television Journalists Association and the Broadcast Film Critics Association.	
18	In a series of tweets she stated that while she had "only ever liked boys" in the past and that she was "open to liking any gender," Girl Meets World star Rowan Blanchard, 14 at the time, confirms that she is queer, marking the first time a teenage entertainer from a current Disney Channel television series to come out and reveal their sexual preference.	
18	Almost a month after the controversy (in which he mistakenly announced Ariadna Gutiérrez of Colombia as the winner of Miss Universe 2015 and Pia Wurtzbach of the Philippines as the first runner-up), comedian and host Steve Harvey breaks his silence and addresses his stint as the pageant's host in a two-part special episode of his eponymous talk show. The episodes, titled "Miss Universe: The Truth", also features exclusive interviews with Wurtzbach alongside Miss USA 2015 winner and second runner-up Olivia Jordan in part one, and Gutiérrez in part two.I	
19	Major League Baseball reaches an agreement to expand its offerings of online game broadcasts, including team-specific packages. The agreement comes on the day a trial against MLB, Comcast, and DirecTV was to have begun. The class action lawsuit, filed by a group of fans, sought to overturn MLB's placement of territorial restrictions for "out of market" broadcasts and blackouts of "in market" games.	
23	ABC begins airing a package of eight selected NBA games on Saturday evenings under the NBA Saturday Primetime on ABC banner. The move will also see the network airing only six single Sunday afternoon games, ending the doubleheaders that resulted in the adjustments to the scheduling of NBA broadcasts. Sister cable channel ESPN will continue to air NBA telecasts on Wednesday and Friday evenings.	
27	Nexstar Broadcasting Group agrees to acquire Media General in a $4.6 billion deal. Should regulatory approval be obtained, the combined company, to be known as Nexstar Media Group, will become the largest broadcaster in terms of audience reach, owning or operating 171 full-power stations in 100 markets. The deal comes after Meredith Corporation backs out of its deal to acquire Media General. That deal, announced in September 2015, came before Nexstar announced its own larger, unsolicited bid for Media General.	
27	Sinclair Broadcast Group announces it will acquire Tennis Channel in a $350 million deal.	
29	Nexstar Broadcasting Group stations in nine markets are removed from Cox Communications' cable systems at midnight due to a retransmission dispute. The stations return to Cox Cable after the two sides reach an agreement on February 4.	

=== February ===
Date	Event	Source
1	The National Football League announces that CBS and NBC will share the league's Thursday Night Football package in the 2016 and 2017 seasons. Both networks will each air and produce five games and NFL Network will simulcast those games and air eight additional games exclusively.	
1	KTSF 26/San Francisco's main signal transitioned from 4:3 to 16:9, which allowed local programming and the Cantonese and Mandarin newscasts to be broadcast in widescreen.	
1	The E. W. Scripps Company and Time Warner Cable quietly come to terms on a new carriage and retransmission consent contract. This is ahead of time for the former Journal Communications stations merged into Scripps in April 2015 (whose previous agreement would have ended on July 31), and averts any threat of Scripps' NBC stations being removed from Time Warner systems during the 2016 Summer Olympics.	
1	MyNetworkTV affiliate WMYD in Detroit, Michigan, changes its DT2 subchannel's affiliation from Cozi TV to Antenna TV after Antenna TV was removed from WADL's DT4 subchannel in August 2015. Strangely, Cozi ended up on WADL's DT4 subchannel.	
1	CBS affiliate WJHL-TV in Johnson City, Tennessee, affiliates its DT2 subchannel with ABC, taking the Tri-Cities' ABC affiliation from WKPT-TV. In a statement by George DeVault, president of Holston Valley Broadcasting, owners of WKPT-TV, he stated that despite negotiating in good faith with a "loyal" affiliate of ABC, and having agreed in principle on a 5-year extension, the network had chosen to explore other options, and showed a preference to being affiliated with a station owned by a larger group (WJHL-TV is owned and operated by Media General). WKPT-TV would shut down its news operations on January 29, three days before switching to MyNetworkTV (which would take that affiliation from sister station WAPK-CD, who in turn would take WJHL-DT2's former MeTV affiliation).	
3	With advancing age and health issues limiting his abilities to run the company, 92-year-old Sumner Redstone steps down as executive chairman at CBS Corporation. CEO Leslie Moonves is named Redstone's successor, while his daughter Shari Redstone retains her role as vice chairman. Redstone will retain a title of chairman emeritus at CBS, the same title he acquires on February 4 at Viacom, whose board names Philippe Dauman to succeed him as its executive chairman.I	
7	Super Bowl 50, in which the Denver Broncos defeat the Carolina Panthers, attracts 111.9 million viewers to CBS' English-language broadcast, the third most watched program in TV history. The game is also simulcast in Spanish on ESPN Deportes.	
12	Univision and Donald Trump confirm that they reached a confidential out-of-court settlement in a breach-of-contract lawsuit Trump filed against Univision. The Spanish-language broadcaster had backed out of its commitment in 2015 to air the Miss USA pageant in light of comments Trump expressed in the early days of his presidential campaign regarding illegal immigration to the United States. The comments resulted in a major fallout with celebrities, sponsors, and other pageant backers, including NBCUniversal, which exited from its joint venture with Trump in the Miss Universe Organization (Trump would buy out NBCU's stake and later sell the full organization to WME/IMG).	
13	Kanye West performs two songs from his album The Life of Pablo on Saturday Night Live, before announcing the release of his album exclusively on Tidal at the conclusion of his second performance. While the exclusivity window was believed to be permanent, the album was released through several other competing services starting in April.	
15	Kendrick Lamar and Taylor Swift are among the notable winners at the 58th Grammy Awards. The show airs on CBS, which offers an option for Pacific and Mountain time zone stations to air the broadcast live, allowing the event to air live in all time zones for the first time ever.	
17	ABC announces that its entertainment president, Paul Lee, has left the network. Channing Dungey is immediately tapped as Lee's successor, becoming the first African-American to head programming at a major broadcast network.	
28	MSNBC confirms it has parted ways with on-air host Melissa Harris-Perry. The move comes two days after it was revealed that Harris-Perry, in an e-mail to co-workers, voiced frustration over recent pre-emptions of her eponymous weekend show for expanded election coverage, editorial control of her show, and lack of communication from network executives over those issues.	
28	Spotlight (best picture) and Mad Max: Fury Road (six awards) are among the notable winners at the 88th Academy Awards. Chris Rock hosts the ABC telecast, an event that faced controversy coming in over the absence of minorities in the major acting categories for the second consecutive year. Meanwhile, despite Hawaii being five hours behind the Eastern Time Zone, KITV/Honolulu (under their new ownership of SJL Broadcasting) ends its practice of tape-delaying the Academy Awards to prime time and, for the first time, joins the rest of the ABC affiliates in airing the Oscars live as it happens, 3:30 PM local time.time	
29	Raleigh-area stations WRAL-TV and WNCN swap their network affiliations, with WRAL joining NBC and WNCN joining CBS. The switch comes after management of the Capitol Broadcasting-owned WRAL could not meet what it called "one-sided" reverse compensation demands from CBS.	
29	H2, History's secondary network, becomes Viceland, a lifestyle channel aimed at millennials which will include programming about music, cooking, sports, technology and hard-hitting documentaries. The change comes after A&E Networks purchased a 10% stake in Vice Media, Inc. in August 2014.	
29	Tribune Media announces that it will review various "strategic alternatives" to increase the company's value to shareholders, which include a possible sale of the entire company and/or select assets, or the formation of programming alliances or strategic partnerships with other companies, due to the decrease in its stock price since its August 2014 spin-off of Tribune Publishing and a $385 million revenue write-down for the 2015 fiscal year, partly due to original scripted programming expenditures for WGN America since it converted the cable network from a superstation in 2014. In addition to WGN America, Tribune Media's assets include 42 television stations (two of which are operated under shared services agreements with Dreamcatcher Broadcasting), regional cable news channel Chicagoland Television and a 30% stake in Food Network (which is majority owned by Scripps Interactive).	

=== March ===
Date	Event	Source
4	Four Spanish language networks owned by Univision Communications (Univision, UniMás, Galavisión and Univision Deportes) are removed by AT&T U-verse nationwide due to a carriage dispute. The Univision-owned networks were re-added by the provider on March 24, 2016, following the signing of a new retransmission agreement with the broadcaster.	
15	Dish Network sues NBCUniversal for breach of contract in reply to their ongoing carriage dispute. Three days later, it announced it will continue to carry NBCU's channels for another 10 days while seeking arbitration from the FCC.	
23	Georgia's supreme court overturns a lower court injunction that prevented Gray Television from combining operations of Augusta NBC affiliate WAGT with its own WRDW-TV (CBS). Gray acquired WAGT as part of its purchase of Schurz Communications' broadcast properties, a deal the FCC approved on the condition that Gray and Schurz terminate WAGT's shared services and joint sales agreements with Media General-owned ABC affiliate WJBF. Media General won the injunction on February 26, which was 10 days after Gray took over WAGT, arguing their agreements to operate WAGT were still in force until their expiration in 2020. The FCC on March 10 launches an investigation into Media General's actions in the matter, with Media General agreeing on July 14 to pay a $700,000 fine.	
28	OK!TV is rechristened Celebrity Page. The retitling of the program is the result of a change in content partners for the Unconventional Studios-produced, Trifecta-distributed entertainment news program, from American Media (parent of OK! magazine) to the Meredith Corporation, whose lifestyle print magazines will provide content for the show. It returns Meredith content to television syndication ten months after the broadcasting and publishing company's national version of the Better Show was canceled.	
28	Georgia Governor Nathan Deal announces he will veto a bill passed by the state's legislature that would allow businesses in the state to deny services based on their religious beliefs. The legislation, HB 757, referred to as the Free Exercise Protection Act), faced opposition and boycott threats from several studios, producers, and media companies involved in the state's TV industry, who contend that the bill would allow discrimination against those in the LGBT community.	
28	A cross-show, cross-network meeting of DC Universe characters takes place, as Barry Allen (Grant Gustin of The CW's The Flash) travels into National City's dimension to team with Kara Danvers (Melissa Benoist) in the "Worlds Finest" episode of CBS' Supergirl. It's the first crossover involving a CW series character on a CBS program. Both Flash and Supergirl are produced by Warner Bros. Television and DC Entertainment. Their parent company, Warner Bros., owns The CW equally with CBS. Supergirl would move to The CW before the start of its second season.	
29	The FCC commences an incentive auction to acquire broadcast spectrum used by television stations. The two-phase process, which is expected to conclude by autumn, began with a "reverse auction" on May 31, participating stations (about 1,800 in 150 markets that transmit on UHF channels 30 to 51 are eligible) are offered bids from the FCC to sell part or all of their bandwidth, with price estimates descending in each round. A "forward auction" followed on August 16, in which the repurposed spectrum will be sold to telecommunications providers, at escalating bids, to upgrade and expand their wireless broadband and Wi-Fi networks. Stations that opt to sell their bandwidth will be given the option to cease or continue operations (those choosing the latter can enter into an agreement with another station's owner to share a digital channel). Most stations that remain in operation will be subsequently reassigned to lower channel numbers, with their vacated frequencies reallocated for wireless use. Revenue to be accrued from the sale/repurposing of spectrum is projected to be as much as $60 billion, with most of the proceeds going to the broadcasters.	
30	CBS announces an affiliation deal with WWAY/Wilmington, NC to move its programming to the station's DT2 subchannel on January 1, 2017 (The move will not affect WWAY's primary affiliation with ABC; the DT2 channel currently carries The CW). CBS will move from low-powered WILM-LD (owned by Capitol Broadcasting Company, which dropped CBS from WRAL-TV/Raleigh on February 29).	
30	WTAE-TV/Pittsburgh dismisses news anchor Wendy Bell after she posts material on her official Facebook page considered stereotypical of African-Americans in the aftermath of a mass shooting in Wilkinsburg, PA that claimed five lives. In the post, which was later taken down, Bell described the killers, who were yet to be identified or arrested, as "young black men" who the criminal justice system was familiar with and who "have multiple siblings from multiple fathers and their mothers work multiple jobs." Management for the ABC-affiliated WTAE and parent company Hearst Television said Bell's comments displayed an "egregious lack of judgment" and "were inconsistent with the company's ethics and journalistic standards." Bell, who had been an 18-year veteran of WTAE, claims she was referring to black-on-black crime in general and didn't get a "fair shake" from the station.	
31	In the wake of a Hollywood Reporter investigation into "pay-to-play" casting workshops, ABC Studios dismisses Criminal Minds casting director Scott David. David, who had been with the CBS series since its 2005 debut, was profiled as one of several proprietors of acting workshops, David's being The Actors Link, that charge actors to perform scenes for and gain advice from those directly involved in the casting of TV projects — in essence, paying a fee to audition. Such a practice has been deemed illegal under a 2009 California law known as The Krekorian Talent Scam Prevention Act that has never been fully enforced by local officials.	

=== April ===
Date	Event	Source
1	The Nexstar-owned Lafayette, Louisiana, duopoly of KLAF-LD (NBC) and KADN (Fox) launch a news department, beginning with three weekday and two Saturday and Sunday newscasts on KLAF, and a weeknight-only prime time newscast on KADN. A weekday morning newscast on KLAF subsequently debuted on April 4. The programs on KLAF-LD replace news simulcasts from Baton Rouge sister station WVLA-TV, which KLAF had carried since it became Lafayette's NBC affiliate on July 1, 2015, while the KADN newscast replaces a five-minute news summary that previously aired on the station. The launch of the news department follows the physical expansion and equipment upgrade of the KLAF/KADN studios in Lafayette.	
1	John McMurray, a meteorologist at WJRT-TV/Flint/Tri-Cities (whose reports were also syndicated on several Michigan radio stations, earning him the nickname "Michigan's Weatherman"), retires after 47 years on the air.	
4	Fox affiliate WZDX/Huntsville, Alabama, debuts its in-house news department with the relaunch of its nightly 9:00 p.m. newscast, which expands from 30 to 60 minutes. The change followed the April 3 termination of a news share agreement with Calkins Media-owned WAAY-TV that – since it took over production of the program from the Independent News Network in September 2009 – saw the ABC affiliate produce news content for WZDX (which was acquired by Nexstar Broadcasting Group as part of its 2013 purchase of Grant Broadcasting System II), as well as Nexstar's $3.3 million renovation of the station's studio facility in northern Huntsville.	
4	The Villanova Wildcats defeat the North Carolina Tar Heels 77–74 in the NCAA Men's Division I Basketball Championship, which aired on cable television for the first time ever as part of a deal which will see the championship alternate between TBS and CBS.	
4	CBS began taping back-to-back seasons of the long-running reality game show Survivor at Mamanuca Islands, Fiji one month apart starting with Millennials vs. Gen X, beginning a tradition of taping at the island as its new permanent location, as confirmed by the host Jeff Probst prior to the airing of the 35th installment.	
5	The Starz Inc. channels undergo a brand reformatting, as Starz introduces a new universal logo for its channels and Encore is renamed Starz Encore to unify the brand identity for the group's two flagship premium cable channels. The extension of the Starz brand to Encore (which ironically launched Starz in 1994, as part of its themed multiplex) will also include the addition of repeats of Starz original programming on some of the latter's channels. The Starz reformat also corresponds with the launch of the network's over-the-top/TV Everywhere service equivalent to HBO Now and Showtime's OTT service for mobile devices and digital media players simply known as Starz, and the merger of Encore and MoviePlex content from their individual apps – Encore Play and MoviePlex Play – into that service.	
7	Trent Harmon was named the winner of the 15th installment of American Idol, while La'Porsha Renae is runner-up. The finale is notable on showcasing performances by past winners and finalists as it marked the final season (entitled The Farewell Season) to be aired on Fox after 15 years of air; American Idol would go for a year hiatus and air its succeeding sixteenth season under the new network of ABC nearly two years later on March 11, 2018, following an announcement on November 6, 2017.	
11	Calkins Media announces that the company will sell its three television stations (all of which are ABC affiliates) to Raycom Media. Raycom will acquire WWSB/Sarasota and WTXL-TV/Tallahassee, Florida, outright, while its partner company American Spirit Media will acquire the license assets of WAAY-TV/Huntsville, Alabama, with Raycom likely operating it under an outsourcing agreement with its existing NBC affiliate in that market, WAFF.	
12	Al Jazeera America ceases programming with a three-hour retrospective special. Lauded for its journalism since its August 2013 launch, the network was plagued by persistently low ratings (particularly during prime time), lack of tanglible cable carriage, and internal controversies. A limited number of the approximately 700 staffers laid off by the shutdown of AJAM and its website, which went into archive-only mode on February 26, may be transferred to its sister network, the Qatar-based Al Jazeera English.	
14	After 11 years, USA Network retires its "Characters Welcome" slogan in favor of a new brand positioning, "We the Bold", that encapsulates the network's evolved programming strategy.	
17	The Sunday edition of NBC's morning news/talk show Today makes a revamp with the debut of Sunday Today with Willie Geist. The newly reformatted program, anchored by the weekday show's third-hour anchor Willie Geist, provides news coverage and in-depth profiles of the people and ideas shaping American culture, such as a behind-the-scenes look at the Broadway musical Hamilton seem in the premiere. The new format brings it into line with its rival, CBS News Sunday Morning where Geist's father Bill has been a longtime contributor.	
20	Saying in a statement that they are "an inclusive company," ESPN dismisses Curt Schilling for unacceptable conduct after he shares a photo on Facebook deemed critical of transgender people. It is the latest in a series of controversial political statements made by the former Major League Baseball pitcher turned ESPN analyst.	
21	With the sudden passing of Prince at his Paisley Park Studios complex/home on this date, TV Guide changed their background logo from red to purple, joining the local media outlets in the Minneapolis–Saint Paul market, along with other businesses based in the area, in honor of the musician. In addition, MTV also changed its logo to purple and suspended its regular programming to air Prince's videos and movies as a tribute to being a core artist on the channel during its days as a non-stop music video channel. Two days later, Jimmy Fallon hosted a retrospective Saturday Night Live special titled "Goodnight Sweet Prince" featuring Prince's past performances on the show, as well as a compilation of clips of "The Prince Show", in which Fred Armisen as Prince and Maya Rudolph as Beyoncé hosted a talk show together.	
25	KICU-TV/San Jose rebrands from "TV 36" to "KTVU Plus." The new branding for the Fox-owned independent station reflects KICU's relationship to its Fox-affiliated Bay Area sister station KTVU/Oakland and includes an expansion of KTVU-produced news programming on KICU.	
26	The Department of Justice and the FCC approves the merger between Time Warner Cable and Charter Communications, including Charter's acquisition of Bright House Networks. The finalized deal is subject to conditions, including requirements for Charter to refrain from implementing usage-based billing, nor use its dominant position to hinder online video services (including a prohibition on interconnection fees). Charter would formally complete the transactions on May 18, becoming the second-largest cable provider in the U.S. On the same day, Time Warner and Charter both rebrand as Spectrum.	
27	Core Media Group – the parent of 19 Entertainment, the production company behind American Idol and So You Think You Can Dance – files for Chapter 11 bankruptcy protection in the wake of falling profits and the ratings decline of Idol that resulted in the series ending its 15-year run. Among the parties who Core owes money to include $3.37 million to creator Simon Fuller and an additional $398 million to third parties, including Tennenbaum Capital Partners and Crestview Media Investors.	
28	After setting his own car on fire, a 25-year-old man dressed in a panda costume and surgical mask who claimed to have a bomb strapped to his chest enters the lobby of the facility housing Sinclair Broadcast Group's Baltimore flagship stations, WBFF (Fox), WNUV (The CW) and WUTB (MyNetworkTV), and demands them to broadcast his message about the U.S. space program, resulting in the evacuation of staff from the studio complex. After exiting the studios, the man is later shot and wounded by police, who discover that the supposed bomb was in fact a flotation device filled with aluminum foil-wrapped chocolate candy bars with wiring attached to them.	

=== May ===
Date	Event	Source
1	General Hospital and the Live hosting team of Kelly Ripa and Michael Strahan are among the notable winners at the 43rd Daytime Emmy Awards. The ceremony has an online-only broadcast for the second time in three years, one year after a successful conventional telecast on Pop.	
2	The Loud House premieres on Nickelodeon and becomes the number-one children's animated series on television within its first month on the air.	
6	Network Knowledge, a member network of four PBS stations (three full-power outlets and one translator) serving Central Illinois, drastically reduces its broadcast schedule over-the-air to offer 12 to 13 hours of programming a day (weekdays from 10:00 a.m.-10:00 p.m. and weekends from 10:00 a.m.-11:00 p.m.), as part of money-saving efforts enacted to account for the Illinois state budget stand-off, along with other further reductions in donor revenue and production contracts. The regional network continues to provide a 24-hour schedule over local cable providers and AT&T U-verse through a direct fiber optic link to Comcast (the schedule reduction also affects satellite providers DirecTV and Dish Network, which both receive the signals of the Network Knowledge stations through the OTA feed).	
7	A revamped weekend edition of CBS' evening newscast debuts. Titled the CBS Weekend News and anchored by Reena Ninan (on Saturdays) and Elaine Quijano (on Sundays), the newscast draws from the resources of the network's online news channel, CBSN.	
9	NBC Sports confirms that Mike Tirico will join the network effective July 1, becoming its lead play-by-play announcer for the late half of the season of Thursday Night Football, which is shared with NFL Network. He officially joins the network on July 14 as part the network's coverage of The Open Championship. Tirico had been a 25-year veteran of ESPN, where he covered various sports in an anchor or announcer capacity, most notably play-by-play on Monday Night Football since 2006. Tirico will be succeeded in the ESPN MNF booth by Sean McDonough. However, the NFL officially nixes the plan for Tirico to announce TNF games on August 20, claiming that contract language for NBC to carry the late half games specifies that the network's top team of Al Michaels and Cris Collinsworth are required to announce the games without a possibility of substitution, despite their commitments to Sunday Night Football.	
12	CBS officially announces the cancellation of CSI: Cyber after two seasons, ending the sixteen season television run of the CSI franchise. The network also announces that freshman drama Supergirl will move to The CW for its second season, with the latter network now airing four original DC Comics based series across its prime time lineup (alongside Arrow, Legends of Tomorrow and The Flash).	
13	Michael Strahan ends his four-year-run as co-host of Live with Kelly and Michael. It is a bittersweet end to what had been a controversial situation, which began on April 19 when Strahan announced he would leave the show to become a full-time host on ABC's Good Morning America, which he joined as a correspondent in 2014. Caught by surprise by Strahan's announcement, Live co-host Kelly Ripa was absent for three episodes (the latter two coinciding with an already planned vacation with husband Mark Consuelos), reportedly in protest over what she felt was ABC's prioritization of GMA over Live (the latter is distributed by ABC's syndication arm). With Strahan's departure, guest co-hosts will sit alongside Ripa on Live until a permanent co-host is named.	
14	Logo broadcasts the 2016 Eurovision Song Contest. This was the first time that the annual pan-European song competition was broadcast live on American television.	
15	For the first time in its history, The Simpsons incorporates a live-to-air animation segment featuring motion capture technology. The three-minute live scene, part of the episode "Simprovised" (in which Homer Simpson takes up improvisational theatre), features Homer (voiced by Dan Castellaneta) talking about things he "could only be saying live on that day" and answering questions fielded from viewers on Twitter between May 1 and May 4.	
15	In recognition of his retirement from CBS News, Morley Safer is feted by 60 Minutes with a one-hour tribute titled "Morley Safer: A Reporter's Life", a special – airing as part of an extended two-hour edition of the newsmagazine – which chronicled his journalism career and notable stories during his tenure with the program. Safer (who died four days later on May 19) had been a correspondent with 60 Minutes since 1970.	
16	A U.S. District Court judge dismisses WHDH/Boston's lawsuit against NBC parent Comcast, clearing the way for the network to set up its own NBC O&O station in the Boston market (possibly using the company's existing Telemundo station WNEU) on January 1, 2017, one day after its contract with WHDH expires. WHDH owner Sunbeam Television filed the suit on March 10 in a challenge to the move NBC originally announced on January 7. WHDH contended that NBC's move would violate a caveat in the 2011 Comcast/NBCUniversal merger to commit to over-the-air broadcasting and public interest issues (the signal of the Merrimack, New Hampshire-based WNEU reaches only the northern half of the Boston market, with marginal coverage in the city proper).	
16	MyNetworkTV affiliate KRON-TV/San Francisco launches an hour-long newscast at 10:00 p.m. The program (which resulted in the station reducing its half-hour 11:00 p.m. newscast to 15 minutes and moving MyNetworkTV's second hour of programming to late night) competes with those aired in that hour on fellow Bay Area stations KTVU/Oakland (Fox) and KBCW (The CW, the latter is produced by CBS O&O sister KPIX). KRON had previously attempted a 10:00 p.m. newscast when it experimented with timeshifting network prime time programs and its late news one hour early in August 1992 as an NBC affiliate, only to resume airing them in the traditional 8:00–11:35 p.m. (Pacific Time) slot in September 1993 due to declining ratings (with its late news ratings falling behind KTVU's long-dominant prime time newscast).	
20	Due to technical issues, a Whitney Houston hologram that was going to perform with Christina Aguilera on The Voice for the tenth-season finale the following Tuesday was axed. Aguilera's finalist, Alisan Porter was declared the season's winner, allowing Aguilera to become the first female winning coach in the show's history. This is also the first season since season two (and the first season overall since the live-show format for eliminations were revamped starting season three) to have all four coaches representing one artist in the finale.	
22	The Weeknd and Adele are among the notable winners at the 2016 Billboard Music Awards. The ceremony (which also featured Adele's music video premiere for "Send My Love (To Your New Lover)", Madonna's special tribute performance to Prince (who died on April 21) and Britney Spears and Celine Dion being honored as Millennium Award and Icon Award recipients, respectively) broadcasts live on ABC in all time zones for the first time (following the same practice done by CBS' 58th Grammy Awards in February), and sets a record of 3.1 rating and 9.60 million in total viewers, the lowest for the awards ceremony since the 2012 telecast.	
23	After months of stalled negotiations between the company and network co-parent CBS Corporation concerning financial terms (specifically the amount of reverse compensation that the network sought from the group's stations in exchange for carrying its programming), Tribune Media reaches a new affiliation agreement with The CW through the 2020–21 season, involving 12 of its stations (including WPIX/New York City and KTLA/Los Angeles). The company's Chicago flagship WGN-TV is exempt from the deal, and instead becomes an independent station – with the CW affiliation moving to MyNetworkTV O&O WPWR-TV – after the network's initial ten-year agreement with Tribune (signed in January 2006) expires on September 1 (details are outlined further in that date's entry).	
24	Nyle DiMarco is crowned the 22nd season winner of Dancing with the Stars, becoming the first deaf contestant to win the show.	
25	Ron Howes, a chief meteorologist at WTVF/Nashville, Tennessee, retires after 36 years on the air.	
25	Wheel of Fortune saw its third-ever tie-breaking game after two contestants, LaToya Williams and Danielle Gilseth, were each tied with $24,000, with the other two occurrences being March 13, 2003, and March 2, 2006. The winning contestant, Williams, would later go on to win the $100,000 grand prize in the bonus round.	
27	Nexstar Broadcasting Group announces the sale of five television stations, including one it is divesting to comply with ownership conflicts with Media General-owned stations prior to receiving FCC approval of its merger with that group. Nexstar plans to sell CW affiliate WCWJ/Jacksonville, Florida, and NBC affiliate WSLS/Roanoke-Lynchburg, Virginia, to Graham Media Group for $120 million (with the former's sale creating a duopoly – Graham's first – with independent station WJXT pending approval, and the latter alleviating a conflict with the Nexstar-owned duopoly of Fox affiliate WFXR and CW affiliate WWCW); Fox affiliate KADN-TV and NBC affiliate KLAF-LD to Bayou City Broadcasting for $40 million (to alleviate a conflict with Media General-owned CBS affiliate KLFY-TV); and CBS affiliate KREG-TV/Glenwood Springs, Colorado, to Marquee Broadcasting for $350,000 (KREG, which is considered part of the Denver DMA, is expected to cease operating as a satellite of KREX-TV/Grand Junction upon consummation of the sale).	
27	In celebration of its 100th original television movie Adventures in Babysitting, Disney Channel celebrates the milestone by airing all 99 of the network's previous original movies released between 1997 and 2015 in the lead-up to the June 24 premiere of the made-for-TV remake of the 1987 feature film, starting with a four-day marathon of 51 of the channel's most popular original movies over the Memorial Day long weekend, followed by airings of these and the remaining 48 films afterwards and through the month of June.	
27	In interviews with The Cincinnati Enquirer and WVXU, talk show host Bill Cunningham announces he will end his self-titled daytime TV talk show, produced by Tribune Media and ITV Studios America and airing on The CW, after five seasons to focus solely on his local radio show for WLW/Cincinnati and family matters. The CW will fill the void Cunningham leaves behind by adding a new talk show hosted by Robert Irvine that will debut in September.	
29	With tickets for the race sold out, the local TV blackout is lifted for the Indianapolis 500. It's the first time since 1950, and the first time since ABC began live "flag-to-flag" coverage of the event in 1986, that the race airs live in central Indiana. WRTV/Indianapolis carries the ABC broadcast live after airing it only on tape-delay in previous years.	

=== June ===
Date	Event	Source
1	Trinity Broadcasting Network and the international congregation Hillsong Church launch Hillsong Channel, a joint venture channel in line with the Sydney, Australia-based Hillsong's American expansion plans (the network launches by coincidence one day after the death of TBN co-founder Jan Crouch). Hillsong replaces The Church Channel, which launched in January 2002 and focused on church services and other evangelistic programming; its replacement by Hillsong makes the new channel available over-the-air on the second subchannels of TBN's O&Os, as well as on select cable and satellite providers.	
1	WTGS/Savannah, Georgia, assumes production responsibilities for its nightly 10:00 p.m. newscast. The transfer of news operations in-house by the Fox-affiliated WTGS follows the May 31 termination of a news share agreement with Hearst Television-owned WJCL, under which the ABC affiliate had been producing a prime time newscast for WTGS since 1996 (WTGS was co-managed with WJCL under a concurrent shared services agreement from 1993 until 2014, when, to alleviate a conflict with its existing ownership of NBC affiliate WSAV-TV that was created by the group's merger with LIN Media, Media General sold WJCL to Hearst and the non-license assets of WTGS to Sinclair Broadcast Group, which later acquired the latter's license outright).	
3	Gray Television announces its intent to purchase WBAY-TV/Green Bay, Wisconsin (ABC) and NBC affiliate KWQC-TV/Davenport, Iowa, from Media General for $270 million. The deal is expected to be completed concurrently with the closing of the Media General/Nexstar Broadcasting Group merger. The divestitures of WBAY and KWQC will allow Nexstar to comply with FCC ownership rules in advance of the deal's approval proceedings (Nexstar already owns and operates stations in both markets, including CBS-affiliated WFRV-TV/Green Bay and WHBF-TV/Davenport).	
5	In a segment for HBO's Last Week Tonight about the debt-buying industry, especially "zombie debt" (debt long thought to be settled and buried but comes back to life for collection), host John Oliver announces what is termed as the biggest giveaway in TV history: Oliver reveals he set up an organization called "Central Asset Recovery Professionals" (aka CARP), which purchased, for $60,000, under $15 million in medical debt owed by 9,000 debtors, information on which CARP forwards to a debt-forgiving agency. Oliver's debt giveaway surpasses Oprah Winfrey's $8 million automobile giveaway in a 2004 episode of her talk show.	
6	Wheel of Fortune introduced crossword puzzles during the season finale week with a provided clue and interlocking words as part of the puzzle. This marks the first time words and answers are presented in vertical format.	
10	Fox Sports Networks dismisses reporter Emily Austen after she makes questionable comments about ethnic groups in a podcast for Barstool Sports. Austen had worked on a per-event basis for Fox's Florida-based regional networks, Fox Sports Florida and Fox Sports Sun, including serving as a sideline reporter for Tampa Bay Rays and Orlando Magic broadcasts.	
12	42 stations owned and/or operated by Tribune Broadcasting in 34 states, as well as WGN America, are removed from Dish Network due to a carriage dispute pertaining to a proposal in which Tribune wanted the satellite provider to increase the amount of retransmission revenue shared with the group. In response, Dish Network offers free over-the-air antennas to affected customers.	
12	Showtime airs the series finale of House of Lies, the first American scripted television series episode shot in Cuba since the restoration of diplomatic relations between the two countries.	
12	In the wake of a mass shooting at an Orlando nightclub that left 50 people dead and 53 wounded, the deadliest mass shooting in U.S. history, TNT pulls the third-season premiere of The Last Ship from the schedule due to a similar story line involving an explosion at a nightclub. The episode was rescheduled to premiere the following Sunday.	
13	USA Television MidAmerica Holdings (a joint venture between Heartland Media and MSouth Equity Partners) announces its intent to purchase five small-market stations being spun off by Nexstar Broadcasting Group and Media General for $115 million. USA Television will acquire Fox affiliate WFFT/Fort Wayne, Indiana, and ABC affiliate KQTV/St. Joseph, Missouri, from Nexstar, and CBS affiliates KIMT/Rochester, Minnesota, WTHI/Terre Haute and WLFI/Lafayette, Indiana, from Media General. The divestitures will allow Nexstar to comply with FCC ownership rules (specifically pertaining to national market coverage for station owners) in advance of the approval proceedings of the merger of both groups (Nexstar already owns NBC affiliate WTWO and operates ABC affiliate WAWV-TV in Terre Haute, and plans to acquire Media General-owned CBS affiliate WANE-TV in Fort Wayne).	
19	The 2016 NBA Finals, which saw the Cleveland Cavaliers win their first championship ever (ending a 52-year drought for Cleveland sports teams) after defeating the previous champions (as well as a rematch from 2015 Finals) the Golden State Warriors with a 93–89 victory at Oracle Arena in Oakland, posted its largest ratings ever, as Game 7 scored a massive 30.8 million viewers, which follows the record-breaking 18.9 rating among metered market households that arrived earlier on Monday and stands as the biggest showing ABC has ever had for an NBA game since the network started broadcasting the league back in 2003. It also breaks a record among highly rated NBA Finals telecasts, which was previously held by a match between the Chicago Bulls (in what would become the final game Michael Jordan would play with the team) and the Utah Jazz in 1998.	
26	Adult Swim launches the first television episode on Vine, the pilot episode of Brad Neely's Harg Nallin' Sclopio Peepio.	
27	The FCC makes minor changes to its media cross-ownership rules, specifically those pertaining to radio and television stations. While the outlined rules retain existing limits allowing ownership of two television stations (in addition to restoring rules on joint sales agreements overturned by the Third Circuit Court of Appeals on May 25) and continued prohibition on ownership of a newspaper and a radio and/or a television station in a single market (with a possible exception that would call for relaxations of the rule that would provide exemptions for failing properties under waivers), the proposed rules now prohibit a broadcaster or owner of two network affiliates that rank among the four highest-rated stations within one market from changing a station's primary network affiliation as a way to circumvent the ban, although this rule does not apply to dual affiliations that a station may offer via digital multicasting.	
29	NBC affiliate WRAL-TV/Raleigh-Durham, North Carolina, becomes the first television station to launch a full-time commercial ATSC 3.0 digital signal, under an FCC-issued experimental license. The Capitol Broadcasting Company flagship station – which had launched the first digital television signal in the U.S. in 1996, using the current ATSC 1.0 standard – signs on the feed with an HD simulcast of its noon newscast and a 4K ultra-high-definition broadcast of the documentary, Take Me Out to the Bulls Game. Initially having only a small signal range of the area around the station's studio facility, WRAL plans to conduct public tests and measurement of the 3.0 signal throughout the market in 2017.	
30	Lionsgate announces it will acquire Starz Inc. and its suite of premium entertainment networks (Starz, Starz Encore and MoviePlex) in a $4.4 billion cash and stock deal. Barring a divestiture of Lionsgate's interest in the latter service, the acquisition – which is expected to close by the end of 2016 – will add three additional premium services to the studio's portfolio, as it already owns a 30% stake in Epix as part of a joint venture with Viacom (through Paramount Pictures) and Metro-Goldwyn-Mayer.	
30	The Walt Disney Company reportedly reaches a deal with Major League Baseball to acquire a 33-percent stake in its interactive media unit, valued at $3.5 billion, with an option to obtain an additional 33-percent stake in the next four years. Bloomberg speculates Disney could use the service to create an attractive online-streaming model for its ESPN sports properties.	
30	Ramar Communications Inc. announces its intent to purchase Fox affiliate KASA-TV/Santa Fe/Albuquerque from Media General for $2.5 million. KASA's sale to Ramar, which will create a quadropoly with 3 other Ramar-owned low-power stations in the market (Telemundo affiliate KTEL-CD, Movies! affiliate KUPT-LD and MeTV affiliate KRTN-LD), is expected to be completed concurrently with the closing of the Media General/Nexstar Broadcasting Group merger (Nexstar plans to acquire CBS affiliate KRQE from Media General, and the company plans to operate CW affiliate KWBQ and MyNetwork TV affiliate KASY owned by Tamer Media). It will also lead to the likely migration of Fox programming to a KRQE subchannel, with Telemundo programming moving to KASA.	

=== July ===
Date	Event	Source
4	NBC broadcasts the 40th anniversary of Macy's 4th of July Fireworks Spectacular. The year's edition – hosted by Today and MSNBC's Tamron Hall and Willie Geist – featured a 25-minute fireworks display over the East River in New York City and performances by Meghan Trainor, Kenny Chesney, Pitbull, 5 Seconds of Summer, Sara Bareilles, DNCE and Jennifer Holliday (the latter of whom performed a recorded version of "America the Beautiful" with the United States Air Force Band, which was played during the fireworks display). Traditionally held every Fourth of July since 1976, the Macy's fireworks show was first televised on WPIX/New York City and in syndication in 1991 before moving to NBC for its national broadcast in 2000.	
5	PBS issues an apology after airing old footage of Washington, D.C., fireworks display during its live broadcast of A Capitol Fourth. In a statement, PBS stated that the show decided to intercut the footage of fireworks from its previous concerts due to an overcast weather condition in Washington, D.C., on Monday night (July 4), which caused several reactions from its viewers.	
6	Fox affiliate WLUK-TV/Green Bay, Wisconsin, announces a multi-year deal with ESPN for local over-the-air simulcast rights to the cable network's Monday Night Football broadcasts featuring the Green Bay Packers. WLUK's deal is noteworthy in that it leaves ABC affiliate WBAY-TV without scheduled Packers broadcasts for the 2016 NFL season. WBAY, the oldest TV station in the Green Bay/Fox Cities market, had carried at least one Packer game each season (either through its affiliations with CBS or ABC, its former simulcast deal with ESPN, or through local pre-season broadcasts) since it signed on in 1953.	
11	Just moments before KPNX/Phoenix reporter Joe Dana wraps up a story, his cameraman catches a 60-year-old man slapping a woman in a wheelchair on air. The live shot, and its resulting viral status, sparks outrage from viewers, resulting in the man's immediate arrest minutes after viewers call the police.	
21	21st Century Fox announces that Roger Ailes has resigned as chairman and chief executive of Fox News Networks, LLC (the parent division of Fox News and Fox Business) effective immediately, with Fox executive co-chairman Rupert Murdoch succeeding Ailes on an interim basis. Ailes, who had been with Fox News since its founding in 1996 and will transition into a non-corporate role as Murdoch's advisor, has been facing several accusations of sexual harassment and gender discrimination, notably from former FNC personality Gretchen Carlson, who filed a lawsuit against Ailes on June 30 following the announcement that her contract with the channel was not renewed. Fox later settled with Carlson for $20 million.	
21	Citing "difficulty acquiring parts," Japanese electronics manufacturer Funai announces it will discontinue production of VHS video cassette recorders at the end of July. Funai is believed to be the last-known company still manufacturing VCR technology.	
24	CNN suspends the contract of analyst Donna Brazile after she is named interim chief of the Democratic National Committee, a role she'll oversee until after the end of the 2016 elections (Brazile is also the DNC's vice-president); she later resigned on October 16. The move comes as Congresswoman Debbie Wasserman-Schultz (D-Florida's 23rd) steps down as DNC chair (one day before the start of the 2016 Democratic National Convention in Philadelphia) in the wake of a series of leaked DNC e-mails involving staffers making negative remarks toward Bernie Sanders during his challenge against Hillary Clinton in the 2016 Democratic presidential primaries.	
28	A major change takes place on Sesame Street when producers of the Sesame Workshop-produced HBO/PBS children's program announce that longtime cast members Bob McGrath (Bob Johnson), Roscoe Orman (Gordon Robinson) and Emilio Delgado (Luis Rodriguez), all of whom had been on the show for over 40 years, would not return as a result of a retooling of the show for its upcoming 47th season (McGrath is the longest tenured of the three, having starred on Sesame Street since its series premiere in 1969).	

=== August ===
Date	Event	Source
1	On the 35th anniversary of the original MTV's launch, parent company Viacom rebrands VH1 Classic as MTV Classic, which will exclusively air music videos, as MTV had until the early 1990s. It is the third rebranding of a Viacom Media Networks music channel in 2016 (CMT Pure Country became CMT Music on January 4, while Palladia became MTV Live on February 1), and is the last of the group's VH1-branded digital networks to be transferred under the brand of one of its sister networks (VH1 Soul was rebranded as BET Soul in December 2015). The first program on MTV Classic is an archived recording of MTV's first hour of programming from this date in 1981, which also aired on its 30th anniversary in 2011.	
1	Quincy Media shuffles network affiliations in four Midwestern markets. As part of a restructuring resulting from FCC ownership restrictions cited in relation to its 2015 purchase of several Granite Broadcasting stations, ABC affiliate WPTA-TV assumes the NBC affiliation for Fort Wayne, Indiana, for its second subchannel (MyNetworkTV was moved to WPTA-DT3), while longtime NBC station WISE-TV (owned by SagamoreHill Broadcasting) takes the CW affiliation formerly held by WPTA-DT2 for its main channel;in Duluth, Minnesota, NBC station KBJR-TV also adds a subchannel-only affiliation with CBS, taking over for SagamoreHill-owned KDLH, which assumes KBJR-DT2's former CW affiliation (the MyNetworkTV affiliation remains on KBJR-DT3). Through an unrelated agreement with Sinclair Broadcast Group announced on July 27, the Fox affiliation in South Bend, Indiana, moves to the existing second subchannel of Sinclair's CBS affiliate WSBT-TV, resulting in WSJV/Elkhart shuttering its news department and reducing its staff to an FCC-minimum two-person skeleton crew, with only a few staffers from WSJV being retained for the new Fox operation. After a 60-day transition period, WSJV will move its Heroes & Icons affiliation to its main channel while awaiting a rumored dissolution in the FCC spectrum auction. In exchange for the South Bend Fox affiliation, Quincy acquires the ABC and CW affiliations associated with Sinclair's WHOI/Peoria, Illinois, creating a duopoly with NBC affiliate WEEK-TV, with WHOI's ABC and CW affiliations moving to WEEK's second and third subchannels, respectively.	
5–21	The 2016 Summer Olympics – which were held in Rio de Janeiro, Brazil – airs on NBC, Telemundo and seven of their sister cable networks (NBCSN, CNBC, MSNBC, Bravo, Golf Channel, NBC Universo and USA Network), with a combined 6,700 hours of live coverage being broadcast across the NBCUniversal-owned linear networks, two dedicated basketball- and soccer-only channels and NBC Sports' streaming platforms. Outside of the opening and closing ceremonies, which aired on a one-hour delay, and a limited selection of high-profile events (such as gymnastics), this marked the first Olympics since 1996 in which NBC aired most events live in the Continental United States (Rio is located in the UTC-03:00 time offset – corresponding to the North American Atlantic Time Zone – during the Southern Hemisphere winter). As it had to some extent for the 2016 games, the network has faced criticism in recent years for tape delaying many high-profile Olympic events to prime time to accrue higher viewership for the telecasts, as well as for delaying the opening and closing ceremonies for editorial reasons, as coverage of post-event results has become widely available online through news and social media outlets. The Olympics also become the first sports telecast to provide a live Descriptive Video Service audio track for the blind, with NBC offering real-time descriptions for its prime time event coverage (the first program to feature real-time DVS audio was NBC's November 2015 telecast of The Wiz Live).	
6	With one final assignment on this date (the network's coverage of the Pro Football Hall of Fame induction ceremony), Tom Jackson retires after a 29-year career as an NFL studio analyst for ESPN.	
6	Hulu shifts to a subscription-only model, placing the content featured on its main website behind a pay wall. The streaming service's free content – which notably includes the "rolling five" recent episodes of various broadcast and cable series – moves to Yahoo! View, a new service launched as part of an expansion of an existing partnership between Hulu and Yahoo!.	
12	Thomas Gibson is dismissed from the cast of Criminal Minds. The firing of Gibson, who had played Aaron Hotchner on the CBS crime drama since its September 2005 premiere, comes after his involvement in an on-set argument with series writer/co-executive producer Virgil Williams over an episode storyline, which led to Gibson physically assaulting Williams by kicking the writer in the shin.	
13–14	Two television news crews in Milwaukee are involved in incidents during riots stemming from a fatal shooting of an armed African-American suspect by police: on the 13th, a crew from CBS affiliate WDJT-TV is attacked by a group of protesters and their equipment is stolen while reporting from the location of a burned-out gas station set afire during the protests. On the 14th, a crew from ABC affiliate WISN-TV is forced to retreat from the area after protesters throw rocks and other objects at the station's vehicle.	
17	The News-Press & Gazette Company announces that it will switch the primary affiliation of CW Plus affiliate KBJO-LD in St. Joseph, Missouri, to NBC sometime in the fall (later confirmed to be November 1), with the KNPG-LD call letters assigned to its Telemundo-affiliated sister station on UHF channel 30 being transferred to KBJO's channel 21 license at that time (KBJO's existing CW affiliation will move to a new DT2 subchannel). This will give the St. Joseph market its first locally based NBC affiliate (the network has been available locally through its affiliates from the adjacent Kansas City market, WDAF-TV until that station's September 1994 switch to Fox and KSHB-TV afterward) and its fourth locally based major network affiliate (News-Press & Gazette also owns Fox affiliate KNPN-LD, which signed on alongside KBJO-LD in July 2012 as competitors to Nexstar-owned ABC affiliate KQTV). It will also leave CBS and MyNetworkTV as the only networks available in St. Joseph through Kansas City-based stations (their respective affiliates for that market, KCTV and KSMO-TV, are viewable over-the-air and carried on Suddenlink, DirecTV and Dish Network in St. Joseph).	
21	Coinciding with the closing ceremony of the 2016 Summer Olympics in Rio de Janeiro, the Olympic Channel, an over-the-top digital platform service of the International Olympic Committee, launches. The service – which aims to maintain year-round interest in Olympic sports between iterations of the Summer and Winter Olympics, especially among a younger audience – features coverage of competitions in Olympic sport, as well as short and long-form content focusing on Olympic athletes.	
22	Major changes take place on NBC's morning news/talk show Today, with former Access Hollywood host Billy Bush becoming the new anchor of its third-hour segment Today's Take, succeeding Willie Geist (who will continue to anchor Sunday Today with Willie Geist and on MSNBC's Morning Joe), and Natalie Morales moving to Los Angeles to become its West Coast anchor, as well as a host of KNBC-produced syndicated entertainment news program and its spinoff, Access Hollywood Live. In addition, the program announces that it will not have a separate news anchor following Morales' West Coast transition, and instead, anchors Matt Lauer and Savannah Guthrie read the headlines during the program's first two hours, marking the second time that the program without having a separate news anchor since Tom Brokaw and Jane Pauley held that position from 1979 to 1981.	

=== September ===
Date	Event	Source
1	The CW affiliation in Chicago moves from Tribune Media flagship station WGN-TV, which becomes an independent station, to Fox-owned MyNetworkTV O&O WPWR-TV (which retains the latter network's schedule as a late-night offering). The switch – which ends WGN's 21-year tenure as a network affiliate (it became a WB affiliate in January 1995, then joined The CW in September 2006, which were at the respective formations) – will allow the station to carry additional sports telecasts it produces through its local broadcast contracts with the Chicago Cubs (MLB), White Sox (MLB), Bulls (NBA) and Blackhawks (NHL) that it previously had to lease to WPWR (and WCIU-TV beforehand) due to network-imposed annual preemption limits. The CW's move to WPWR – announced concurrently with the May 23 renewal of an affiliation agreement involving Tribune's 12 other CW-affiliated stations – marks the first time that Fox has aligned one of its stations with the network under a long-term deal (as The CW initially chose to affiliate with most of Tribune and CBS's WB and UPN stations, instead of Fox's UPN affiliates) and the second time it has operated a CW affiliate (to fulfill an existing contract, Fox ran WJZY/Belmont-Charlotte, North Carolina, as a CW station for three months after completing its purchase of the station before converting it into a Fox O&O in July 2013). WPWR also becomes the largest station by market size to maintain a dual CW/MyNetworkTV affiliation.	
5	Doug Llewelyn returns to The People's Court as the host and litigant interviewer, a role he had previously maintained for the entirety of the first run of the series, during Judge Wapner's tenure (1981–1993).	
6	After 14 years, Greta Van Susteren announces that she is stepping down as host of On the Record and leaving Fox News effective immediately to pursue other opportunities, taking advantage of her contract clause that allowed her to leave the network if she chooses, later explaining that she felt her tenure and the environment at the network there was "unhappy." Fox News senior political analyst Brit Hume is tapped as On the Record's interim host for the rest of the 2016 election cycle.	
7	In a 3–2 vote, the FCC formally abolishes an ownership percentage discount it had applied to television stations on the UHF band (channels 14 and upward) which had become outmoded after the digital transition, when the vast majority of stations moved to the UHF band. The discount, which was implemented in 1985 at a time UHF stations were stigmatized before cable television stunted the band's former disadvantages, applied 50% of a UHF station's market reach to the station owner's nationwide household cap (which currently resides at 39%). Station groups that maintained a combined market reach totaling over the national cap (such as Tribune Broadcasting, Ion Media Networks and Univision Communications) prior to the initial 2013 rulemaking proposal will not be forced to sell stations as a result of the discount's elimination, though they will need to conform to the cap in future transactions. The abolishment of the UHF discount has been panned by groups such as Sinclair Broadcast Group and Fox Television Stations, since the national cap would not concurrently be raised nor would a reversed "VHF discount" in the digital age (VHF stations are more prone to digital interference) be applied to account for competition in the broadcasting marketplace, restricting them from acquiring additional stations.	
7	With the USS Intrepid (CV-11) in New York City as a backdrop, NBC and MSNBC air the Commander-in-Chief Forum. The Q&A event, sponsored by the Iraq and Afghanistan Veterans of America, featured the respective Democratic and Republican candidates, Hillary Clinton and Donald Trump, fielding questions from moderator Matt Lauer and active, reserve and retired members of the military in separate half-hour segments. The event draws 15 million viewers but also wide criticism – from the media, viewers and NBC executives – over Lauer's performance, which was seen as too rushed and biased, especially towards Clinton during the first half (a narrow focus on her controversial use of a private e-mail server, constraining time for questions on her national security proposals), while being too soft and easy on Trump in the second half (with Lauer primarily focusing on Trump's controversial statements about veterans and not disputing Trump's claim that he never supported the Iraq War).	
9	Viacom Media Networks completes the cycle of rebranding their smaller cable networks, replacing MTV Hits and moving it under the editorial control of Nickelodeon under the new name NickMusic. The network will retain the contemporary hit format originated by MTV Hits, with its music video content being re-targeted towards children ages 2–14 (complementing the radio network it operates in partnership with iHeartMedia, Nick Radio).	
10	MSG Western New York launches with a prime time cut in. The new regional sports network, a joint venture between MSG and Pegula Sports and Entertainment, carries the Buffalo Sabres broadcasts that had been on MSG, as well as the midday Instigators (formerly Hockey Hotline) daily Sabres talk show and the Buffalo Bills' existing in-house radio and television products that had aired on WGR (where those broadcasts will continue to air on radio) and WKBW-TV.	
12	During Dancing with the Stars' 23rd season premiere, swimmer and contestant Ryan Lochte is attacked by two audience members after his first performance with dancing partner Cheryl Burke. Lochte and Burke are unharmed, and security rushes the attackers off-camera while host Tom Bergeron forces a commercial break. The attack comes amid a series of backlashes for Lochte, who was suspended by USA Swimming for 10 months after falsely telling authorities in Rio de Janeiro that he was robbed at gunpoint while competing at the 2016 Summer Olympics.	
17	Fox College Football begins a series of game broadcasts available in virtual reality with a game between Ohio State and Oklahoma. The broadcasts are made through a smartphone app that requires a stereoscope and TV Everywhere authentication.	
18	The 68th Primetime Emmy Awards air on ABC, with Jimmy Kimmel as host. The ceremony includes 5 awards, including outstanding limited series, for The People v. O. J. Simpson: American Crime Story (the night's award leader); repeat wins for Game of Thrones and Veep as outstanding drama and comedy series, respectively; and first-time wins for actors Rami Malek (lead drama actor, for Mr. Robot) and Tatiana Maslany (lead drama actress, for Orphan Black).	
20	The Time Warner Cable News networks are rebranded as Spectrum News, after the primary consumer brand of Charter Communications, following their purchase of Time Warner Cable four months ago. NY1 rebranded as "Spectrum News NY1" on November 15.	
22	With its 13th season premiere episode "Undo", Grey's Anatomy surpasses NYPD Blue as ABC's longest-running one-hour primetime dramatic series. The Shonda Rimes-produced medical drama debuted on ABC in March 2005.	
25	Charles Osgood hosts CBS News Sunday Morning for the final time, retiring from TV broadcasting after 49 years, 45 of them as a reporter and anchor with CBS News and 22 as Sunday Morning host. Osgood will remain with CBS as a radio commentator for The Osgood File. Jane Pauley will take over for Osgood as Sunday Morning host on October 9, becoming only the 3rd host in the show's history after Osgood and Charles Kuralt.	
26	Hofstra University in Hempstead, New York, hosts the first of three Presidential debates between major party candidates Hillary Clinton and Donald Trump. The scheduling of this debate and one set for October 9 at Washington University in St. Louis raised the ire of the campaign for Republican nominee Trump, which worried their scheduling opposite primetime NFL games would drive down debate viewership (Trump claimed the campaign of Democratic nominee Clinton influenced the schedule). Despite the Trump camp's worries, the non-partisan Commission on Presidential Debates, which is responsible for debate scheduling (and set the dates one year in advance), holds firm on its schedule, and this date's debate attracts an estimated record of 84 million viewers across 13 networks, surpassing the 81 million who watched a Jimmy Carter/Ronald Reagan debate in 1980.	
28	Modern Family makes history with the episode "A Stereotypical Day," which introduced for the first time ever the youngest transgender child to be featured on a television series. Jackson Millarker, a real life transgender child actor (at age 8), is cast as Lily's transgender friend Tom in this breakthrough episode.	

=== October ===
Date	Event	Source
2	Two broadcasting legends end their long careers: Los Angeles Dodgers announcer Vin Scully retires from broadcasting after a record 67 years with the team, while Dick Enberg ends a seven-year run as television voice of the San Diego Padres, and a 60-year career on national TV. Both Scully and Enberg were also known for national TV work for CBS Sports and NBC Sports.	
4	Elaine Quijano of CBS News moderates the 2016 Vice Presidential debate between Indiana Governor Mike Pence and Virginia Senator Tim Kaine at Longwood University.	
7	The Washington Post releases raw footage from a 2005 Access Hollywood segment in which then-Apprentice host and future Republican presidential nominee Donald Trump, in a hot mic conversation with Access Hollywood co-host Billy Bush, makes lewd comments about women, including Trump's implying that his celebrity allowed him parlance to make unwanted sexual advances toward women. The video's release creates an immediate uproar, with several of Trump's fellow Republicans renouncing their support for him or calling him to withdraw from the campaign, a move Trump vows not to do. The fallout also affects others mentioned in or appearing on the tape: Both Entertainment Tonight co-host Nancy O'Dell (who co-hosted Access Hollywood with Bush at the time and whom Trump admitted to seducing) and Days of Our Lives actress Arianne Zucker issue statements about their vow to rise above a distrustful Trump, while Bush would be suspended by NBC from his position as Today's third hour co-host on October 9, a move that would lead to a formal separation on October 17.	
8	NBC partners with Litton Entertainment to expand The More You Know into a three-hour Saturday morning E/I block aimed at 13 to 16-year-olds, giving Litton editorial control of four of the five educational children's blocks for the major commercial networks. Extended early second day 2016 Ryder Cup coverage postponed the block's original full rollout on October 1, with all but two of the programs featured on the block being pre-empted on the originally scheduled launch date on most NBC affiliates.	
9	Martha Raddatz of ABC News and CNN's Anderson Cooper moderate the second Presidential debate at Washington University in St. Louis.	
10–14	In celebration of CBS Daytime's 30th year of dominance in the ratings (one of the longest winning streaks in television history), CBS celebrates the milestone by making special appearances by the cast of the network's programs (Let's Make a Deal, The Price Is Right, The Young and the Restless, The Bold and the Beautiful and The Talk) on each other's shows. In addition, the network announces that it will also unveil a special exhibit, titled "CBS Daytime #1 For 30 Years" (running from October 12 to November 27) at the Paley Center for Media in Beverly Hills, California, honoring its five current shows, as well as legacy programs (including former soap operas As the World Turns and Guiding Light), and a planned four-week consecutive special panels, featuring the stars and producers from the network's daytime lineup.	
13	With the 12th-season premiere episode "Keep Calm and Carry On", Supernatural becomes the first series to reach a record 12 seasons on The CW. The show is the last remaining CW series that carried over from predecessor networks UPN or The WB, debuting on the latter network in September 2005.	
13	After a twelve-year run, Nancy Grace ends her self-titled program on HLN to pursue newer media ventures.	
16	Fox's The Simpsons reaches the 600-episode plateau with its 27th Treehouse of Horror episode, a Halloween tradition that dates back to the series' 2nd season in 1990. The Simpsons is the longest-running scripted primetime series in U.S. television history by number of seasons (28); in April 2019, it would become the longest-running by number of episodes (surpassing Gunsmoke's 635-episode run).	
19	Chris Wallace moderates the final 2016 Presidential debate at the University of Nevada, Las Vegas.	
22	Telecom giant AT&T confirms its plan to buy Time Warner in an $85.4 billion merger that, if approved by federal regulators, would bring the HBO and Cinemax suites, the Turner Broadcasting networks, and the Warner Bros. studio under the same umbrella as AT&T's telecommunication holdings, which already includes DirecTV, the Root Sports networks, cable channel Audience, and shares of Game Show Network and MLB Network.	
22	The Chicago Cubs win the National League pennant against the Los Angeles Dodgers. It was the team's first pennant and World Series appearance since 1945. Coincidentally, this marked the end of the Curse of the Billy Goat as the team clinched on the day Billy Sianis died 46 years ago.	
24	Univision O&O KDTV-DT moves its studios from 50 Fremont Center (today Salesforce West) in San Francisco's Financial District to a new state-of-the-art building in San Jose, becoming the third television station in the Bay Area market to be based from that city after NBC O&O KNTV and their sister station, Telemundo's KSTS. The station also switches its newscasts in high definition, beginning with the relaunch of its morning newscast "Al Despertar" as Despierta Área de la Bahía.	
25	Coinciding with the start of the 2016–17 NBA regular season, NBA Team Pass, a spin-off of the NBA League Pass out-of-market sports package, launches. The service, which will initially be available to Dish Network subscribers for a monthly fee, is an unbundled version of its parent package – which carries games from all 30 NBA teams across multiple channels – that allows subscribers to watch games from individual league teams of their choice throughout the regular season. The launch follows the NBA's July announcement that it would begin selling NBA League Pass in a refined a la carte offering, and introduce a pay-per-view-style structure allowing subscribers to pay to watch a single game for a one-time fee of $6.99.	
26	Artistic Media Partners announces the sale of all four of its Lafayette, Indiana, radio stations (WBPE, WYCM, WAZY-FM and WSHY) to Lafayette TV, LLC. On the same day, the latter company (owned by business investors Bill Christian and Mike Reed) launch their new television station, WPBI-LD, which carries programming from Fox and NBC via digital multicasting. Prior to the launch, WXIN and WTHR/Indianapolis served as the default Fox and NBC affiliates for the Lafayette area, respectively. The launch of WPBI leaves ABC, The CW, and MyNetworkTV as the only three networks available in the Lafayette area through their stations in Indianapolis (Their respective affiliates for that market, WRTV, WISH-TV, and WNDY-TV, are receivable over-the-air and are also carried on Comcast, Dish Network, and DirecTV in the Lafayette market).	
28	In CBS, as part of the Big Money week in The Price is Right, Christen Freeman won $210,000 in the Pricing Game of Cliffhangers, plus $107 from the mini-prizes; including her $1,000 bonus in the Showcase Showdown and $2,770 Lenovo computer won in One Bid, Freeman's total of $213,876 surpassed Sheree Heil's $170,345 from December 30, 2013, episode as the all-time largest daytime winner in the show's history, a record she held until October 14, 2019, where Michael Stouber surpassed her total with $262,743.	
31	Participant Media shuts down Pivot, citing lack of viewership by millennials, its targeted demographic.	

=== November ===
Date	Event	Source
1	Beauty iQ, a spin-off home shopping network of QVC, launches. The network, which will initially be available in 40 million U.S. homes, is dedicated to cosmetics, fragrances and skincare products, offering live programming each Wednesday through Sunday in prime time and recorded segments for the remainder of its schedule.	
2	The Department of Justice files an antitrust lawsuit against DirecTV, alleging that it engaged in unlawful information-sharing with rival pay television providers regarding their resistance to carrying Spectrum SportsNet LA, a network operated as a joint venture between Time Warner Cable (now a Charter subsidiary) and the Los Angeles Dodgers.	
2	The 50th edition of the Country Music Association Awards airs on ABC, with Brad Paisley and Carrie Underwood returning as hosts. The event also saw country music artists Dolly Parton, Kenny Chesney and Garth Brooks being awarded as Lifetime Achievement Award, Pinnacle Award and Entertainer of the Year Award recipients, respectively, and a surprise duet between The Dixie Chicks and Beyoncé on the latter's "Daddy Lessons," which was met with critical praise from the audience and social media as the show's most highlighted performance.	
2	The Chicago Cubs break their 108-year championship drought with a 10-inning victory over the Cleveland Indians in Game 7 of the 2016 World Series. Fox's broadcast of the game attracts 40.045 million viewers, the largest national audience for a Major League Baseball game since Game 7 of the 1991 World Series.	
7	CBS' The Odd Couple dedicates an episode to Garry Marshall with an assembly of actors from Marshall-produced series Happy Days (Ron Howard, Marion Ross, Anson Williams and Don Most), Mork & Mindy (Pam Dawber), and Laverne & Shirley (Cindy Williams and Marshall's sister Penny). Garry Marshall produced the 1970–75 version of The Odd Couple and served as a consultant on the current version, where he once made a guest appearance as Oscar Madison's (Matthew Perry) father.	
7	With its titular character (played by Gina Rodriguez) no longer a virgin, The CW comedy-drama/telenovela spoof Jane the Virgin sees the series' title modified, with "The Virgin" crossed out in favor of substitutes.	
8	Former host of The Apprentice and TV personality Donald Trump is elected the 45th President in an upset victory over former Secretary of State Hillary Clinton in the 2016 United States presidential election.	
8	Northern Lights Media, a subsidiary of Gray Television, announces that it will purchase the Fairbanks, Alaska, triopoly of NBC affiliate KTVF, Fox affiliate KFXF-LD and CBS affiliate KXDD-CD (subsequently renamed KXDF-CD) from a joint venture of Chena Broadcasting and Tanana Valley Television Company for $8 million. Pending FCC and Justice Department approval, the transaction will expand Gray's presence in Alaska, as it already owns Anchorage NBC affiliate KTUU-TV (which it acquired through Gray's 2015 merger acquisition of Schurz Communications' television group) and MyNetworkTV affiliate KYES-TV (which it acquired through a separate deal with Fireweed Communications that was made while the Schurz transaction was ongoing).	
11	Donald Trump's former campaign manager Corey Lewandowski ends his controversial tenure as a political commentator at CNN.	
12	Dave Chappelle hosts Saturday Night Live, his first comedic TV appearance since abruptly leaving his sketch comedy show in 2005. The profane language that Chappelle used in a stand-up routine (centering partly on Donald Trump's election as president) in the episode's monologue and a violent and gory Walking Dead spoof sketch led NBC affiliate WRAL-TV/Raleigh to censor portions of the broadcast, resulting in viewer complaints across social media outlets who questioned whether the station was intentionally censoring the show or was experiencing technical problems with the NBC network feed. In an apology statement noting that it would review such procedures, WRAL vice president/general manager Steven D. Hammel confirmed that the station ducked profanities that did not comply with the station's longstanding internal obscenity policies (Chappelle used two of ten profanities barred under the policy a total of nine times).	
15	After 30 years of serving the Memphis market as a reporter and lead anchor, CBS affiliate WREG-TV's Claudia Barr announced that she is retiring from broadcasting at the end of the month. Barr, who began her career at WHBQ-TV, has been with WREG as its anchorwoman since 2006.	
20	Justin Bieber and Drake are among the notable winners at the 2016 American Music Awards. The ceremony, which was hosted by Gigi Hadid and Jay Pharoah and broadcast on ABC, also saw actor Robert Downey Jr. presenting the Award of Merit to rock singer Sting and Hadid imitating President-elect Donald Trump's wife Melania's controversial speech at the 2016 Republican National Convention in July, which resulted her to issue an apology on social networking site Twitter the next day after receiving negative reactions from its viewers.	
22	Just three months after winning gold medal with her Final Five teammates in gymnastics at the 2016 Summer Olympics in Rio de Janeiro, Laurie Hernandez is crowned the 23rd season winner of Dancing with the Stars, becoming the youngest contestant to win the show.	
24	The 90th edition of Macy's Thanksgiving Day Parade airs on NBC, with Today anchors Matt Lauer, Savannah Guthrie and Al Roker as hosts, and simulcast in Spanish on its sister network Telemundo, with hosts Jessica Carrillo and Carlos Ponce (marking the latter network's first Spanish-language broadcast of the parade since 2006). The parade (with its route taken place from 77th Street and Central Park West to Macy's flagship store in Herald Square at 34th Street) featured balloons (including Felix the Cat balloon's first appearance since the 1937 parade), floats, marching bands, as well as music and Broadway performances including the cast of NBC's upcoming live musical Hairspray Live!, Brett Eldredge, Sarah McLachlan, Aloe Blacc, Maddie and Tae, The Muppets, Daya, Kelsea Ballerini, Fitz and the Tantrums, The Rockettes, and Tony Bennett. Additionally, it also partnered with telecommunications company Verizon to air a 360-degree virtual reality live telecast of the parade, which was made available through Verizon's YouTube channel.	
30	MundoMax ceases operations and all affiliation contracts, resulting in dozens of employees in several departments being laid off (including administration, programming, promotions, research and sales in Los Angeles, New York and Miami). Launched in 2012 as MundoFox (a joint venture between Fox International Channels and RCN Televisión), the Spanish-language broadcast television network was plagued by dismal ratings (which had not been tabulated since Nielsen Media terminated their contract with the network at the end of September) and an affiliate base that was unable to acquire cable carriage due to their mainly low-power Class A status, disqualifying them from "must-carry" provisions. Several affiliates switch to Liberman Broadcasting-owned Estrella TV, with Azteca and other Spanish-language networks (although some would switch to English-language networks or became independent stations) as possibilities for new affiliations.	
30	AT&T launches DirecTV Now, an over-the-top subscription service featuring channels owned by AMC, Discovery, Disney, Fox, NBCUniversal, Viacom, Turner and Univisión. Soon after, numerous subscribers began reporting that the service experiences persistent freezing between 7:00 PM and 11:30 PM EST due to an unresolved issue (though its customer service indicated that the issue is being worked on, with no known repair date announced), leading to numerous customers filing complaints with the FCC. Additionally, it has generally received negative reviews, with most customers also noting the lack of on-demand programming.	

=== December ===
Date	Event	Source
1	WVNC-LD in Watertown, New York, signs on the air, giving the Watertown market, the last market in New York without full network service, not only its first full-time NBC affiliate, but also in-market affiliates of all four major commercial networks. WVNC-LD is also SagamoreHill Broadcasting's first television holding in the Northeast. In addition, plans are underway for WVNC-LD to commence a local news operation in early 2018, which would mark the first competition for dominant CBS affiliate WWNY-TV since ABC affiliate WWTI shut down its operation in 2009.	
5	Tegna Media's New Orleans CBS affiliate WWL-TV begins carrying CBS This Morning for the first time since the late 1980s, making it the last CBS station in the United States to clear the program. The 7:00–9:00 a.m. block of the station's local morning news program, Eyewitness Morning News, moves to its MyNetworkTV-affiliated sister station WUPL, which had been carrying CBS This Morning (and its predecessor The Early Show) since 2005.	
5	The 2016 Victoria's Secret Fashion Show is broadcast on CBS. 6.67 million people tune in.	
8	Citing the commute between the East and West coasts, and juggling her other television obligations (including her commitments on the Netflix sitcom Fuller House, which is filmed in Los Angeles) being difficult to her and her family, Candace Cameron Bure announces that she will leave The View after two seasons. Bure joins Raven-Symoné, who announced in October that she would be exiting the ABC daytime talk show at the end of 2016 to focus on a That's So Raven spin-off series. Her last day on the show was aired the following day.	
13	Cindy Stowell begins a championship run on Jeopardy!. Stowell died from colon cancer eight days before her first on-air appearance. Stowell, who taped her episodes in August (when she was suffering from a blood infection and was on painkillers), won six games and over $103,000 in winnings (enough to qualify for Jeopardy's Tournament of Champions had she survived). Stowell pledged her winnings to cancer research.	
15	Facebook announces that it is forming a partnership with ABC News and key fact-checking websites as part of an effort to crack down on the growing number of fake news stories. The move comes after the social media outlet proposed a new policy to restrict or flag stories that cannot be verified or no cited sources, in general stories that ran during the 2016 US presidential election, whose outcome major news media networks believe contributed to Donald Trump's win.	
19	After 23 years in both radio and television, WTMJ-TV-AM/Milwaukee host Charlie Sykes retires from broadcast media, and ends his locally based Sunday morning talk show Sunday Insight on WTMJ-TV. He will continue to manage his website RightWisconsin.com with WTMJ owner E. W. Scripps Company and occasionally contribute analysis for MSNBC.	
19	Married couple John and Angel Whorton win a total of $1,300,010 on the premiere episode of The Wall on NBC. This is the second time that a contestant or a team of contestants had won $1,000,000 or more on the first episode of an American game show; the previous instance happened in 2007, when a contestant won $1,000,000 on the first episode of Power of 10 on CBS.	
22	Light TV, a family-oriented digital television network created by Roma Downey's LightWorkers Media and owned by MGM Television and Digital (which is run by Downey's husband Mark Burnett), launches. Its charter affiliates will be digital subchannels of Fox stations owned by Fox Television Stations, which will serve as a partner in the joint venture, with the network drawing its programming from the respective television and film libraries of Fox and MGM.	
24	Citing producers' monetary payments to some participants for access, A&E announces it has cancelled plans to air a documentary series profiling those seeking to break away from the Ku Klux Klan. The series, titled Escaping the KKK (it was originally titled Generation KKK) and scheduled for a January 10, 2017, premiere, had been plagued by concerns that the show would glorify the all-white organization and its reactionary beliefs.	
31	Dick Clark's New Year's Rockin' Eve celebrates its 45th anniversary, featuring performances by Mariah Carey (marking her return after being its first live headliner in 2006), DNCE, Gloria Estefan and the cast of her Broadway musical On Your Feet!, and Thomas Rhett from New York City's Times Square, Demi Lovato from Sint Maarten, Lionel Richie from Las Vegas, and several others from the Billboard Hollywood Party in Los Angeles. It also features coverage of festivities from New Orleans with Lucy Hale as host, performances by Jason Derülo and Panic at the Disco from the Allstate Fan Fest (a concert event tying into the Sugar Bowl game), and Jackson Square's fleur-de-lis drop at midnight (Central Time), which marks the first time that the ABC annual program broadcast live coverage of New Year's festivities from a city in the Central Time Zone since the network's day-long telecast ABC 2000 Today in 1999. Carey's performance was plagued by technical glitches, prompting negative reactions on social media.	
31	Anderson Cooper and Kathy Griffin celebrate their tenth final year as hosts of New Year's Eve Live on CNN. The annual program (broadcast live from New York City's Times Square), which also saw Griffin wrapping Cooper in aluminium foil to celebrate their tenth anniversary together (tin/aluminium foil is the "traditional" 10th anniversary gift), as well as receiving well-wishes from numerous celebrities (including Sharon Stone, Dave Grohl, Josh Groban, Kristin Chenoweth, Ron Jeremy, Megan Mullally and Nick Offerman), and Don Lemon being drunk during his on-air segments (alongside Brooke Baldwin, who were covering festivities from New Orleans) and having one of his ears pierced on live television, delivers its viewership record (being the #1 cable program in total viewers for the hour and a half surrounding midnight, and second for the entire program duration, including the primetime segments), shared with Fox News's All American New Year. Its international simulcast on sister network CNN International was significantly cut back due to the breaking news coverage of the nightclub attack in Istanbul, Turkey before CNNI later joining the program at the 11:00 p.m. (Eastern Time) junction. (Griffin would be dismissed from the position in 2017.)	

=== Unknown (dates) ===
Date	Event	Source
N/A	Jungo TV was launched as a private joint venture media and entertainment company that offers foreign film and television contents across the globe through pay television providers and OTT platforms, as well as partnerships with other third-party media companies. It was founded by a celebrity surgeon and television personality Dr. Mehmet Oz, NJK Holding chairman Nasser J. Kazeminy, Entertainment Media Ventures CEO Sandy Climan, and George Chung.	

== Awards ==
Category/Organization	7th Critics' Choice Television Awards December 11, 2016	74th Golden Globe Awards January 8, 2017	Producers Guild and Screen Actors Guild Awards January 28–29, 2017	69th Primetime Emmy Awards September 17, 2017
Best Drama Series	Game of Thrones	The Crown	Stranger Things	The Handmaid's Tale
Best Comedy Series	Silicon Valley	Atlanta		Veep
Best Limited Series	The People v. O. J. Simpson: American Crime Story			Big Little Lies
Best Actor in a Drama Series	Bob Odenkirk; Better Call Saul	Billy Bob Thornton; Goliath	John Lithgow; The Crown	Sterling K. Brown; This Is Us
Best Actress in a Drama Series	Evan Rachel Wood; Westworld	Claire Foy; The Crown		Elisabeth Moss; The Handmaid's Tale
Best Supporting Actor in a Drama Series	John Lithgow; The Crown	—N/a	—N/a	John Lithgow; The Crown
Best Supporting Actress in a Drama Series	Thandie Newton; Westworld	—N/a	—N/a	Ann Dowd; The Handmaid's Tale
Best Actor in a Comedy Series	Donald Glover; Atlanta		William H. Macy; Shameless	Donald Glover; Atlanta
Best Actress in a Comedy Series	Kate McKinnon; Saturday Night Live	Tracee Ellis Ross; Black-ish	Julia Louis-Dreyfus; Veep	
Best Supporting Actor in a Comedy Series	Louie Anderson; Baskets	—N/a	—N/a	Alec Baldwin; Saturday Night Live
Best Supporting Actress in a Comedy Series	Jane Krakowski; Unbreakable Kimmy Schmidt	—N/a	—N/a	Kate McKinnon; Saturday Night Live
Best Actor in a Limited Series	Courtney B. Vance; The People v. O. J. Simpson: American Crime Story	Tom Hiddleston; The Night Manager	Bryan Cranston; All the Way	Riz Ahmed; The Night Of
Best Actress in a Limited Series	Sarah Paulson; The People v. O. J. Simpson: American Crime Story			Nicole Kidman; Big Little Lies
Best Supporting Actor in a Limited Series	Sterling K. Brown; The People v. O. J. Simpson: American Crime Story	Hugh Laurie; The Night Manager	—N/a	Alexander Skarsgård; Big Little Lies
Best Supporting Actress in a Limited Series	Regina King; American Crime	Olivia Colman; The Night Manager	—N/a	Laura Dern; Big Little Lies

== Television programs ==
=== Programs debuting in 2016 ===
These shows were scheduled to premiere in 2016. The premiere dates may have been changed depending on a variety of factors.

First aired	Show	Channel	Source
January 1	The Rap Game	Lifetime	
January 1	Shock Trauma: Edge of Life	Discovery Life	
January 3	Bordertown	Fox	
January 3	Cooper Barrett's Guide to Surviving Life	Fox	
January 3	Glada Entertains	Food Network	
January 4	Diesel Brothers	Discovery Channel	
January 4	Bachelor Live	ABC	
January 5	Pitch Slapped	Lifetime	
January 5	10 Things	truTV	
January 5	The Shannara Chronicles	MTV	
January 5	Killing Fields	Discovery Channel	
January 5	Zoe Ever After	BET	
January 6	Skin Tight	TLC	
January 6	Criminals at Work	BET	
January 7	Angel from Hell	CBS	
January 7	My Diet Is Better Than Yours	ABC	
January 7	Shades of Blue	NBC	
January 8	Ex Isle	We TV	
January 10	Live to Tell	History	
January 11	Lego Nexo Knights	Cartoon Network	
January 12	Shadowhunters	Freeform	
January 13	Second Chance	Fox	
January 13	Teachers	TV Land	
January 14	Colony	USA Network	
January 14	Idiotsitter	Comedy Central	
January 14	Greatest Party Story Ever	MTV	
January 15	The Lion Guard	Disney Channel/Disney Jr.	
January 17	Angie Tribeca	TBS	
January 17	Billions	Showtime	
January 17	Mercy Street	PBS	
January 17	The Real Housewives of Potomac	Bravo	
January 18	Mako Mermaids	Disney Channel	
January 18	The HALO Effect	Nickelodeon	
January 19	Planet Primetime	Travel Channel	
January 19	Fit to Fat to Fit	A&E	
January 20	Kocktails with Khloé	FYI	
January 21	Baskets	FX	
January 21	Dark Net	Showtime	
January 21	Legends of Tomorrow	The CW	
January 21	Recipe for Deception	Bravo	
January 23	NBA Saturday Primetime on ABC	ABC	
January 23	Floogals	Sprout	
January 23	Chelsea Does	Netflix	
January 25	Lucifer	Fox	
January 25	Recovery Road	Freeform	
January 25	Stevie J & Joseline: Go Hollywood	VH1	
January 26	Outsiders	WGN America	
January 28	You, Me and the Apocalypse	NBC	
January 28	Jo Frost: Nanny On Tour	Up TV	
February 1	Paradise Run	Nickelodeon	
February 2	American Crime Story	FX	
February 2	Rattled	TLC	
February 5	Animals	HBO	
February 5	Mack & Moxy	PBS Kids	
February 6	Bunnicula	Cartoon Network	
February 8	Full Frontal with Samantha Bee	TBS	
February 9	Not Safe with Nikki Glaser	Comedy Central	
February 11	Those Who Can't	truTV	
February 14	World of Quest	HBO	
February 14	Stuck in the Middle	Disney Channel	
February 15	Ready Jet Go!	PBS Kids	
February 17	Fat Chance	TLC	
February 19	Love	Netflix	
February 26	Fuller House	Netflix	
February 29	truInside	truTV	
March 1	Tour Group	Bravo	
March 2	Hap and Leonard	Sundance TV	
March 2	Lab Rats: Elite Force	Disney XD	
March 2	The Real O'Neals	ABC	
March 3	The Family	ABC	
March 3	Late Night Snack	truTV	
March 4	Lego Bionicle: The Journey to One	Netflix	
March 4	Lego Friends: The Power of Friendship	Netflix	
March 6	Pink Panther and Friends	Cartoon Network	
March 7	Little People	Sprout	
March 7	Damien	A&E	
March 8	Of Kings and Prophets	ABC	
March 8	Little Big Shots	NBC	
March 8	Separation Anxiety	TBS	
March 9	Underground	WGN America	
March 9	The Internet Ruined My Life	Syfy	
March 11	Flaked	Netflix	
March 11	Netflix Presents: The Characters	Netflix	
March 12	Party Over Here	Fox	
March 12	School of Rock	Nickelodeon	
March 13	Life or Debt	Spike	
March 15	Crowded	NBC	
March 16	Criminal Minds: Beyond Borders	CBS	
March 22	Heartbeat	NBC	
March 24	The Catch	ABC	
March 25	Backstage	Disney Channel	
March 29	Like a Boss	Oxygen	
March 30	Lopez	TV Land	
March 30	The Path	Hulu	
March 30	Quit Your Day Job	Oxygen	
March 31	Rush Hour	CBS	
April 1	The Ranch	Netflix	
April 1	Wynonna Earp	Syfy	
April 5	America's Greatest Makers	TBS	
April 5	Chasing Destiny	BET	
April 6	Walk the Prank	Disney XD	
April 10	Dice	Showtime	
April 10	The Girlfriend Experience	Starz	
April 11	The Detour	TBS	
April 11	Hunters	Syfy	
April 12	Game of Silence	NBC	
April 13	Strong	NBC	
April 14	American Grit	Fox	
April 14	The Dude Perfect Show	CMT	
April 15	Kong: King of the Apes	Netflix	
April 16	Dramaworld	Viki	
April 19	Containment	The CW	
April 20	There Goes The Motherhood	Bravo	
April 20	Get Blake!	Nicktoons	
April 21	Comedy Knockout	truTV	
April 26	Space's Deepest Secrets	Science Channel	
May 2	Houdini & Doyle	Fox	
May 2	The Loud House	Nickelodeon	
May 7	CBS Weekend News	CBS	
May 9	Peanuts by Schulz	Cartoon Network/Boomerang	
May 11	Chelsea	Netflix	
May 17	Coupled	Fox	
May 20	Lady Dynamite	Netflix	
May 22	Preacher	AMC	
May 23	Mygrations	National Geographic Channel	
May 27	Counterfeit Cat	Disney XD	
May 30	Atomic Puppet	Disney XD	
May 31	Maya & Marty	NBC	
June 1	Cleverman	Sundance TV	
June 3	Outcast	Cinemax	
June 3	All in with Cam Newton	Nickelodeon	
June 5	Feed the Beast	AMC	
June 10	Voltron: Legendary Defender	Netflix	
June 12	Still the King	CMT	
June 13	BrainDead	CBS	
June 13	Guilt	Freeform	
June 13	Spartan: Ultimate Team Challenge	NBC	
June 14	Animal Kingdom	TNT	
June 14	Speak	FS1	
June 14	Uncle Buck	ABC	
June 14	Wrecked	TBS	
June 22	American Gothic	CBS	
June 22	Any Given Wednesday with Bill Simmons	HBO	
June 22	Escape the Night	YouTube Premium	
June 23	Queen of the South	USA Network	
June 24	Bizaardvark	Disney Channel	
June 24	Justin Time Go	Netflix	
June 26	Roadies	Showtime	
June 28	Dead of Summer	Freeform	
July 5	Crashletes	Nickelodeon	
July 5	Greatest Ever	truTV	
July 5	Fangbone!	Disney XD	
July 8	Word Party	Netflix	
July 9	Legendary Dudas	Nickelodeon	
July 15	Stranger Things	Netflix	
July 17	Vice Principals	HBO	
July 22	Elena of Avalor	Disney Channel	
July 24	Ozzy & Jack's World Detour	History	
July 29	Home: Adventures with Tip & Oh	Netflix	
July 29	Last Chance U	Netflix	
July 31	Van Helsing	Syfy	
August 1	Future-Worm!	Disney XD	
August 1	MTV Classic Videos	MTV Classic	
August 2	90s Nation	MTV Classic	
August 2	Total Request Playlist	MTV Classic	
August 3	Yo! Hip Hop Mix	MTV Classic	
August 3	House of Pop	MTV Classic	
August 4	I Want My 80s	MTV Classic	
August 5	Rock Block	MTV Classic	
August 8	120 Minutes	MTV Classic	
August 12	Metal Mayhem	MTV Classic	
August 12	The Get Down	Netflix	
August 12	Ask the StoryBots	Netflix	
August 13	Regal Academy	Nickelodeon	
August 14	Chesapeake Shores	Hallmark Channel	
August 17	My Last Days	The CW	
August 22	Food Network Star Kids	Food Network	
August 23	Better Late Than Never	NBC	
August 24	Cleveland Hustles	CNBC	
September 1	Jim & Chrissy: Vow or Never	We TV	
September 2	Kulipari: An Army of Frogs	Netflix	
September 6	The 11th Hour	MSNBC	
September 6	Atlanta	FX	
September 8	Better Things	FX	
September 9	One Mississippi	Amazon Video	
September 9	Quarry	Cinemax	
September 9	Jagger Eaton's Mega Life	Nickelodeon	
September 11	Rob & Chyna	E!	
September 11	Son of Zorn	Fox	
September 12	Harry	Syndication	
September 12	T.D. Jakes	Syndication	
September 12	The Robert Irvine Show	The CW	
September 12	The ZhuZhus	Disney Channel	
September 14	Legends of Chamberlain Heights	Comedy Central	
September 16	High Maintenance	HBO	
September 19	The Good Place	NBC	
September 19	Kevin Can Wait	CBS	
September 19	Right Now Kapow	Disney XD	
September 20	Bull	CBS	
September 20	This Is Us	NBC	
September 21	Designated Survivor	ABC	
September 21	Falling Water	USA Network	
September 21	Lethal Weapon	Fox	
September 21	Speechless	ABC	
September 22	Notorious	ABC	
September 22	Pitch	Fox	
September 22	Easy	Netflix	
September 23	The Exorcist	Fox	
September 23	MacGyver	CBS	
September 27	Channel Zero	Syfy	
September 28	Big Brother: Over the Top	CBS All Access	
September 29	Mighty Magiswords	Cartoon Network	
September 30	Luke Cage	Netflix	
October 2	Westworld	HBO	
October 3	Conviction	ABC	
October 3	Timeless	NBC	
October 3	Milo Murphy's Law	Disney XD	
October 3	Kuu Kuu Harajuku	Nickelodeon	
October 4	No Tomorrow	The CW	
October 5	Frequency	The CW	
October 5	Total Bellas	E!	
October 9	Divorce	HBO	
October 9	Insecure	HBO	
October 10	Vice News Tonight	HBO	
October 11	American Housewife	ABC	
October 14	Goliath	Amazon Video	
October 14	Haters Back Off	Netflix	
October 16	Berlin Station	Epix	
October 16	Eyewitness	USA Network	
October 16	Graves	Epix	
October 19	Chance	Hulu	
October 22	Dot.	Sprout	
October 24	Man with a Plan	CBS	
October 26	Jon Glaser Loves Gear	truTV	
October 27	The Great Indoors	CBS	
October 27	Pure Genius	CBS	
October 28	Good Girls Revolt	Amazon Video	
October 28	Skylanders Academy	Netflix	
October 28	Trailer Park Boys Out of the Park: Europe	Netflix	
November 4	The Crown	Netflix	
November 4	World of Winx	Netflix	
November 7	Martha & Snoop's Potluck Dinner Party	VH1	
November 7	P. King Duckling	Disney Jr.	
November 11	Mech-X4	Disney XD	
November 11	Roman Empire	Netflix	
November 14	Mars: The Secret Science	Science Channel	
November 15	Good Behavior	TNT	
November 15	Shooter	USA Network	
November 18	The Grand Tour	Amazon Video	
November 21	Search Party	TBS	
November 23	Splash and Bubbles	PBS Kids	
November 30	Incorporated	Syfy	
December 4	Mariah's World	E!	
December 7	Shut Eye	Hulu	
December 9	Captive	Netflix	
December 9	White Rabbit Project	Netflix	
December 9	Luna Petunia	Netflix	
December 13	Restored by the Fords	HGTV	
December 14	Star	Fox	
December 16	Justice League Action	Cartoon Network	
December 16	The OA	Netflix	
December 19	Leave It to Stevie	VH1	
December 20	Terry Crews Saves Christmas	The CW	
December 23	Trollhunters: Tales of Arcadia	Netflix	
December 27	Chasing Cameron	Netflix	

=== Miniseries ===
First aired	Title	Channel	Source
January 18	War & Peace	A&E, History, and Lifetime	
January 24	The X-Files	Fox	
February 3	Madoff	ABC	
February 16	11.22.63	Hulu	
February 20	Serial Thriller: The Headhunter	Investigation Discovery	
March 6	Race for the White House	CNN	
March 31	The Eighties	CNN	
April 19	The Night Manager	AMC	
May 30	Roots	A&E, History, and Lifetime	
June 11	The American West	AMC	
July 10	The Night Of	HBO	
September 5	Harley and the Davidsons	Discovery Channel	
September 18	The Case of: JonBenét Ramsey	CBS	
September 30	Crisis in Six Scenes	Amazon Video	

=== Television films and specials ===
First aired	Title	Channel	Source
January 4	The Breaks	VH1	
January 9	My Sweet Audrina	Lifetime	
January 23	Toni Braxton: Unbreak My Heart	Lifetime	
January 30	Lila & Eve	Lifetime	
January 31	Grease: Live	Fox	
March 20	Ice Age: The Great Egg-Scapade	Fox	
March 20	The Passion: New Orleans	Fox	
April 16	Confirmation	HBO	
May 17	Megyn Kelly Presents	Fox	
May 21	All the Way	HBO	
May 30	The Dresser	Starz	
June 2	Quincy Jones: Burning the Light	HBO	
June 24	Adventures in Babysitting	Disney Channel	
July 31	Sharknado: The 4th Awakens	Syfy	
September 1	Holy Hell	CNN	
September 17	The Beatles: Eight Days a Week	Hulu	
October 7	The Swap	Disney Channel	
October 20	The Rocky Horror Picture Show: Let's Do the Time Warp Again	Fox	
November 20	Elena and the Secret of Avalor	Disney Channel	
November 24	The Wonderful World of Disney: Magical Holiday Celebration	ABC	
November 25	Once Upon a Sesame Street Christmas	HBO	
November 26	Legends of the Hidden Temple	Nickelodeon	
December 2	Mr. Neighbor's House	Adult Swim	
December 7	Hairspray Live!	NBC	
December 9	Albert	Nickelodeon	

=== Programs changing networks ===
Show	Moved from	Moved to	Source
Miss Universe pageant	NBC	Fox	
Miss USA pageant	Reelz	Fox	
Impact Wrestling	Destination America	Pop	
Sesame Street	PBS	HBO	
WWE SmackDown	Syfy	USA Network	
Hoarders	Lifetime	A&E	
SportsNation	ESPN2	ESPN	
America's Next Top Model	The CW	VH1	
Motive	ABC	USA Network	
Grossology	Discovery Family	Qubo	
Sports Jeopardy!	Crackle	Crackle / NBCSN	
Supergirl	CBS	The CW	
The Last Alaskans	Animal Planet	Discovery Channel	
High Maintenance	Vimeo	HBO	
Primetime Justice with Ashleigh Banfield	CNN (as Legal View)	HLN (as Primetime Justice)	
Sonic Boom	Cartoon Network	Boomerang	
Mad TV	Fox	The CW	
Kung Fu Panda: Legends of Awesomeness	Nickelodeon	Nicktoons	
Breadwinners	Nickelodeon	Nicktoons	
Pig Goat Banana Cricket	Nickelodeon	Nicktoons	

=== Programs returning in 2016 ===
The following shows will return with new episodes after being canceled or ended their run previously:

Show	Last aired	Type of return	Previous channel	New/returning/same channel	Return date	Source
The Increasingly Poor Decisions of Todd Margaret	2012	New Season	IFC	same	January 7	
The X-Files	2002	Revival	Fox	same	January 24	
The Powerpuff Girls	2005	Reboot	Cartoon Network	same	April 4	
Disappeared	2013	New season	Investigation Discovery	same	April 11	
To Tell the Truth	2001	Revival	Syndication	ABC	June 14	
The $100,000 Pyramid	2012	Reboot	Game Show Network	ABC	June 26	
Match Game	1999	Revival	Syndication	ABC	June 26	
Mad TV	2009	Revival	Fox	The CW	July 26	
Black Mirror	2014	Revival	Channel 4 (UK)	Netflix	October 21	
Space Racers	2015	New season	PBS Kids	PBS Kids / Sprout	October 31	
Gilmore Girls (as Gilmore Girls: A Year in the Life)	2007	New season	The CW	Netflix	November 25	

=== Milestone episodes ===
Show	Network	Episode #	Episode title	Episode air date	Source
2 Broke Girls	CBS	100th	"And the Not Regular Down There"	January 13	
Robot Chicken	Adult Swim	150th	"The Unnamed One"	January 17	
Last Man Standing	ABC	100th	"The Ring"	January 29	
New Girl	Fox	100th	"Reagan"	February 9	
The Big Bang Theory	CBS	200th	"The Celebration Experimentation"	February 25	
Regular Show	Cartoon Network	200th	"Chili Cook Off"	March 5	
Once Upon a Time	ABC	100th	"Souls of the Departed"	March 6	
RuPaul's Drag Race	Logo	100th	"Keeping It 100!"	March 7	
Grimm	NBC	100th	"Into the Schwarzwald"	March 11	
NCIS	CBS	300th	"Scope"	March 15	
American Dad!	TBS	200th	"The Two Hundred"	March 28	
Bob's Burgers	Fox	100th	"Stand by Gene"	May 22	
Person of Interest	CBS	100th	"The Day the World Went Away"	May 31	
Royal Pains	USA	100th	"Doubt of Africa"	June 8	
The Tonight Show Starring Jimmy Fallon	NBC	500th	"Michael Strahan/Parker Posey/Margo Price"	July 14	
Rizzoli & Isles	TNT	100th	"2M7258-100"	July 25	
Real Time with Bill Maher	HBO	400th	"Amy Holmes/Michael Moynihan/Salman Rushdie"	July 28	
Steven Universe	Cartoon Network	100th	"Beta"	August 5	
The Garfield Show	Boomerang	100th	"Bulldog of Doom"	August 10	
The Garfield Show	Boomerang	100th	"Mother Owl"	August 11	
The Amazing World of Gumball	Cartoon Network	150th	"The Blame"	August 16	
Pretty Little Liars	Freeform	150th	"The DArkest Knight"	August 30	
Teen Titans Go!	Cartoon Network	150th	"Booty Scooty"	September 5	
The Simpsons	Fox	600th	"Treehouse of Horror XXVII"	October 16	
Elementary	CBS	100th	"Henny Penny the Sky is Falling"	October 30	
Teenage Mutant Ninja Turtles	Nickelodeon	100th	"The Power Inside Her"	November 20	
Arrow	The CW	100th	"Invasion!"	November 30	
Chicago Fire	NBC	100th	"One Hundred"	December 6	

=== Programs ending in 2016 ===
End date	Show	Channel	First aired	Status	Source
January 4	The Penguins of Madagascar	Nickelodeon	2008	Ended	
January 10	Austin & Ally	Disney Channel	2011	Ended	
January 14	The Increasingly Poor Decisions of Todd Margaret	IFC	2010	Ended	
January 22	Unforgettable	A&E	2011	Cancelled	
January 29	Undateable	NBC	2014	Cancelled	
January 31	Galavant	ABC	2015	Cancelled	
February 3	Lab Rats	Disney XD	2012	Ended	
February 7	Melissa Harris-Perry	MSNBC	2012	Cancelled	
February 15	Gravity Falls	Disney XD	2012	Ended	
February 22	Telenovela	NBC	2015	Cancelled	
February 22	The Biggest Loser (returned in 2020)	NBC	2004	Cancelled	
February 23	Pitch Slapped	Lifetime	2016	Cancelled	
February 24	Fresh Beat Band of Spies	Nick Jr.	2015	Cancelled	
March 1	Agent Carter	ABC	2015	Cancelled	
March 1	The Muppets	ABC	2015	Cancelled	
March 2	The Mysteries of Laura	NBC	2014	Cancelled	
March 13	CSI: Cyber	CBS	2015	Cancelled	
March 15	Of Kings and Prophets	ABC	2016	Cancelled	
March 21	Stevie J & Joseline: Go Hollywood	VH1	2016	Cancelled	
March 25	Second Chance	Fox	2016	Cancelled	
March 28	Recovery Road	Freeform	2016	Cancelled	
April 1	American Restoration	History	2010	Cancelled	
April 7	American Idol (returned in 2018)	Fox	2002	Cancelled	
April 10	Togetherness	HBO	2015	Cancelled	
April 15	Childrens Hospital	Adult Swim	2010	Ended	
April 17	Vinyl	HBO	2016	Cancelled	
April 20	Deadbeat	Hulu	2014	Cancelled	
April 22	Mack & Moxy	PBS	2016	Cancelled	
April 26	Limitless	CBS	2015	Cancelled	
April 30	Monopoly Millionaires' Club	Syndication	2015	Cancelled	
May 8	The Good Wife	CBS	2009	Ended	
May 9	Damien	A&E	2016	Cancelled	
May 10	Grandfathered	Fox	2015	Cancelled	
May 10	The Grinder	Fox	2015	Cancelled	
May 12	Super Why! (returned in 2023 and also broadcast in 2026)	PBS Kids	2007	Ended	
May 15	The Family	ABC	2016	Cancelled	
May 16	Castle	ABC	2009	Cancelled	
May 16	Mike & Molly	CBS	2010	Ended	
May 17	Faking It	MTV	2014	Cancelled	
May 20	Banshee	Cinemax	2013	Ended	
May 20	The Meredith Vieira Show	Syndication	2014	Cancelled	
May 22	Bordertown	Fox	2016	Cancelled	
May 22	Crowded	NBC	2016	Cancelled	
May 25	Heartbeat	NBC	2016	Cancelled	
June 2	Strong	NBC	2016	Cancelled	
June 4	Littlest Pet Shop	Discovery Family	2012	Ended	
June 5	Game of Silence	NBC	2016	Cancelled	
June 12	House of Lies	Showtime	2012	Ended	
June 16	Inside Amy Schumer (returned in 2022)	Comedy Central	2013	Cancelled	
June 17	FABLife	Syndication	2015	Cancelled	
June 19	Penny Dreadful	Showtime	2014	Ended	
June 21	Person of Interest	CBS	2011	Ended	
June 22	The Soul Man	TV Land	2012	Ended	
June 26	Cooper Barrett's Guide to Surviving Life	Fox	2016	Cancelled	
June 27	Wander Over Yonder	Disney XD	2013	Cancelled	
June 29	Kung Fu Panda: Legends of Awesomeness	Nicktoons	2011	Ended	
July 4	Houdini & Doyle	Fox	2016	Cancelled	
July 5	Uncle Buck	ABC	2016	Cancelled	
July 6	Royal Pains	USA Network	2009	Ended	
July 11	Hunters	Syfy	2016	Cancelled	
July 12	Maya & Marty	NBC	2016	Cancelled	
July 18	Almost Genius	truTV	2016	Cancelled	
July 23	Angel from Hell	CBS	2016	Cancelled	
July 23	Hell on Wheels	AMC	2011	Ended	
July 27	Wayward Pines	Fox	2015	Cancelled	
July 29	Check It Out! with Dr. Steve Brule	Adult Swim	2010	Cancelled	
July 29	Sanjay and Craig	Nickelodeon	2013	Ended	
August 2	Coupled	Fox	2016	Cancelled	
August 2	Feed the Beast	AMC	2016	Cancelled	
August 4	Home Free	Fox	2015	Cancelled	
August 6	Devious Maids	Lifetime	2013	Cancelled	
August 9	Not Safe with Nikki Glaser	Comedy Central	2016	Cancelled	
August 18	The Nightly Show with Larry Wilmore	Comedy Central	2015	Cancelled	
August 19	The McLaughlin Group (returned in 2018 and 2019)	Syndication	1982	Ended	
August 20	Rush Hour	CBS	2016	Cancelled	
August 21	The Jim Gaffigan Show	TV Land	2015	Cancelled	
August 22	Guilt	Freeform	2016	Cancelled	
August 22	Food Network Star Kids	Food Network	2016	Cancelled	
August 28	Roadies	Showtime	2016	Cancelled	
August 30	Dead of Summer	Freeform	2016	Cancelled	
September 1	Sex & Drugs & Rock & Roll	FX	2015	Cancelled	
September 4	Murder in the First	TNT	2014	Cancelled	
September 5	Rizzoli & Isles	TNT	2010	Ended	
September 6	Mistresses	ABC	2013	Cancelled	
September 7	American Gothic	CBS	2016	Cancelled	
September 7	Tyrant	FX	2014	Cancelled	
September 9	Crazy Talk	Syndication	2015	Cancelled	
September 9	The Bill Cunningham Show	The CW	2011	Ended	
September 10	Aquarius	NBC	2015	Cancelled	
September 11	BrainDead	CBS	2016	Cancelled	
September 12	Breadwinners	Nicktoons	2014	Cancelled	
September 15	Beauty & the Beast	The CW	2012	Ended	
September 18	Brad Neely's Harg Nallin' Sclopio Peepio	Adult Swim	2016	Cancelled	
October 1	Mixels	Cartoon Network	2014	Ended	
October 6	Jim & Chrissy: Vow or Never	We TV	2016	Cancelled	
October 13	Nancy Grace	HLN	2005	Ended	
October 16	Wonder Pets!	Nick Jr.	2006	Ended	
October 21	Bubble Guppies (returned in 2019)	Nickelodeon/Nick Jr.	2011	Ended	
October 22	Lab Rats: Elite Force	Disney XD	2016	Cancelled	
October 28	Good Girls Revolt	Amazon Video	2016	Cancelled	
November 1	From Dusk till Dawn: The Series	El Rey Network	2014	Cancelled	
November 5	The 7D	Disney XD	2014	Cancelled	
November 6	Mickey Mouse Clubhouse (returned in 2025 as Mickey Mouse Clubhouse+)	Disney Jr.	2006	Ended	
November 6	Jake and the Never Land Pirates	Disney Jr.	2011	Ended	
November 9	Any Given Wednesday with Bill Simmons	HBO	2016	Cancelled	
November 9	Full Circle	Audience Network	2013	Cancelled	
November 13	Masters of Sex	Showtime	2013	Cancelled	
November 16	All in with Cam Newton	Nickelodeon	2016	Cancelled	
December 2	Comedy Bang! Bang!	IFC	2012	Ended	
December 4	Secrets and Lies	ABC	2015	Cancelled	
December 7	Impastor	TV Land	2015	Cancelled	
December 8	Notorious	ABC	2016	Cancelled	
December 8	Pitch	Fox	2016	Cancelled	
December 11	Blunt Talk	Starz	2015	Cancelled	
December 11	Best Friends Whenever	Disney Channel	2015	Cancelled	
December 14	Rectify	Sundance TV	2013	Ended	
December 18	Eyewitness	USA Network	2016	Cancelled	
December 20	Scream Queens	Fox	2015	Cancelled	

=== Entering syndication in 2016 ===
A list of programs (current or canceled) that have accumulated enough episodes (between 65 and 100) or seasons (3 or more) to be eligible for off-network syndication and/or basic cable runs.

Show	Seasons	In Production	Source
Agents of S.H.I.E.L.D.	3	Yes	
Last Man Standing	6	Yes	
Major Crimes	5	Yes	
Nashville	5	Yes	
Pawn Stars	12	Yes	

== Networks and services ==
=== Launches ===
Network name	Type	Launch date	Notes	Source
Gun TV	Cable television	April 1		
Light TV	Cable television	December 22		

=== Conversions and rebrandings ===
Old network name	New network name	Type	Conversion Date	Notes	Source
ABC Family	Freeform	Cable television	January 12		
Palladia	MTV Live	Cable television	February 1		
H2	Viceland	Cable television	February 29		
Encore Action	Starz Encore Action	Cable television	April 5		
Encore Black	Starz Encore Black	Cable television	April 5		
Encore Classic	Starz Encore Classic	Cable television	April 5		
Encore Espanol	Starz Encore Espanol	Cable television	April 5		
Encore Family	Starz Encore Family	Cable television	April 5		
Encore Suspense	Starz Encore Suspense	Cable television	April 5		
The Church Channel	Hillsong Channel	Cable television	June 1		
MTV Hits	NickMusic	Cable television	September 9		

=== Closures ===
Network	Type	Closure date	Notes	Source
Al Jazeera America	Cable television	April 12		
MundoMax	OTA television	November 30		

== Television stations ==
=== Station launches ===
Date	Market	Station	Channel	Affiliation	Source
January 1	Nashville, TN	WZTV-DT3	17.3	Antenna TV	
January 1	Anderson, SC	WMYA-TV	40.4	Grit	
January 27	Bowling Green, KY	WCZU-LD3	39.3	Bounce TV	
February 1	Rapid City, SD	KEVN-LD	7.1	Fox	
May 5	Sidney, NE	KNEP-DT2	4.2	NBC	
May 5	Scottsbluff, NE	KSTF-DT2	10.2	NBC	
June 1	Merrimack, NH/Boston	WNEU-DT3	60.3	Cozi TV	
June 22	Lexington, KY	WLEX-DT3	18.3	Bounce TV	
July 1	Birmingham, AL	WUOA-LD	46.1; 46.2; 46.3	Laff; Buzzr; Escape	
August 1	Duluth, MN	KBJR-DT3	6.3	MyNetworkTV	
August 1	Peoria, IL	WEEK-DT2	25.2	ABC	
August 1	Peoria, IL	WEEK-DT3	25.3	The CW	
August 24	Bowling Green, KY	WCZU-LD	39.4	Sonlife Broadcasting Network	
September 1	Watertown, NY	WWTI-DT3	50.3	Laff	
September 1	Watertown, NY	WWTI-DT4	50.4	Escape	
September 1	Evansville, IN	WTVW-DT3	7.3	Escape	
September 1	Evansville, IN	WEHT-DT2	25.2	Laff	
September 3	Utica, NY	WUTR-DT3	20.3	Grit	
September 3	Utica, NY	WUTR-DT4	20.4	Bounce TV	
September 3	Utica, NY	WFXV-DT2	33.2	Escape	
September 3	Utica, NY	WFXV-DT3	33.3	Laff	
September 12	Alexandria, LA	KALB-DT3	5.3	The CW	
September 12	Fargo, ND	KXJB-LD2	30.2	The CW	
September 12	Madison, WI	WMTV-DT4	15.4	WeatherNation TV	
September 23	Bowling Green, KY	WCZU-LD	39.5; 39.6	Grit; Escape	
October 17	Albuquerque, New Mexico	KNME-TV	5.3	FNX	
October 25	Lafayette, IN	WPBI-LD	16.1	Fox	
October 25	Lafayette, IN	WPBI-LD2	16.2	NBC	
November 1	St. Joseph, MO	KNPG-LD2	21.2	The CW (via The CW Plus) (moves from KBJO-LD; see below for more information)	
December 1	Watertown, NY	WVNC-LD	45.1	NBC	
December 1	Santa Barbara/Santa Maria, CA	KWSM-LP	32.2	SonLife Broadcasting Network	
December 1	Springfield, MO	KRFT-LD	8.6	Estrella TV	
December 19	Lawrence/Boston	WMFP-DT5	60.5	Independent/Cozi TV	

=== Stations changing network affiliations ===
Date	Market	Station	Channel	Prior affiliation	New affiliation	Source
January 1	Christiansted, VI	WSVI	8.1	ABC	Ion Television	
January 1	Asheville, NC	WLOS	13.3	Grit	Antenna TV	
February 1	Nashville, TN	WKRN-DT2	2.2	Weather	MeTV	
February 1	Johnson City, TN/Tri-Cities, TN/VA	WJHL-DT2	11.2	MeTV	ABC	
February 1	Kingsport, TN/Tri-Cities, TN/VA	WKPT-TV	19.1	ABC	MyNetworkTV	
February 1	Kingsport, TN/Tri-Cities, TN/VA	WAPK-CD	36.1	MyNetworkTV	MeTV	
February 1	Lead, SD	KHSD-TV → KQME	11.1 → 10.1	ABC	MeTV	
February 1	Lead, SD	KIVV-TV → KHSD-TV	5.1 → 11.1	Fox	ABC	
February 1	Rapid City, SD	KOTA-TV → KHME	3.1 → 23.1	ABC	MeTV	
February 1	Rapid City, SD	KEVN-TV → KOTA-TV	7.1 → 3.1	Fox	ABC	
February 29	Raleigh/Durham, NC	WRAL-TV	5.1	CBS	NBC	
February 29	Raleigh/Durham, NC	WNCN	17.1	NBC	CBS	
June 1	Lawrence, MA	WMFP	62.1	Cozi TV	Sonlife Broadcasting Network	
July 1	Hagerstown, MD	WHAG-TV	25.1	NBC	Independent/Heroes & Icons	
August 1	Peoria, IL	WHOI	19.1	ABC	Comet	
August 1	Fort Wayne, IN	WPTA-DT2	21.2	The CW	NBC	
August 1	Fort Wayne, IN	WPTA-DT3	21.3	Weather Radar	MyNetworkTV	
August 1	Fort Wayne, IN	WISE-TV	33.1	NBC	The CW	
August 1	Fort Wayne, IN	WISE-DT2	33.2	MyNetworkTV	Weather Radar	
August 1	South Bend, IN	WSBT-DT2	22.2	Independent	Fox	
August 1	South Bend, IN	WSJV	28.1	Fox	Heroes & Icons	
August 1	Duluth, MN	KDLH	3.1	CBS	The CW	
August 1	Duluth, MN	KBJR-DT2	6.2	MyNetworkTV	CBS	
September 1	Chicago, IL	WGN-TV	9.1	The CW	Independent	
September 1	Chicago, IL	WPWR-TV	50.1	MyNetworkTV	The CW (MyNetworkTV remains secondary)	
September 1	Watertown, NY	WNYF-CD2	28.2	CBS (simulcast of WWNY-TV)	MeTV	
September 1	Fort Worth-Dallas, TX	KFWD	52.1	MundoMax	SonLife Broadcasting Network	
September 1	Jackson, MS	WJTV-DT3	12.3	Antenna TV	Ion	
September 12	Savannah, GA	WSAV-DT2	3.2	MyNetworkTV/MeTV	The CW	
September 12	Savannah, GA	WSAV-DT3	3.3	Weather	MyNetworkTV/MeTV	
September 12	Savannah, GA	WGSA	35.1	The CW	Independent	
September 12	Waterloo/Iowa City, IA	KWWL-DT2	7.2	This TV	The CW	
September 12	Waterloo/Iowa City, IA	KWKB	20.1	The CW	This TV	
September 12	Alexandria, LA	KBCA	41.1	The CW	Heroes & Icons	
September 12	Madison/Janesville, WI	WMTV-DT2	15.2	WeatherNation TV	The CW	
September 12	Madison/Janesville, WI	WIFS	57.1	The CW	Independent	
October 1	Indianapolis, IN	WRTV-DT2	6.2	HTSN (local sports/newscast replays)	Grit	
November 1	St. Joseph, MO	KBJO-LD	21.1	The CW (via The CW Plus) (moved to subchannel 21.2)	NBC (as KNPG-LD)	
November 1	White House/Nashville, TN	WKUW-LD	40.3	Escape	American Sports Network	
December 1	Clovis/Fresno, CA	KGMC	43.1	MundoMax	Estrella TV	
December 1	Fort Myers/Naples, FL	WXCW-DT2/3	46.2/3	MundoMax	Estrella TV	
December 1	Fort Myers/Naples, FL	WGPS-LP	22.1	Estrella TV	Cozi TV	
December 1	Los Angeles, CA	KWHY-TV	22.1	MundoMax	Independent	
December 1	Miami/Fort Lauderdale, FL	WGEN-TV	8.1	MundoMax	Azteca	
December 1	Miami/Fort Lauderdale, FL	WDGT-LD	24.1	Azteca	Justice Network	
December 1	Philadelphia, PA	WPSJ-CD	8.1	MundoMax	SonLife Broadcasting Network	
December 1	Phoenix/Kingman, AZ	KMOH-TV	6.1	MundoMax	América Tevé	
December 1	Santa Barbara-Santa Maria, CA	KSBT-LD	32.1	MundoMax	Independent	
December 1	Santa Barbara-Santa Maria, CA	KWSM-LP	32.1	SonLife Broadcasting Network	Estrella TV	
December 1	Springfield, MO	KRFT-LD	8.1	MundoMax	Retro TV	
