= Pitch Slapped =

Television series

- Starring: Diana Preisler; Deke Sharon
- Judges: Dr. Frances Covalesky
- Country of origin: United States
- Original language: English
- No. of seasons: 1
- No. of episodes: 8

Production
- Executive producers: Colleen Conway Grogan; Eli Lehrer; Glenn Schubert; Greg Goldman; Mary Donahue; Stephen Lambert
- Production companies: All3Media America; InsomniaTV; Studio Lambert

Original release
- Network: Lifetime
- Release: January 5 – February 23, 2016

Pitch Slapped is a reality show on Lifetime. It premiered on January 5, 2016. It follows a cappella teams from two New Jersey high schools that are mentored by some of the best coaches in the industry as they face off in weekly competitions, leading up to a championship sing-off. Cherry Hill's Stay Tuned learns under the tutelage of Deke Sharon—who was the on-site music director for the Pitch Perfect films—while singer and performance coach Diana Preisler guides Highlands Voices as they prep for their performances.

== Groups ==
=== Highlands Voices ===
One of the two groups featured on the show. Coached by Diana Preisler. They are one of the top groups locally and win wherever they go, even nationals. They feel as if they are in a rut and choose Diana to guide them with their performances.

- Seniors: Andrew, Blue, Dan, Maddie, Philip, Vanessa, Neftali
- Freshman: Mariela

=== Stay Tuned ===
One of the two groups featured on the show. Coached by Deke Sharon. They are the underdogs and call themselves "Stay Second" because they seem to always fall short to Highlands Voices. Unlike most a cappella groups, they have 21 members. They choose Deke to help them finally overcome their rivals.

- Seniors: Paulina, Nicole, Casey, Megan, Phoebe, Brielle, Ibinye, Amrita, Nick
- Juniors: Jack, David "D-Kahn", Sam, Winnie, Abigail, Sergio, Chris "Cha", Tarryl
- Sophomores: Ashley, Cedric, Adam, Justin

== Guest Groups ==
Vocal Forte & Unaccompanied Minors

== Judges ==
Joan Bujacich, MEANJ President helped organize the judges for the majority of the episodes. Judges included Joan Bujacich, Joseph Bilotti, Lisa Gonzalez, Kathy Knittel, Diana Hessinger, Yuka Yanagi, Jeff Seitz, amir Mortezai, Dr. Frances Covalesky, and Adjunct College Music Professor.

=== Week One ===
No guests. Highlands Voices and Stay Tuned were head-to-head.

=== Week Two ===
- The Rolling Tones: A group featured in Season 1, Episode 2 "Will They Stay Two?". Went head-to-head with Highlands Voices.
- Chock Full of Notes: A group featured in Season 1, Episode 2 "Will They Stay Two?". Went head-to-head with Stay Tuned.

=== Week Three ===
Vocal Forte: A group featured in Season 1, Episode 3, "This is Aca-War!". Went head-to-head with Highlands Voices.

SounXplosion: A group featured in Season 1, Episode 3, "This is Aca-War!". Went head-to-head with Stay Tuned. *Not including the seniors.

== Episodes ==
=== Season 1 (2016) ===
No. in Series	No. in Season	Title	Original Air Date	Production Code
1	1	Aca-Gods	January 5, 2016	101
Two rival a cappella teams bring in professional coaches to give them an edge for the summer season; the coaches have eight weeks to prepare the teams for the Summer Invitational. Highlands Voices sings "Rather Be" by Clean Bandit. They score a 69 out of 90. Stay turned sing "Hide and Seek" by Imogen Heap. They score a 61 out of 90. Highlands Voices win.
1	2	Will They Stay Two?	January 12, 2016	102
The teams take on two new competitors; Stay Tuned struggles with their first choreographed song; Deke takes a chance with a new soloist; However, Diana may have to forfeit when a key team member does not show up the day before the competition due to illness.
1	3	This is Aca-War!	January 19, 2016	103
Stay Tuned learns half of their team will not be able to attend this week's competition; Coach Diana takes a huge risk by giving the lead solo to an unsuspecting member of Highlands Voices.
1	4	The Cruella of A Cappella	January 26, 2016	104
The members of Highlands Voices decide to push back at Diana's methods; Stay Tuned's natural talent is threatened by a natural disaster.
1	5	Eliminations Begin	February 2, 2016	105
1	6	Rise of the Underclassmen	February 9, 2016	106
1	7	Deke Plays With Fire	February 16, 2016	107
1	8	It A-Comes Down to This	February 23, 2016	108

== Performances ==
=== Season 1 (2016) ===
No.	Episode	Group	Soloist(s)	Songs	Results Vocal Performance/Vocal Arrangement/Visual Performance Overall	Winner
1	Aca-God's	Highlands Voices	Vanessa	"Rather Be"; Clean Bandit feat. Jess Glynne	24 | 23 | 22; 69/90	Highlands Voices
1	Aca-God's	Highlands Voices	Philip, Maddie	"Young Blood"; Bea Miller	N/A	Highlands Voices
1	Aca-God's	Stay Tuned	N/A	"Hide and Seek"; Imogen Heap	25 | 25 | 11; 61/90	Highlands Voices
1	Aca-God's	Stay Tuned	Nicole	"Safe with Me"; Sam Smith	N/A	Highlands Voices
2	Will They Stay Two?	Chock Full of Notes	N/A	"Stay With Me"; Sam Smith	18 | 12 | 15; 45/90	Stay Tuned
2	Will They Stay Two?	Stay Tuned	Sam, Jack, Amrita, Megan, Ashley, Cedric	"Shake It Off"; Taylor Swift	24 | 23 | 25; 72/90	Stay Tuned
2	Will They Stay Two?	Rolling Tones	N/A	"Love Runs Out"; OneRepublic	22 | 19 | 18; 59/90	Highlands Voices; Overall Highscore
2	Will They Stay Two?	Highlands Voices	Maddie	"Lips Are Movin"; Meghan Trainor	27 | 27 | 28; 82/90	Highlands Voices; Overall Highscore
