= Salesforce West =

High-rise building in San Francisco, US

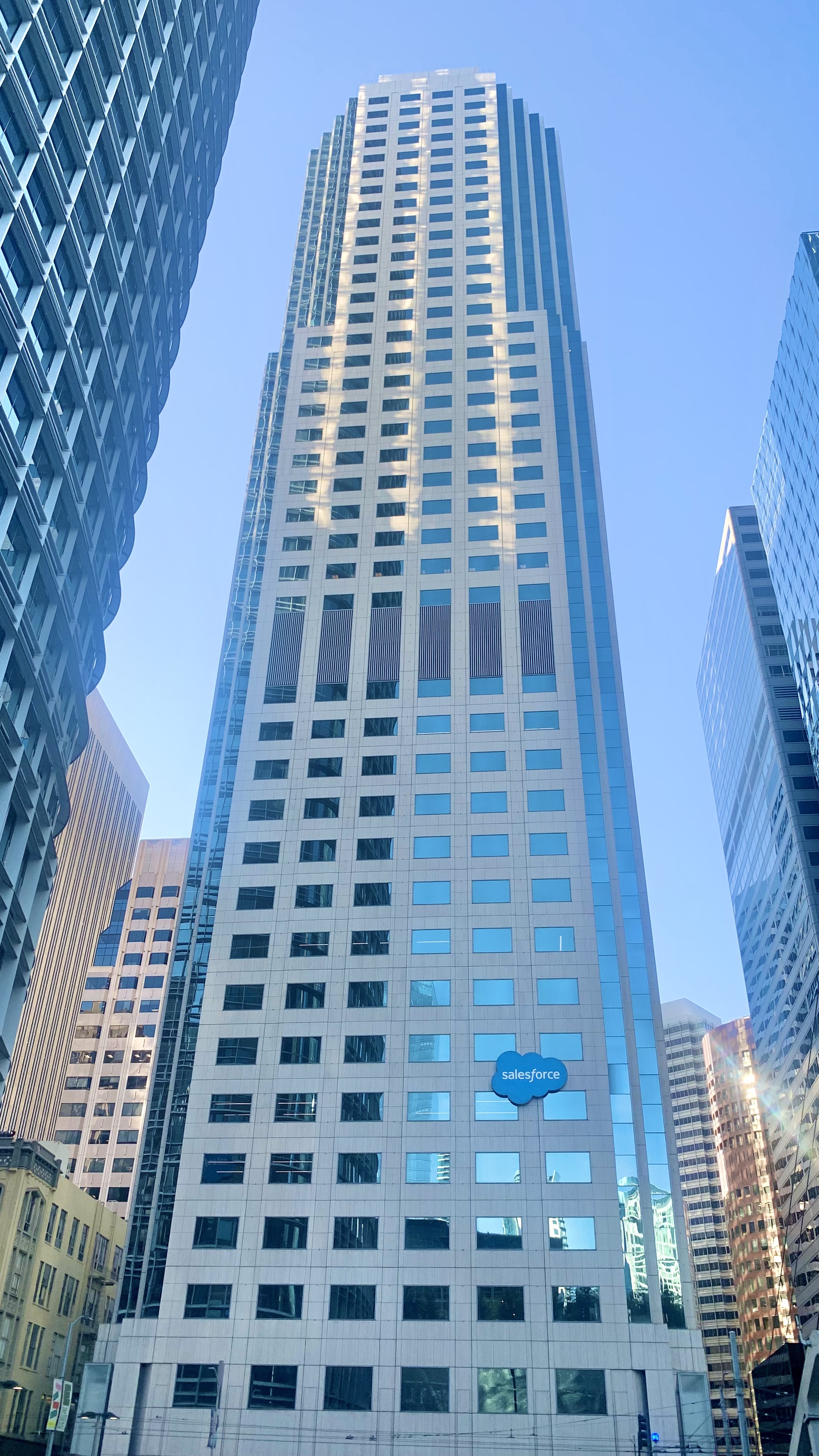
- Taken from Salesforce Tower in April 2021

- Location within San Francisco Salesforce West (California) Salesforce West (the United States)

General information
- Type: Commercial offices
- Location: 50 Fremont Street; San Francisco, California
- Coordinates: 37.790472°N 122.39725°W
- Construction started: 1983
- Completed: 1985
- Owner: Salesforce.com
- Management: Cushman & Wakefield

Height
- Roof: 183 m (600 ft)

Technical details
- Floor count: 43
- Floor area: 817,412 sq ft (75,940.1 m^{2})
- Lifts/elevators: 21

Design and construction
- Architect: Skidmore, Owings & Merrill
- Structural engineer: Skidmore, Owings & Merrill

Other information
- Parking: 220

Salesforce West, also known by its address 50 Fremont Center, is a 43-story, 183 m (600 ft) high-rise office building completed in 1985 at Fremont and Mission Streets on the boundary of the financial district and SoMa of San Francisco, California. The stepped-back facade design of the building resembles Eliel Saarinen's Tribune Tower design.

== History ==
50 Fremont Street was developed and owned by Fremont Properties who sold the building in 2000, which was later purchased by Hines Interests Limited Partnership, who in turn sold the property to TIAA-CREF in late 2004. Hines provided property management for this building until February 12, 2015. The building's design, by Skidmore, Owings & Merrill, includes stepped-back vertical bays at each corner, rising to a building crown that evokes the design of historic Art Deco skyscrapers.

In January 2012, Salesforce announced that it signed an 18-year lease to occupy 400,000 square feet (37,000 m^{2}) for US$339 million. In November 2014, Salesforce agreed to purchase the tower from TIAA-CREF.

Salesforce completed its purchase of the building for $637.8 million from TIAA-CREF in 2015, according to public records. Salesforce rebranded the property as Salesforce West at 50 Fremont Street, part of their urban campus plan that includes Salesforce East at 350 Mission Street and Salesforce Tower at 415 Mission Street.

As of May 2023, during what the San Francisco Chronicle described as "Downtown San Francisco['s] worst office vacancy crisis on record," 50 Freemont Street had a vacancy rate of 89.9%.

== Tenants ==
- Salesforce.com
- Mellon Capital Management
- Baker Tilly
- City National Bank
- Univision

== See also ==
- List of tallest buildings in San Francisco
