= Phantom debt =

Phantom debt or zombie debt is a debt that is old, defaulted, or not owed and is somehow still being pursued for collection to be paid by the presumed debtor. It generally refers to debt that is more than 3 years old, is long forgotten about or belonged to someone else – like someone with the same name or a deceased parent. The amount owed can grow to hundreds or thousands of dollars more than what was originally owed. An example of this is from George Lovelock. George missed an 11 cent Verizon bill and seven years later it had grown to $4,000.00.

Sometimes it was never owed, was owed by a deceased parent, or that was previously owed by the presumed debtor, but was previously paid in full, settled, discharged via bankruptcy or a dismissed court case, is beyond the statute of limitations, or is otherwise not legally collectible, but that a collection agency or other similar service is aggressively attempting to collect, often fraudulently.

While the concept of phantom debt is quite old, it has gotten a lot of attention since the 1990s.

Very often, collectors of phantom debt use intimidating, abusive, or otherwise illegal tactics in an attempt to collect phantom debt that include frequent phone calls, calls to the victim's place of employment, or threats of scary consequences against the victim that sometimes include arrest and/or criminal prosecution. In the United States, such tactics violate the Fair Debt Collection Practices Act. In a 2020 final rule implementing the act, the Consumer Financial Protection Bureau prohibited debt collectors from suing or threatening to sue consumers to collect time-barred debt, meaning debt for which the statute of limitations has passed.

The source of phantom debt may be from collectors who buy the debt from other collectors for pennies on the dollar, some of which take action that is not legal in order to collect that debt. Unlawful techniques used include suing or threatening to sue, reaging the debt on the victim's credit report to circumvent limits on reporting, or falsely promising to remove a negative credit report entry in exchange for a partial payment.
