= All in with Cam Newton =

American reality television series

- Genre: Reality
- Presented by: Cam Newton
- Country of origin: United States
- Original language: English
- No. of seasons: 1
- No. of episodes: 20

Production
- Executive producers: Casey Kriley; Benjamin Mack
- Running time: 22 minutes
- Production companies: Iconic Saga; Magical Elves; Nickelodeon Productions

Original release
- Network: Nickelodeon
- Release: June 3 – November 16, 2016

All in with Cam Newton is an American-Welsh reality television series hosted by former Carolina Panthers star quarterback, Cam Newton. It premiered on June 3, 2016, on Nickelodeon.

== Premise ==
Newton helps kids pursue their dreams along with field experts.

The show has had special appearances from people such as Lisa Leslie, Tom Kenny, Sutton Foster and Michelle Obama.

== Episodes ==
No.	Guest "All in with..."	Original release date	Prod. code	Viewers (millions)
1	"All in with Kaden and Soleil"	June 3, 2016	102	1.08
Cam rides with BMX hopeful Kaden as he learns from Mat Hoffman, then Cam checks in with aspiring veterinarian Soleil at a vet and a farm.
2	"All in with Jackson and Ajnai"	June 10, 2016	101	0.85
Cam meets future weatherman Jackson and gets some tips from meteorologist Jackie Johnson, then Cam plays basketball with a girl named Ajnai and former WNBA player Lisa Leslie.
3	"All in with Alaysia and Jack"	June 17, 2016	104	0.98
Cam meets Alaysia, who dreams of being the first female in the NFL, then Kenny Wormald advises a boy named Jack on becoming a professional performer.
4	"All in with Kayla and Caden"	June 24, 2016	106	0.92
Kayla is inspired to be a Tae Kwon Do master someday but for now wants to lean how to break two boards with one foot. Cam also gets in on the fun of breaking boards. Last Cam takes Caden who wants to be sports announcer in the future, to go see retired NHL player and current Los Angeles Kings radio color commentator, Daryl Evans who gives him some tips. Caden gets to practice what he learns during the UCLA Bruins' hockey team practice, and interviews Cam.
5	"All in with Grant and Tori"	July 8, 2016	105	0.89
Cam helps snake enthusiast Grant shoot his first web show, then Tori, a girl with a bright future sings along with Broadway star Sutton Foster.
6	"All in with Josh"	July 15, 2016	107	0.98
Cam meets up with aspiring animator Josh to see what he has drawn, before taking him to Nickelodeon Animation Studios. Cam and Josh participate in a voice-over session with Tom Kenny and Bill Fagerbakke, then Josh helps Chris Savino complete a scene for his series The Loud House, and finally, Cam and Josh meet Butch Hartman. Cam and Josh create some drawings with Butch, who teaches Josh how to draw hands (which was difficult for him) before animating his drawings.
7	"All in with Tarra"	July 22, 2016	113	0.93
With some help from Olympic gold medalist Dominique Dawes, Cam helps aspiring gymnast Tarra realize her dream of becoming an Olympian.
8	"All in with Rosie"	July 29, 2016	117	0.93
Ten year old Rosie is a young girl who has dreams of becoming President of the United States when she gets older, so Cam takes her to the White House to talk with First Lady Michelle Obama.
9	"All in with Isabella and Xander"	August 5, 2016	108	0.85
10	"All in with Caleb and Piper"	August 12, 2016	112	1.04
11	"All in with Kamarie"	September 9, 2016	116	0.75
12	"All in with Hannah and Phoenix"	September 16, 2016	111	0.75
13	"All in with O'Malley and Elise"	September 23, 2016	114	0.80
14	"All in with Emerson and Zach"	September 30, 2016	110	0.62
15	"All in with Jake"	October 7, 2016	103	0.73
16	"All in with Goldie and Jahan"	October 19, 2016	120	0.94
17	"All in with Sofie and Jiyah"	October 26, 2016	119	0.89
Note: An episode of The Thundermans, "A Hero Is Born", can be seen.
18	"All in with Claire and Chase"	November 2, 2016	115	1.01
19	"All in with G.G. and Brooke"	November 9, 2016	109	1.06
20	"All in with Ryan and Elisabeth"	November 16, 2016	118	0.98

== See also ==
- Jagger Eaton's Mega Life
