= Killing Fields (TV series) =

American TV series

- Country of origin: United States
- Original language: English
- No. of seasons: 2
- No. of episodes: 14

Production
- Executive producers: Barry Levinson; Tom Fontana; Rebecca Toth Diefenbach; Valerie Haselton Drescher; Lucilla D'Agostino; Denise Contis; Joseph Schneier
- Production company: Sirens Media
- Budget: 3 Million

Original release
- Network: Discovery Channel
- Release: January 6, 2016: February 22, 2017

Killing Fields is a cold case television series which premiered in 2016 on Discovery Channel.

== About the Show ==
In 2016, the Discovery Channel began a series called "Killing Fields" about a cold case in Louisiana. The show follows the investigators in real time as they try to solve the crime, which took place in June 1997. This is the first true crime series developed by Discovery. The show is executive produced by Barry Levinson and Tom Fontana among others.

== The Crime ==
In June 1997 in Baton Rouge, Louisiana, Eugenie Boisfontaine disappeared. Her body was found three months later in Bayou Manchac in nearby Iberville Parish, 15 miles south of Baton Rouge. Her head had blunt force trauma. Was it a singular murder or from a string of serial murders in the area? (There were 60 cases of missing and murdered women in the area during that time period and several serial murderers lived in nearby Baton Rouge.)

Detective Rodie Sanchez was the first investigator assigned to the case in 1997. Because he could never stop thinking about it, he came out of retirement to try to solve the crime. Detective Aubrey St. Angelo is a young detective who is helping Sanchez on the case. His father worked with Sanchez for many years before he retired. Both detectives are joined by many other detectives in the Iberville Parish Sheriff's office. Suspects during the investigation featured in the show were: Derrick Todd Lee, also known as the Baton Rouge Serial Killer, an unidentified male named Robert that Eugenie may have dated at the time of her murder and Michael Schmidt, her ex-husband.

== Response ==
The series opened to strong numbers. On February 2, 2016, Discovery Channel ordered a minimum of 6 more episodes.

== Episodes ==
=== Season 1 (2016) ===
No. overall	No. in season	Title	Directed by	Written by	Original release date	Prod. code
1	1	"A Body in the Bayou"	Unknown	Unknown	January 6, 2016	N/A
A cold case in Louisiana is investigated by a retired detective in the series opener of crimes where science and technology are used to examine and resolve the mysteries.
2	2	"Buried Secrets"	Unknown	Unknown	January 13, 2016	N/A
Detectives from Iberville Parish Sheriff's Office utilize technology to investigate DNA evidence from the crime scene.
3	3	"The Last Witness"	Unknown	Unknown	January 20, 2016	N/A
Rodie and Aubrey search for witnesses who may have seen the victim before her death; get a glimpse into Rodie Sanchez and Aubrey St. Angelo's lives.
4	4	"The Manhunt"	Unknown	Unknown	January 27, 2016	N/A
The detectives use cutting edge DNA technology to identify Eugenie's killer.
5	5	"Family Matters"	Unknown	Unknown	February 3, 2016	N/A
Aubrey interviews a convicted felon while following up on a tip; Rodie attempts to talk with Eugenie's ex-husband, Michael Schmidt, while rekindling his relationship with his family.
6	6	"Judgment Day"	Unknown	Unknown	February 10, 2016	N/A
In the Season 1 finale, Detectives narrow their focus and obtain a subpoena for a possible lead in this homicide investigation.
6.5	6.5	"The Case Continues (Special)"	Unknown	Unknown	February 17, 2016	N/A

=== Season 2 (2017) ===
No. overall	No. in season	Title	Directed by	Written by	Original release date	Prod. code
7	1	"The Hunt Continues"	Unknown	Unknown	January 4, 2017	N/A
The detectives continue to investigate the homicide case of Eugenie Boisfontaine, and comb through evidence in search of a motive.
8	2	"The Body in the Barrel"	Unknown	Unknown	January 11, 2017	N/A
Rodie works on the unsolved killing of Eugenie Boisfontaine, while he prepares to investigate a second cold case that involves a young black man, who went missing in 1991.
9	3	"Smoking Gun"	Unknown	Unknown	January 18, 2017	N/A
Detectives continue searching for physical evidence related to the unidentified body in the barrel, while awaiting DNA results from a tooth found on the corpse.
10	4	"The Search Warrant"	Unknown	Unknown	January 25, 2017	N/A
The detectives look for physical evidence that links Tommy Francise to the murder of Curtis Smith, as they continue their investigation with only a confession.
11	5	"The Raid"	Unknown	Unknown	February 1, 2017	N/A
With a search warrant in hand, the sheriff's office gears up to serve the warrant and search Tommy's home.
12	6	"Scene of the Crime"	Unknown	Unknown	February 8, 2017	N/A
In 2002, a murderer strikes George Barrett, one of Detective Rodie Sanchez's confidential informants, dead in his home, and Rodie suspects George's employer, Tommy Francise.
13	7	"The Takedown"	Unknown	Unknown	February 15, 2017	N/A
The team feels confident that they have enough evidence to finally make an arrest and put Tommy Francise behind bars as they prepare and present their case to the DA's office.
14	8	"The Last Stand"	Unknown	Unknown	February 22, 2017	N/A
