= Through the Wormhole =

American science documentary television series

- Genre: Science documentary
- Presented by: Morgan Freeman
- Starring: Sean Carroll; Michio Kaku
- Narrated by: Morgan Freeman
- Theme music composer: Hans Zimmer
- Composers: Jacob Shea; Hans Zimmer
- Country of origin: United States
- Original language: English
- No. of seasons: 8
- No. of episodes: 62

Production
- Executive producers: Bernadette McDaid; Deborah Adler Myers; James Younger; Lori McCreary; Morgan Freeman; Rocky Collins; Tracy Mercer
- Cinematography: David Baillie
- Running time: 44 minutes
- Production companies: Revelations Entertainment; The Incubator

Original release
- Network: Science Channel
- Release: June 9, 2010 – May 16, 2017

Through the Wormhole is an American science documentary television series narrated and hosted by American actor Morgan Freeman. It began airing on Science Channel in the United States on June 9, 2010. The series concluded its run on May 16, 2017. 62 episodes were produced.

== Production ==
=== Development ===
The Science Channel has been highlighting what VP of Production Bernadette McDaid calls the "Rock Stars of Science" and physics outreach such as Michio Kaku and Brian Cox. "We wanted to merge our 'Rock Stars of Science' ... with the superstars of pop culture." When Science general manager Deborah Myers heard that Morgan Freeman was very interested in things to do with the universe and space and "asks the big philosophical questions", she approached Freeman and his producer and proposed making a series together.

== Episodes ==
=== Series overview ===
Season	Episodes	Originally released	
Season	Episodes	First released	Last released
1	8	June 9, 2010	July 28, 2010
2	10	June 8, 2011	August 3, 2011
3	10	March 6, 2012	August 8, 2012
4	10	March 20, 2013	July 31, 2013
5	10	March 5, 2014	July 23, 2014
6	6	April 29, 2015	June 3, 2015
7	4	August 30, 2016	September 20, 2016
8	4	April 25, 2017	May 16, 2017

=== Season 1 (2010) ===
No. overall	No. in season	Title	Original release date
1	1	"Is There a Creator?"	June 9, 2010
It's perhaps the biggest, most controversial mystery in the cosmos. Did our Universe just come into being by random chance, or was it created by a God who nurtures and sustains all life? The latest science is showing that the four forces governing our universe are phenomenally finely tuned. So finely that it had led many to the conclusion that someone, or something, must have calibrated them. While skeptics hold that new findings are neither conclusive nor evidence of a divine creator, some cutting edge physicists are already positing who this God is: an alien gamester who's created our world as the ultimate SIM game for his own amusement. It's an answer as compelling as it is disconcerting.
2	2	"The Riddle of Black Holes"	June 16, 2010
They are the most powerful objects in the universe. Nothing, not even light, can escape the gravitational pull of a black hole. Astronomers now believe there are billions of them out in the cosmos, swallowing up planets, even entire stars in violent feeding frenzies. New theoretical research into the twisted reality of black holes suggests that three-dimensional space could be an illusion. That reality actually takes place on a two-dimensional hologram at the edge of the universe.
3	3	"Is Time Travel Possible?"	June 23, 2010
Einstein's Theory of Relativity says that time travel is perfectly possible — if you're going forward. Finding a way to travel backwards requires breaking the speed of light, which so far seems impossible. But now, strange-but-true phenomena such as quantum non-locality, where particles instantly teleport across vast distances, may give us a way to make the dream of traveling back and forth through time a reality. Step into a time machine and rewrite history, bring loved ones back to life, control our destinies. But if we succeed, what are the consequences of such freedom? Will we get trapped in a plethora of paradoxes and multiple universes that will destroy the fabric of the universe?
4	4	"What Happened Before the Beginning?"	June 30, 2010
Every cosmologist and astronomer agrees: our Universe is 13.7 billion years old. Using cutting-edge technology, scientists are now able to take a snapshot of the Universe a mere heartbeat after its birth. Armed with hypersensitive satellites, astronomers look back in time to the very moment of creation, when all the matter in the Universe exploded into existence. It is here that we uncover an unsolved mystery as old as time itself - if the Universe was born, where did it come from? Meet the leading scientists who have now discovered what they believe to be the origin of our Universe, and a window into the time before time. Features scientists Edwin Hubble, Martin Bojowald, Neil Turok and Paul Steinhardt, and treats of issues around the Big Bang, initial singularity, the string theory, the M-theory, dark energy and gravitational waves.
5	5	"How Did We Get Here?"	July 7, 2010
Everywhere we look, life exists in both the most hospitable of environments and in the most extreme. Yet we have only ever found life on our planet. How did the stuff of stars come together to create life as we know it? What do we really mean by 'life'? And will unlocking this mystery help us find life elsewhere? Features the research and ideas of geologist Stephen J Mojzsis, chemists Stanley Miller and Harold Urey and their student Jeffrey Bada, Jen Blank of a search for extraterrestrial intelligence project, biologist Jack Szostak, chemist John Sutherland, physicist Paul Davies and microbial geobiologist/biogeochemist Felisa Wolfe-Simon, and planetary scientist Ben Weiss. Tackles the Hadean period, shadow biospheres, a Winogradsky column, life among the toxic chemicals of Mono Lake, ALH84001 and life on Mars.
6	6	"Are We Alone?"	July 14, 2010
Aliens almost certainly do exist. So why haven't we yet met E.T.? It turns out we're only just developing instruments powerful enough to scan for them, and science sophisticated enough to know where to look. As a result, race is on to find the first intelligent aliens. But what would they look like, and how would they interact with us if we met? The answers may come to us sooner than we imagine, for one leading astronomer believes she may already have heard a hint of their first efforts to communicate. Featuring astrobiologist Lynn Rothschild of NASA Ames Research Center, astronomer Jill Tarter, physicist and SETI projects affiliate Paul Davies, astronomer Geoff Marcy and his student Paul Butler, and space scientist William Borucki. This episode talks about the Murchison meteorite, the Allen Telescope Array, 51 Pegasi b, and the Kepler Space Telescope mission.
7	7	"What Are We Really Made Of?"	July 21, 2010
Our understanding of the universe and the nature of reality itself has drastically changed over the last 100 years, and it's on the verge of another seismic shift. In a 17-mile-long tunnel buried 570 feet beneath the Franco-Swiss border, the world's largest and most powerful atom smasher, the Large Hadron Collider (LHC), is powering up. Its goal is nothing less than recreating the first instants of creation, when the universe was unimaginably hot and long-extinct forms of matter sizzled and cooled into stars, planets, and ultimately, us. These incredibly small and exotic particles hold the keys to the greatest mysteries of the universe. What we find could validate our long-held theories about how the world works and what we are made of. Or, all of our notions about the essence of what is real will fall apart. Features Argonne National Laboratory's Bob Stanek and the Advanced Photon Source, Ernest Rutherford's probe into the structure of the atom through M.I.T. professor Steve Nahn's use of the LHC, antimatter, particle physicist Frank Close, antimatter investigator Joel Fajans, the Bevatron particle accelerator, the particle zoo, Fermilab and its Tevatron, experimental physicist Leon Lederman, the weak force and radioactive decay, the strong force and the proton, photons and electromagnetic force, electroweak unification, the Standard Model, theoretical physicist Peter Higgs and the Higgs boson and force particle, CERN, the CMS and ATLAS detectors, and the LHC Quench incident.
8	8	"Beyond the Darkness"	July 28, 2010
What is the universe made of? If you answered stars, planets, gas and dust, you'd be dead wrong. Thirty years ago, scientists first realized that some unknown dark substance was affecting the way galaxies moved. Today, they think there must be five times as much dark matter as regular matter out there. But they have no idea what it is — only that it's not made of atoms, or any other matter we are familiar with. And Dark Matter is not the only strange substance in the Universe — a newly discovered force, called Dark Energy, seems to be pushing the very fabric of the cosmos apart.

=== Season 2 (2011) ===
No. overall	No. in season	Title	Original release date
9	1	"Is There Life After Death?"	June 8, 2011
In the premiere episode of the second season, Morgan Freeman dives deep into this provocative question that has mystified humans since the beginning of time. Modern physics and neuroscience are venturing into this once hallowed ground, and radically changing our ideas of life after death. Freeman serves as host to this polarized debate, where scientists and spiritualists attempt to define "what is consciousness", while cutting edge quantum mechanics could provide the answer to what happens when we die. Eben Alexander, Bruce Greyson, Stuart Hameroff, Giulio Tononi, Christof Koch, and Douglas Hofstadter are interviewed. The 21 grams experiment to determine the weight of the human soul is discussed. Next, Steve Potter's Hybrot is explained.
10	2	"Is There an Edge to the Universe?"	June 15, 2011
In 1543, Nicholas Copernicus proves that the Earth is not the center of the cosmos. The "after-glow" is the Big Bang from 13.7 billion years ago is called the cosmic microwave background (CMB), which is the supporting evidence that the "Big Bang" occurred. But since we can only see as far as light has traveled in that time, we can't actually make out the edge of the universe. After the Big Bang, the universe balloons up at an incredible rate in the process of inflation. Neil Cornish, a Montana State University professor, is interviewed. Archytas of ancient Greece is the first person known to have ponder the question of whether the universe has an edge. Janna Levin compares the shape of the universe to the 1979 Asteroids game. Jean-Pierre Luminet is interviewed. WMAP of NASA photographs the CMB (cosmic radiation) for five years. Glenn D. Starkman and Sasha Kashlinsky are interviewed. Dark flow is the attraction of matter in the universe in one direction. Laura Mersini-Houghton advances string theory to explain a multiverse structure from which our universe is born. Mersini-Houghton contends that one universe acts as the Great Attractor of another universe to cause the "dark flow."
11	3	"Does Time Really Exist?"	June 22, 2011
Einstein discovered that time is relative while Isaac Newton had thought of time as absolute. Time runs faster for astronauts than people on Earth; people on Earth experience time more slowly because they are closer to the gravitational field of the massive Earth. Studies have shown that for many people time can feel like it goes by faster as we age. In ancient Greece, Parmenides contended that motion is impossible. Likewise, it was argued that time is an illusion. Julian Barbour claims that the Wheeler–DeWitt equation supports his idea that time doesn't exist! The Wheeler–DeWitt equation doesn't depend on time. Contrarians contend that the Wheeler–DeWitt equation shows that one can't reconcile general relativity with quantum mechanics and that time is real. The Fermi Space Telescope will measure if the speed of a photon of light from 13 billion years ago is different from the speed of light now. Steve Weinstein posits that time may have more than one dimension although time is traditionally treated as a scalar quantity; the majority of physicists see time as a quantity with one dimension, though.: Interviewed experts: Roger W. Smith (watch designer), Lee Smolin, Sean M. Carroll, David Eagleman, Julian Barbour, Tim Maudlin, Steven Weinstein (philosopher).
12	4	"Are There More than Three Dimensions?"	June 29, 2011
Open strings attached to a pair of D-branes We move and live in three dimensions: length, width, and height. However, Einstein revealed what was once unimaginable: time is actually a dimension and linked with space itself. To reconcile the massive cosmic and minuscule quantum worlds, physicists are realizing four dimensions may not be enough. Tim Tait believes that a fourth dimension may explain the mystery of dark matter. Others are unraveling up to eleven dimensions. A hypercube can have 4 dimensions. Dark matter affects the way stars rotate around galaxies. In 2008, NASA launched the Fermi Space Telescope to pick up intense radiation known as gamma rays [gamma rays are much more energetic than X rays ] emitted by exploding stars. In addition, the Fermi Space Telescope is supposed to detect from the gamma rays from the photons of dark matter. As of 2011, no physicist has found any physical evidence of strings (which supposedly are vibrating strings that make up sub-atomic particles) at the Large Hadron Collider. However, torturous mathematical evidence has emerged of objects that make up the unseen strings; these strings interact with spacial planes knows as D-branes. Strings and their complementary D-branes are only shown to exist in complex mathematical exercises. Gravity is associated with closed strings. Within the paradigm of string theory, a graviton is not an elementary particle but a closed-loop string. Renate Loll believes that string theory "itself is wrong," Freeman narrates.: Interviewed experts: Susan R. Barry, Lisa Randall, Timothy M. P. Tait, Maria Spiropulu, Joseph Polchinski, Eric Adelberger (a winner of the 2021 Breakthrough Prize in Fundamental Physics at the University of Washington), Renate Loll.
13	5	"Is There a Sixth Sense?"	July 6, 2011
Can we perceive objects and events beyond the world detected by our five senses? The true limits of our human brain remain a scientific mystery. New studies in neuroscience are showing that our minds can really detect events and objects that our conscious selves know nothing about. Can we predict events in the future? Is there such a thing as a global consciousness? Could physical laws on the cusp of being discovered be at the root of all this? Blindsight has been studied. Schrödinger's cat is supposed to show that "nothing in this universe is certain until someone makes a measurement," narrates Freeman. Eugene Wigner argued that consciousness casuses collapse, necessary for existence. In the 1950s, Richard Feynman found "advanced wave" solutions to Maxwell's equations from the 1860s. Freeman narrates that matter traveling backwards in time may be proof of antimatter.: Interviewed experts: Beatrice de Gelder, David Chalmers, Roger D. Nelson, Rupert Sheldrake, Michael Persinger, Michio Kaku, Dean Radin, Daryl Bem.
14	6	"Are There Parallel Universes?"	unaired
Hubble's law illustrated pictorially. In the 1920s, Edwin Hubble found that galaxies are flying away from us at increasing speeds. Standford's particle accelator has been used to create miniature versions of the Big Bang; B mesons and anti-B mesons were collided by experimenters. In May 2011, Space Shuttle Endeavour delivered a giant particle detector called "AMS" to the International Space Station. The AMS will look for cosmic rays created billions of years ago from matter and anti-matter annihilating each other in the aftermath of the Big Bang.: Interviewed experts: Max Tegmark, Andrew N. Cleland, JoAnne L. Hewett, Andrei Linde, Paul Steinhardt, Nikodem Popławski.
15	7	"How Does the Universe Work?"	July 13, 2011
It was Einstein's famous unfinished project - to find one law that unites all of physics, and explain everything in the universe. It's still an unfinished project, and today hundreds of physicists from CERN to NASA to the Ivory Towers around the world are struggling to find this holy grail of science. When the Earth is closer to the Sun on January 4th, the rate of radioactive decay is faster. The pilot wave theory states that an electron is both a wave and a particle all of the times--not just when it is being observed. Freeman states that we can see is approximately 5 % of all the matter, dark matter accounts for another 23%, and lastly, dark energy accounts for the remaining 72% of all matter. At the time of this documentary in 2011, Clare Burrage was thinking that dark energy is a by-product of the chameleon particle.: Interviewed experts: Jere Jenkins, Ephraim Fischbach, Anton Zeilinger, Yves Couder, Antony Valentini, Petr Hořava (theorist), Clare Burrage, Max Tegmark.
16	8	"Can We Travel Faster Than Light?"	July 20, 2011
Negative energy needed to travel faster than light in the speculative idea of the Alcubierre warp drive is "something that many scientists aren't even sure exists," narrates Freeman. Freeman says a wormhole is a "rip in the fabric of space itself." However, wormholes may be a sci-fi fantasy. Leaving aside the huge quantities of the "exotic matter" of negative energy needed, Stephen Hsu has mathematically shown that any quantity of negative energy would be unstable and dangerous. Spectral lines function similar to bar codes in helping us identify the composition of a star based on the light emitted by the star being studied. The Keck Telescope in Hawaii is used to look at the stars in the northern sky. João Magueijo states that a variable speed of light can solve the homogeneity problem [that matter looks spread out evenly throughout the universe]; others believe cosmic inflation provides the answer. Cosmic strings are proposed pathways where the speed of light may be faster.: Interviewed experts: Sean M. Carroll, Miguel Alcubierre, Steve Lamoreaux, Stephen Hsu, Christopher Monroe, Steven Olmschenk, John Webb of the University of New South Wales in Sydney, João Magueijo.
17	9	"Can We Live Forever?"	July 27, 2011
Mitochondria function like engines in our bodies because they produce energy. Valter Longo at USC has extended the life of a yeast culture from 6 days to 11 weeks by removing the Ras2 and SCH9 genes. Aubrey de Gray believes that the accumulation of "garbage" in the lysosome of the cell causes aging. Greg Fahy has tried to preserve a rabbit kidney by freezing it. Short of preserving the whole human body, Olaf Sporns has worked to map the human brain in what he calls the connectome using diffusion imaging. In 1970, John Conway attempts to create an artificial life form (a computer program) that can "live" forever known as the "Game of Life". Instead of transistors, "quantum devices compute with individual atoms." Freeman goes on to state that perhaps humans will give up on human biological immortality but focus on "eternal artificial life." Clock of the Long Now is designed to last for 10,000 years.: Interviewed experts: Michio Kaku, Valter Longo, Aubrey de Grey, Christopher Voigt, Greg Fahy, Olaf Sporns, Vlatko Vedral, Frank J. Tipler.
18	10	"What Do Aliens Look Like?"	August 3, 2011
In 2009, NASA launched the Kepler space telescope (which has been de-activated in 2018); its mission was to detect the changes in the brightness of distant stars 3,000 light-years away from us. Freeman narrates (that as of 2011) around 300 Earth-like rocky planets orbiting distant non-Sun stars have been discovered by the Kepler Space Telescope. Sara Seager and William Bains have been studying the exoplanet GJ 1214b, a planet more than 40 light-years away, twice the size of the Earth, and signs of an atmosphere. Gliese 581d is about 20 light-years away from Earth in the constellation Libra; this planet might harbor "alien life." Its red star Gliese 581 generates half the heat of Earth's Sun. In 2008, NASA's EPOXI probe sent back images of Earth as our planets would appear to undiscovered alien astronomers. An astro-comb used to reduce "camera shake" to better see planets and stars many light-years away from the Earth.: Interviewed experts: Andrew H. Knoll, Michael LaBarbera of the University of Chicago, Dimitar Sasselov, Diana Valencia, Sara Seager, Seth Shostak of SETI Institute.

=== Season 3 (2012) ===
No. overall	No. in season	Title	Original release date
19	1	"Will We Survive First Contact?"	March 6, 2012
Mankind longs for proof that we are not alone in the universe, but the moment of first contact will certainly mean the end of the world as we know it. Whether that is a bad thing for humanity or the start of a great future is uncertain. Michio Kaku says,"Electromagnetic radiation is the fastest, most effective way to communicate between stars." An ion engine is based on the repulsion of like charges to create thrust; the Dawn spacecraft was launched by NASA using the principle of ion thruster. The closest star (other than the Sun), Proxima Centauri, is about 25 trillion miles away. Paul Davis thinks that junk DNA is the "perfect hiding place" (as Morgan Freeman puts it) for a coded message from alien creatures--if they exist. Mike Callahan has looked at carbonaceous chondrites (space rocks).: Interviewed experts: Charles S. Cockell, Michio Kaku, Laurance Doyle, John Brophy at Jet Propulsion Laboratory, James Kakalios, Paul Davies, Mike Callahan.; Featured musicians: ArcAttack band members play music using Tesla coils.
20	2	"Is There a Superior Race?"	June 6, 2012
Heliconius butterflies do not all look the same even within ones species--they have different wing colors. These butterflies have the same adaptive poison to ward off predatory birds. Heliconius butterflies of different wing colors face no barriers to mating like humans. The Human Genome Project was completed in the year 2000 [according to this documentary]. Bill Clinton declares that all human races are 99.9% the same. Human and chimpanzee genomes differ by about 3%. John Hawks says that individuals with attention and focus problems are more likely to have more DRD4 genes. Stanley Coren has determined that the Border Collie is a very intelligent dog breed. Linda Gottfredson has found that even siblings have different levels of intelligence.: Interviewed experts: Andrew Brower, John D. Hawks, Stanley Coren, Linda Gottfredson, Simon Laughlin, Peter Ward (paleontologist), Alex Pentland.
21	3	"Is The Universe Alive?"	June 13, 2012
An underlying feature of life is metabolism which is using energy to drive the system. According to Stephon Alexander, there was a previous universe which collapsed and then bounced out into a revived universe; this Big Bounce is part of a never-ending cycle of contraction and expansion. In 2012, Alexander stated that a neutrino can have a repulsive force that prevents crunching into a singularity. The existence of animals and plants is because of a fine-tuned universe. Lee Smolin proposed cosmological natural selection as the answer for how the universe is fine-tuned to accommodate the life of humans.: Interviewed experts: Jürgen Schmidhuber, Geoffrey West, Stephon Alexander, Lee Smolin, Seth Lloyd, Robert Lanza.
22	4	"What Makes Us Who We Are?"	June 20, 2012
The mirror stage occurs when we are toddlers in the journey of self discovery. The hippocampus "is critical to the storage of memory," as Morgan Freeman puts it. PKM zeta is a molecule that "jumps into action when we are forming new memories." ζ-inhibitory peptide (ZIP) inhibits protein kinase Mζ (PKM ζ). Alain Brunet personally experienced the 1989 École Polytechnique massacre in Canada. Propranolol is a β blocker. Steve Furber has designed SpiNNaker chips to model the activities of a simple brain.: Interviewed experts: Alison Gopnik, Donna Rose Addis, Tali Sharot, Micah Edelson of Weizmann Institute of Science, Yuki Kamitani, André Fenton, Alain Brunet on neuroplasticity (McGill University's Department of Psychiatry, Dr. Alain Brunet investigates the impact of trauma exposure), Steve Furber.
23	5	"What is Nothing?"	June 27, 2012
Morgan Freeman narrates that supersymmetry is the idea that "every particle has a mirror-image particle." Electrons should have supersymmetric selectrons, and quarks should have squarks. At the time of the airing of this episode, the LHC had seen no sign of supersymmetric particles. Gerard 't Hooft believes in the conservation of information which states that nothing can be removed from the universe. Katie Freese believes that dark matter does not have electric charge. Gabriele Veneziano asserts a "dilaton field"―as opposed to a void―filled the universe before the Big Bang 14 billion years ago.: Interviewed experts: Slava Turyshev, Frank Close, Neal Weiner at New York University, Max Tegmark, Gerard 't Hooft, Katherine Freese, Gabriele Veneziano.
24	6	"Can We Resurrect The Dead?"	July 11, 2012
In this episode, John Elefteriades operates on the heart of a "dead" patient whose brain is preserved in a cold-temperature blood in a 38-minute time window. Lance Becker states that the death process or the decay process "is slowed down in the cold setting. When the temperature comes down, the cells don't need as much oxygen. They don't metabolize as much." In 2001, Robert Lanza used frozen cells to resurrect an extinct Southeast Asian ox called a gaur using an American cow as a surrogate mother. In the United States, it is difficult to obtain funding for research into human cloning.: Interviewed experts: John Elefteriades, Lance Becker, Robert Lanza, Doris Taylor at the University of Minnesota when this episode was produced, Cathal Gurrin, Kenneth Hayworth, President and Co-Founder of the Brain Preservation Foundation, Hiroshi Ishiguro.
25	7	"Can We Eliminate Evil?"	July 18, 2012
Paul Bloom tells Morgan Freeman that very early in life, everyone has a moral sense. Bloom further elaborates that if a person is brought up in a culture that rewards bad behavior, then "your sense of empathy can be blunted." The indiscriminate killings of Charles Whitman is discussed. Freeman reviews the importance of willpower.: Interviewed experts: Christian Keysers, Karen Wynn, Paul Bloom (psychologist), David Eagleman, James H. Fallon, Christian Ruff is Full Professor of Neuroeconomics and Decision Neuroscience at the Department of Economics of the University of Zurich, Owen D. Jones, Steven Pinker.
26	8	"Mysteries of the Subconscious"	July 25, 2012
The human brain uses the default mode network when we are sub-consciously performing tasks. The anterior cingulate cortex (ACC) buzzes with activity when an individual feels that they are about to make an error. Honest signaling operates at the sub-conscious level. Monks in Tibet practice a form of meditation called "tummo". Morgan Freeman reviews transcranial direct current stimulation (tDCS).: Interviewed experts: Marcus Raichle, Henrik Ehrsson, Alex Pentland, Herbert Benson, Allan Snyder, Michael Weisend.
27	9	"Will Eternity End?"	August 1, 2012
Morgan Freeman explains that the Amondawa tribe in the Brazilian state of Rondônia "does not live by a calendar, and they don't use clocks." "Dark energy" was discovered in 1998. Andrew Strominger views time as a hologram. Holograms are "2-dimensional plates" from which a third dimension of space appears to emerge.: Interviewed experts: Vera Da Silva Sinha, Chris Sinha, Fotini Markopoulou-Kalamara, Sean M. Carroll, Raphael Bousso, Andrew Strominger, Jeff Tollaksen at Chapman University, Yakir Aharonov, Tom Banks (physicist).
28	10	"Did We Invent God?"	August 8, 2012
The temporoparietal junction (TPJ) "is the brain's navigator." Freeman explains that "people perform religious rituals, Buddhists chant, Hindus draw shapes in chalk, and Christians baptize." On the other hand, Danny Povinelli's experiments have led him to conclude "chimps don't have rituals of any kind." Andy Newberg has studied the brain activity of praying subjects using SPECT scans in which he injects his subject with a radioactive liquid.: Interviewed experts: Jesse Bering, Bruce Hood (psychologist), Olaf Blanke, Jennifer Whitson, Daniel Povinelli, Andrew B. Newberg.

=== Season 4 (2013) ===
No. overall	No. in season	Title	Original release date
29	1	"Is There a God Particle?"	March 20, 2013
Examining the 2012 discovery of a subatomic particle believed to be the Higgs boson, or "God particle," which could explain how matter came to exist in the universe. Scientists explore the fundamental nature of the Higgs boson and how it gives mass to matter. Morgan Freeman explains that there are two basic types of elementary particles: (1) fermions which are "a group of massive particles that carry matter," and (2) bosons which are "massless particles that carry force." The commentators explain that the Higgs field converts massless into massive particles. The LHC in Geneva, Switzerland is 17 miles long. Particle are accelerated LHC. Next, more massive particles are created as a result of the collision of smaller particles. Freeman explains, "The protons that are smashed together at the LHC...are filled with particles called quarks and gluons." When protons collide, thousands of new particles fly off. The smaller-than-proton particles that shoot out of the collision are like "shattered glass." In the aftermath of proton collisions, physicists at the LHC found Higgs bosons in July 2012. Freeman elaborates that the Higgs boson doesn't help us understand "dark matter." Afterwards, he discusses the "hierarchy problem" in relation to the Higgs boson. Freeman says that the W and Z bosons are "extremely heavy." Francesco Sannino and his colleague believe that the Higgs boson is governed by something even more fundamental which they call the "technicolor force". Ordinary quarks (a type of fermion) in different arrangements make either protons or neutron depending on the arrangement. Howard Georgi has hypothesized the existence of "unparticles".: Interviewed experts: Patrick Fox of Fermilab in Batavia, Illinois; Dan Hooper, Lyn Evans, Joseph Incandela, John Ellis (physicist), Albert De Roeck, Francesco Sannino, Howard Georgi.
30	2	"When Does Life Begin?"	June 5, 2013
Hugo Lagercrantz tells Morgan Freeman that fishes can't experience the psychological aspects of pain because they lack thalamocortical connections. Lagercrantz says, "Thalamocortical connections are crucial for consciousness." Freeman interviews experts regarding the transition from non-living to living forms of life.: Interviewed experts: Maureen L. Condic, Hilary Gammill at the Fred Hutchinson Cancer Research Center, Hugo Lagercrantz, Philippe Rochat (psychologist) at Emory University, Eugene Izhikevich and daughter Katherine Izhikevich, Martin Hanczyc, Francis Heylighen at the Free University of Brussels.
31	3	"Can We Survive the Death of the Sun?"	June 12, 2013
The Sun is expected to run out of hydrogen fuel in 5 billion years! Afterwards, it is expected to tap into helium as a fuel source. Freeman narrates that at that point, the Sun will expand, "it will swallow Mercury." Christopher McKay proposes migrating to the planet Mars if the Earth gets too hot. Freeman narrates,"Mars will survive even after the Earth is burned to a crisp." Perfluorocarbons or PFCs will need to be used to terraform Mars. After the Sun burns helium for 2 billion years, it collapses into a white dwarf star. National Ignition Facility (NIF) is the world's most energetic laser. Freeman explains that Shawn Westmoreland has proposed "tethering a tiny black hole to a spaceship" to propel the spaceship in order to allow inter-stellar travel. At the time of this documentary, the hottest temperature can be reached inside the LHC in Switzerland; the temperature of smashing particles at the LHC can get a 100,000 times hotter than the center of the Sun.: Interviewed experts: Peter Schroeder of the University of Guanajuato in Mexico, Gregory P. Laughlin, Christopher McKay, Ed Moses (physicist) at the Lawrence Livermore National Laboratory, Shawn Westmoreland, Anthony Aguirre, Michio Kaku.
32	4	"How Do Aliens Think?"	June 19, 2013
To learn how an alien mind might think, the researching duo Consuelo De Moraes and Mark Mescher have researched the behavior of a parasitic vine known as Cuscuta pentagona. Cuscuta neither have roots nor photosynthesize; instead the Cuscuta attach to a host plant. Mike D'Zmura at the University of California, Irvine has been researching the brain–computer interface (BCI). He has been looking for efference copies in his subjects' minds.: Interviewed experts: Consuelo De Moraes at ETH Zurich, Mark Mescher at ETH Zurich, Saskia Nagel at RWTH Aachen University, Nigel R. Franks, James Marshall, David Edelman (a neuroscientist who is the son of Gerald Edelman), Simon M. Kirby, Michael D'Zmura, Lisa Feldman Barrett .
33	5	"Will Sex Become Extinct?"	June 26, 2013
In Australia, Nick Otway created an artificial womb for the wobbegong shark. Golden Orb Weaving Spiders produce extremely strong silk webs.: Interviewed experts: Jenny Graves, Levi Morran, Renee Reijo Pera, Nick Otway (a fisheries biologist), Frans de Waal, Douglass Turnbull, biology professor Randy Lewis.
34	6	"Can Our Minds Be Hacked?"	July 3, 2013
Marc Salem claims to reads people's minds by closely observing their body language; he calls this information leakage. Alpha waves show mental concentration while theta waves are indicative of relaxation. Freeman explains that the fusiform gyrus lights up whenever we see color.: Interviewed experts: Marc Salem, Augie Nieto, Philip Low (iBrain inventor and founder of Neurovigil, a company that does innovative EEG analysis), Jack Gallant is Chancellor's Professor of Psychology at the University of California at Berkeley, Shinji Nishimoto, Alex Huth, Chris Berka, Chris Oosterlinck (professional archer), David Spiegel, Ilana Hairston in Tel Aviv, Edward Boyden.
35	7	"Are Robots the Future of Human Evolution?"	July 10, 2013
We are in the midst of a revolution so insidious we can't even see it. From our telephones to our vacuum cleaners to our cars, we have robots that live and work beside us. And now we're designing them to think for themselves, giving them the power to learn to move on their own. RoboCup is an international soccer championship.: Interviewed experts: Daniel Wolpert, Josh Bongard, Hod Lipson, Pentti Haikonen (Artificial consciousness#Haikonen's cognitive architecture), Michael Schmidt, Dennis Hong, Daniel Lee at the University of Pennsylvania, Yoshiyuki Sankai.
36	8	"Is Reality Real?"	July 17, 2013
A-modal completion is the ability of our brains to fill in the missing pieces of objects that see partially. Tali Sharot tells Morgan Freeman that about 80% of us have developed a reality distortion mechanism to over-estimate positive outcomes. Sharot has written her book The Optimism Bias to explore this optimistic outlook. The holographic principle states that the 3-dimensional reality may in fact be 2-dimensional.: Interviewed experts: Lawrence D. Rosenblum (psychologist at University of California, Riverside), David Gabbay, Charles M. Falco, Jim Baggott, Tali Sharot, Steven Nahn, David Tong (physicist), Jan Westerhoff.
37	9	"Do We Have Free Will?"	July 24, 2013
The Ancient Greeks believe that our fates are chosen by the Greek gods. Morgan Freeman says that some scientist see the Buddhist teaching about Anattā (non-self) to mean that the mind and body aren't separate. Retrocausality means that future affects the past. In The Astonishing Hypothesis, Francis Crick states that we are the behavior of our assembled cells.: Interviewed experts: Dennis Shaffer at Ohio State University, John-Dylan Haynes, Michael Gazzaniga, Sean Gourley at Quid Inc., Gerard 't Hooft (recurring guest), Ken Wharton at San Jose State University, Jonathan Schooler.
38	10	"Did God Create Evolution?"	July 31, 2013
Morgan Freeman narrates that the prevailing belief among biologists is that "life created itself about 4,000,000,000 (4 billion) years ago." Freeman's first two guests, Michael Behe and John Long, present opposing views about biological evolution. Michael Behe champions intelligent design (ID). Behe doesn't believe that "random mutation" can explain biological evolution. For example, he believes that the bacterial flagellum (tail) can't be explained by evolution alone. The ancestors of vertebrates had notochords. John Long discusses the missing links. About 500,000,000 (500 million) years ago, plants and fungi colonized land. John Long asserts that selection pressure drove the evolution of vertebrae as opposed to one God (male deity) championed by self-professed Christian Michael Behe. DNA polymerase makes copies of DNA. RNA is made of a sugar called ribose (with 5 carbons). Threose nucleic acid (TNA) [with 4 carbons] is simpler than ribose.: Interviewed experts: Michael Behe, John H. Long, Jr. at Vassar College, Scott Aaronson at the MIT Stata Center, John Chaput, Adrian Bejan, George F. R. Ellis, Paul J. Zak.

=== Season 5 (2014) ===
No. overall	No. in season	Title	Original release date
39	1	"Is God an Alien Concept?"	March 5, 2014
Is the same one God worshipped in other worlds, across the cosmos? How might alien deities differ from our own? The answer may lie buried on Earth. Animal behaviorists are testing elephants and finding them capable of having spiritual thoughts. Artificial intelligence researchers are building enlightened robots that contemplate the divine. Meanwhile, cosmologists are looking for universal equations that could replace God. Have advanced aliens discovered everything there is to know about the universe? Or are they looking to a higher power for answers? The Norse polytheist ancestors of Max Tegmark saw the electrical ionization of air molecules (lightning) as Thor, the thunder god, battling against the Frost giants with his hammer. Gödel's incompleteness theorems state that there is no system that can proves every assertion within itself.: Interviewed experts: Deborah Kelemen, Joshua Plotnik, Kevin Rounding, Daniel M. Abrams at Northwestern University, Ben Goertzel, Max Tegmark (recurring guest), Marcelo Gleiser.
40	2	"Is Luck Real?"	March 12, 2014
Do you make your own luck, or does luck make you? Some scientists believe luck is strictly a matter of statistics and probabilities…but others believe unseen forces are at work, and randomness is built into every particle of the universe. We'll find luck, good and bad, in casinos, basketball courts, genetics labs and the subatomic world. How much does the genetic lottery rule your fate? Are lucky streaks and unfortunate accidents merely our own minds fooling us? It's a scientific journey that will radically revise your understanding of the laws of nature and the workings of the human brain. A basketball player who has a string of successes may be said to have hot hands. A micromort is a small unit of death. The collapse of the wave function states that the location of an elementary particle is determined once we take measurements. As a result, when we take measurements, then the same particle can't be in two places at the same time!: Interviewed experts: Sally Linkenauger at Lancaster University, Jonathan “Jay” Koehler at the Northwestern University Pritzker School of Law, Tom Griffiths (cognitive scientist), David Spiegelhalter, Michael Elowitz, Andreas Albrecht (cosmologist), Max Tegmark (recurring guest).
41	3	"Is Poverty Genetic?"	June 4, 2014
Morgan Freeman narrates that growing up in extreme poverty slows the growth of the hippocampus which is important for learning and memory.: Interviewed experts: Eric Turkheimer, Martha Farah, Quamrul H. Ashraf, Oded Galor, Victor M. Yakovenko, Tracy Mincer at Woods Hole Oceanographic Institution, Sarah Brosnan, Jennifer Jacquet.
42	4	"How to Collapse a Superpower"	June 11, 2014
The GPS navigation system depends on the synchronization of all the satellites at the same time. Scientists around the world are dealing with new threats such as body hacking, Trojan horse viruses, and brain-damaging Internet addiction. But what if the ultimate threat isn't an attack on technology, but the technology? Could the final superpower be the disembodied mind of the Internet itself? Julius Caesar used the Caesar cipher for clandestine communication. The one-time pad is more complex.: Interviewed experts: Judah Levine at the National Institute of Standards and Technology (NIST), Sébastien Marcel at the Idiap Research Institute, Mark Gasson, Alessandro Vespignani, Roarke Horstmeyer, Phil Reed, Christof Koch.
43	5	"Does the Ocean Think?"	June 18, 2014
Last universal common ancestor (LUCA) lived about 3.5 billion years ago; it is the name for the first species on Earth in the primordial ocean. A hive of bees is a superorganism. Hydrogen sulfide is a gas that is extremely poisonous to mammals. Bacterial nanowires form when bacteria need to respire.: Interviewed experts: Anders Nilsson (scientist), Gustavo Caetano-Anolles, Tyler Volk, Lee Kump, Peter Ward (paleontologist), Yuri Gorby, David Marcogliese.
44	6	"Is a Zombie Apocalypse Possible?"	June 25, 2014
Ophiocordyceps unilateralis is known colloquially as the "zombie ant fungi." Kartik Chandran has discovered that Ebola relies on a membrane transport protein called NPC1 to infect cells. Human and bat cells both contain NPC1 transporter proteins in their cells. People infected with rabies become violent and belligerent. In 2014 when the COVID-19 virus was unheard of, Stacey Smith? does a classroom demonstration for Morgan Freeman in the year 2014 to demonstrate the infection rate of an air-borne virus like the flu. Morgan Freeman says, "Enzymes are the power tools of microbiology." Jamey Marth and his lab staff work with an enzyme known as Cre recombinase. Viral vectors can deliver rescue enzymes into human DNA.: Interviewed experts: David P. Hughes (entomologist), Kartik Chandran, Stacey Smith? at the University of Ottawa, W. Ian Lipkin, Jamey Marth, Alper Bozkurt at North Carolina State University, Scott Grafton.
45	7	"Is Gravity An Illusion?"	July 2, 2014
LIGO is funded by the American National Science Foundation; LIGO's mission is to measure gravitational waves. W and Z bosons are carriers of the weak nuclear interaction. On the other hand, the gluon is the carrier of strong nuclear interaction to bind particles together to form an atomic nucleus. Nonetheless, a so-called graviton that would be the carrier of gravity hasn't been observed! As of 2014, Zvi Bern concluded that a graviton is simply two gluons bound together; he, further, extrapolated that gravity is another manifestation of the strong nuclear force. In twistor space, "points are lines, and lines are points." Sean Carroll explain that quantum entanglement means that if one electron is spinning clockwise, then the other entangled electron is also spinning clockwise. The Almheiri-Marolf-Polchinski-Sully paradox states that there is a wall of fire at the event horizon (border) of a black hole. A supermassive black hole exists at the center of the Milky Way galaxy.: Interviewed experts: Nergis Mavalvala, Michael Landry, Zvi Bern, Dragan Hajduković, Herman Verlinde, Erik Verlinde, Sean Carroll (series regular cast), Sheperd S. Doeleman.
46	8	"Will We Become God?"	July 9, 2014
Morgan Freeman discusses if humans can become omnipotent as "God" is defined in Christianity, for example. If we stipulate a god as being omniscient, then some people such as Tom Rokicki stated that the best way to solve a Rubik's Cube puzzle is "God's algorithm." Rokicki found that the minimum number of turns to solve a Rubik's Cube is 20.: Interviewed experts: Adam Arkin (biologist), Melanie Bolling, Tom Rokicki, W. Richard Janikowski at the University of Memphis (who died in March 2021), Miguel Nicolelis, Anton Zeilinger, Marcelo Gleiser.
47	9	"Is There a Shadow Universe?"	July 16, 2014
Xenon 100 is an underground detector of dark matter in Italy. "Matter" particles may have "force" particle counterparts. By this logic, the "force" particle photon has a "matter version" counterpart called a photino. Morgan Freeman explains, "Every neutrino seen so far has been left-handed!" Gravitational lensing (bending of light) around the Bullet Cluster are the best evidence as of 2014 for the existence of dark matter; the Musket Ball Cluster is older. Mirror matter particles are complementary to ordinary matter. Robert Foot thinks mirror matter is dark matter. The anomaly in the shape of the cosmic microwave background has been called the "axis of evil".: Interviewed experts: Rafael F. Lang at Purdue University, Jon Butterworth, André de Gouvêa, William Dawson, Robert Foot at the University of Melbourne, Katherine Freese, Dragan Huterer.
48	10	"When Did Time Begin?"	July 23, 2014
Lawrence Schulman explains, "If the Sun were to explode, you would not know about it until 8 minutes after the event" because it takes 8 minutes for light to travel from the Sun to the Earth. After the Big Bang, there were only charged particles in the universe until the charged positive and negative particles came together during recombination (cosmology). Thermal time hypothesis is a proposal that time isn't a fundamental reality!: Interviewed experts: Janna Levin, Alexander Gaeta, Lawrence Schulman, Sean Carroll (series regular), Carlo Rovelli, Fay Dowker, Hartmut Häffner at UC Berkeley, Tongcang Li .

=== Season 6 (2015) ===
No. overall	No. in season	Title	Original release date
49	1	"Are We All Bigots?"	April 29, 2015
Morgan Freeman discusses the shooting of Amadou Diallo in 1999 in New York City. Peggy Mason studies the behavior of Sprague Dawley rats (albino) and black-caped rat (black and white). Mina Cikara remarks that the ventral striatum is activated for individuals experiencing schadenfreude.: Interviewed experts: Joshua Correll, Jon Freeman (academic), Peggy Mason, Mina Cikara, Darren Schreiber, Matthew Grizzard, Nicholas Christakis, James H. Fowler.
50	2	"Can Time Go Backwards?"	May 6, 2015
Light takes 4 years to travel from the nearby star Alpha Centauri to the Earth; consequently, what we see today on Earth happened 4 years ago on the stars of Alpha Centauri. A closed timelike curve (CTC) is a conjectured path to the past. The Higgs singlet is a hypothetical byproduct of the Higgs boson; the Higgs singlet only feels the single force of gravity.: Interviewed experts: Craig Callender, James Hartle, Sandu Popescu, Paul Davies, Todd Brun, Tom Weiler, Luke M. Butcher.
51	3	"Are We Here for a Reason?"	May 13, 2015
Neural crest genes affect brain development. A wolf (Canis lupus) has been domesticated into a dog (Canis lupus familiaris). Aurochs mutated into the domestic cattle called cows. Sue Blackmore calls a techonological meme a "teme.": Interviewed experts: Leroy Cronin, Richard Lenski, Razib Khan, Susan Blackmore, Sara Imari Walker, James Sethna at Cornell University, Anthony Burrow.
52	4	"Do We Live in the Matrix?"	May 20, 2015
Morgan Freeman explains that we don't see screen tearing in our world. Commentators discuss the simulation hypothesis. Jim Gates has tried to represent equations in geometrical shapes which he calls adinkras.: Interviewed experts: Jesse Schell, Nick Bostrom, Stephen D Larson, Silas R. Beane, Jürgen Schmidhuber, Sylvester James Gates, Clément Vidal.
53	5	"Are Aliens Inside Us?"	May 27, 2015
Morgan Freeman explains, "Transposons are pieces of DNA that sneak in from the outside and insert themselves into our genes." Neither Martian rocks nor our other neighboring planets seem to contain living organisms. Milton Wainwright says, "The basic idea of panspermia is that life came from space." IceCube is a detector of neutrinos at the South Pole. Upon detection of a neutrino, there is a Glashow resonance event. Avida is like a computer virus albeit Avida introduces mutations with some copies of itself.: Interviewed experts: Cédric Feschotte at Cornell University, Fred Adams, Milton Wainwright, John Learned, Andrew Siemion, Chris Adami, Alejandro Jenkins.
54	6	"Why Do We Lie?"	June 3, 2015
White matter cells create connections between neurons (grey matter). Yaling Yang's research has found that pathelogical liars have less grey matter in their brains compared to normal people. Miraculin is a protein that makes us perceive sour foods as sweet!: Interviewed experts: Kang Lee, Yaling Yang, Jeffrey T. Hancock, John Kircher, Donald D. Hoffman, Susumu Tonegawa, Jeff Tollaksen.

=== Season 7 (2016) ===
No. overall	No. in season	Title	Original release date	US viewers (millions)
55	1	"What Makes a Terrorist?"	August 30, 2016	0.466
Terrorists and ironworkers both work in risky professions; however, terrorists are willing to work without pay! Abdelhamid Abaaoud had "deep friendships" with the people such as Salah Abdeslam in his group. Canadian citizen Momin Khawaja became an Islamic radical in isolation; he was apprehended in Britain before he could participate in a terrorist activity with a cell. Morgan Freeman and Arie Kruglanski discuss the trolley problem.: Interviewed experts: Scott Atran, Jay van Bavel, Nafees Hamid, Sophia Moskalenko, Arie W. Kruglanski, Eran Halperin, Peter Turchin.
56	2	"Is Privacy Dead?"	September 6, 2016	0.364
The ventral tegmental area and nucleus accumbens are in the "reward pathway" of a human brain. Morgan Freeman says, "A surge of dopamine can trigger pleasant feelings." A DNA bank can store the genetic codes of hundreds of thousands of people; 23andMe and Ancestry.com will sequence a person's DNA. The ideas of Steve Mann have inspired Google Glass.: Interviewed experts: Nick Bostrom, Antti Oulasvirta, Alessandro Acquisti, Diana Tamir, Yaniv Erlich, Steve Mann (inventor), David Brin.
57	3	"Are There More Than Two Sexes?"	September 13, 2016	0.357
Indian sprinter Dutee Chand competes in women's competition; in 2014, Chand was found to have high levels of testosterone in her blood. The SRY gene is found on the Y chromosome; the SRY gene is 887 base pairs. Guevedoce children have been studied in the Dominican Republic. DHT is more potent than testosterone in giving male characteristics to a person. DMRT1 is a gene that helps the testes develop. On the other hand, FOXL2 feminizes the body. Pogonomyrmex are "bearded ants.": Interviewed experts: Richard Holt at the University of Southampton, Daphna Joel, Eric Vilain, Christopher Houk in South Carolina, Ivanka Savic, David Zarkower, Joel Parker, Sara Helms Cahan.
58	4	"Can We All Become Geniuses?"	September 20, 2016	0.332
Morgan Freeman says, "The Kodály method teaches children to think of music as a three-dimensional space." Philo Farnsworth invented television. Richard T. James invented the Slinky. Stochastic resonance can boost weak signals. Freeman says that the dorsolateral prefrontal cortex (DL-PFC) "plays a key role in problem solving." Freeman says that PDE4B has a detrimental effect on memory formation.: Interviewed experts: Jason Padgett (see Berit Brogaard#Cognitive neuroscience), Martin F. Gardiner, John Kounios, Roi Cohen Kadosh, John Georgiou in Toronto, Thomas Hills at the University of Warwick, Theodore W. Berger at the University of Southern California.

=== Season 8 (2017) ===
No. overall	No. in season	Title	Original release date	US viewers (millions)
59	1	"Is the Force With Us?"	April 25, 2017	0.369
The Force in Star Wars gives people the power of telekinesis. Near the end of the episode, Freeman says, " In Star Wars, you can use the Force to hear the voices of people who aren't here anymore." LIGO is in the American states of Louisiana and Washington; LIGO rules out earthquakes and other local forces in its search for gravitational waves from outer space. Quantum entanglement appears to be non-local! Anton Zeilinger does an experiment for this episode at the Hofburg Palace in Vienna, Austria. With his De Broglie–Bohm theory in 1952, David Bohm proposed that quantum particles follow predictable paths. According to Damien Easson, the essence of loop quantum gravity (LQG) is that "empty space itself is made out of quantum bricks of nothing.": Interviewed experts: Jamie Rollins at LIGO, Claudia de Rham, Anton Zeilinger, Aephraim M. Steinberg, Daniel Kabat, Damien Easson, S. Jay Olson at Boise State University.
60	2	"Can We Cheat Death?"	May 2, 2017	0.347
Biologists have noticed a positive correlation between the protein sirtuin and cellular longevity. Moreover, as we age, the levels of NAD go down steadily. Turritopsis dohrnii is also known as the "immortal jellyfish." The process of cellular trans-differentiation means that one type of cell in the body can transform itself into another type of missing cell in the body. Adult stem cells induced to become embryonic stem cells are known as induced pluripotent stem cells (iPS cells). CRISPR can be used to repair DNA. Cas9 is an example of CRISPR that functions like a police officer to protect the cell's DNA. Some bowhead whales live past 200 years! Terror management theory is used by people facing death.: Interviewed experts: David A. Sinclair, Shin Kubota, Lawrence S.B. Goldstein, André Martins (biologist), Jennifer Doudna, George Church, Stephen Cave.
61	3	"Can We Hack the Planet?"	May 9, 2017	0.282
Mosquito-borne diseases kill more than 1,000,000 people in the world every year! Oxitec biologists have produced mosquitoes with a reduced lifespan. The fog-basking beetles in Namibia condense water on their shells to cool themselves. The Sahara Forest Project has been started in the hot country of Qatar. Freeman calls solar geoengineering "a kind of sunscreen for the planet." The 1991 eruption of Mount Pinatubo spewed 20,000,000 tons of sulfur dioxide into the Earth's stratosphere. A rectenna can receive the concentrated energy of sunlight sent to the Earth. Freeman discusses space-based solar power.: Interviewed experts: Guilherme Trivellato researching in Piracicaba, Stephen Salter, Michael Pollan, Beth Shapiro, Geoffrey Holmes at Carbon Engineering, David Keith, Paul Jaffe.
62	4	"Is Gun Crime a Virus?"	May 16, 2017	0.206
Jonylah Watkins was a 6-month-old baby whose death seemed random; however, Morgan Freeman explain that Jonylah's father was the target of the attack. Andrew Papachristos says that the attributes of being young and male are "risk factors" of becoming a victim of gun violence. He uses social network analysis to study gun violence. The anterior cingulate cortex regulates decision-making. Freeman talks about smart guns.: Interviewed experts: Sherry Towers, Gary Slutkin, Miles Wernick at the Illinois Institute of Technology, Jonathan Lewin was at the Chicago Police Department when this episode aired, Andrew Papachristos, Charles Branas, Brad Bushman, Kent Kiehl, Kai Kloepfer.

== Release ==
On February 17, 2011, Sean Carroll confirmed on his Twitter page that filming of season 2 of Through the Wormhole began. On May 17, 2011, Discovery confirmed the second season would premiere on Science on June 8, 2011. An episode from the second season was supposed to air on July 13, 2011, but went unaired. It was later released on the season 2 DVD on November 22, 2011, as the sixth episode. On January 3, 2012, Sean Carroll posted a picture on his Twitter page, mentioning that it was taken during the taping of season 3. Season 3 began with a special episode on March 6, 2012, and the remaining nine episodes began airing on June 6, 2012.

Season 4 of Through the Wormhole began with a special episode on March 20, 2013, and the remaining nine episodes began airing on June 5, 2013. On October 9, 2013, the Science Channel began airing enhanced episodes of the show under the title Beyond the Wormhole with Morgan Freeman. Season 5 of Through the Wormhole began with a special episode on March 5, 2014, and the remaining nine episodes began airing on June 4, 2014. On March 10, 2014, series producer Anthony Lund stated in an interview with the Los Angeles Post-Examiner that "Wormhole season 6 is a GO, and I'm dreaming of new, thought provoking ideas to explore with this show."

Season 6 of Through the Wormhole premiered on April 29, 2015. Season 6 consists of six episodes, unlike the previous seasons, which all have ten (except season 1, which has 8 episodes). On March 31, 2016, Science Channel announced it would return for a seventh season, which premiered on August 30, 2016. The eighth and final season premiered on April 25, 2017.

== Home media ==
In region 1, season 1 was released on DVD on March 8, 2011, season 2 was released on November 22, 2011, season 3 was released on October 23, 2012, season 4 was released on September 16, 2014, season 5 was released on June 16, 2015, and season 6 was released on December 15, 2016.

== See also ==
- The Universe
- How the Universe Works
- Killers of the Cosmos
- Into the Universe with Stephen Hawking
- The Fabric of the Cosmos
- The Planets
- The Planets and Beyond
- Strip the Cosmos
- Curiosity
- Cosmos
