= Steven Weinstein =

Steven Weinstein may refer to:

- Steven Weinstein (philosopher), Canadian philosopher
- Steve Weinstein (b. 1964), American professional bridge and poker player
