= Kamitani =

Kamitani (上谷) is a Japanese surname. Variants include 神谷, 狼谷, 帋谷, 紙谷, 角谷, 加美谷 and 加見谷.

== Notable people with the surname ==
- George Kamitani (神谷 盛治, Kamitani Jōji), founder of Japanese video game developer company Vanillaware
- Hideyoshi Kamitani (神谷 英慶; born 1992), Japanese professional wrestler
- Saya Kamitani (上谷 沙弥; born 1996), Japanese professional wrestler
- Takahiro Kamitani (上谷 隆宏), cofounder of Pixiv
- Yukiyasu Kamitani (神谷 之康), Japanese academic
