= Virgocentric flow =

Movement of the Local Group towards the Virgo Cluster

The Virgocentric flow (VCF) is the preferred movement of Local Group galaxies towards the Virgo Cluster caused by its overwhelming gravity, which separates bound objects from the Hubble flow of cosmic expansion. The VCF can refer to the Local Group's movement towards the Virgo Cluster, since its center is considered synonymous with the Virgo cluster, but more tedious to ascertain due to its much larger volume. The excess velocity of Local Group galaxies towards, and with respect to, the Virgo Cluster are 100 to 400 km/s. This excess velocity is referred to as each galaxy's peculiar velocity.

== See also ==
- Great Attractor
- Shapley Attractor
- Dark flow
