= Frontiers in Bioscience =

- Discipline: Life sciences
- Language: English
- Edited by: Graham Pawelec, Gustavo Caetano-Anollés, Baohong Zhang

Publication details
- History: 1996–present
- Publisher: IMR Press (Singapore)
- Frequency: Monthly
- Open access: Yes
- Impact factor: 3.3 (2023)

Standard abbreviations
- ISO 4: Front. Biosci.

Indexing
- Landmark Edition
- ISSN: 1093-9946 (print); 1093-4715 (web)
- Scholar Edition
- ISSN: 1945-0516 (print); 1945-0524 (web)
- Elite Edition
- ISSN: 1945-0494 (print); 1945-0508 (web)

Links
- Journal homepage; Online archives

Frontiers in Bioscience is a peer-reviewed scientific journal. It was established in 1996 and covers all biological and medical sciences. The journal consists of three sections: Landmark Edition, Scholar Edition, and Elite Edition. The editor-in-chief of the Landmark Edition is Graham Pawelec. The editor-in-chief of the Scholar Edition is Gustavo Caetano-Anollés. The editor-in-chief of the Elite Edition is Baohong Zhang.

== Abstracting and indexing ==
The Landmark Edition of the journal is abstracted and indexed in:

- Biological Abstracts
- BIOSIS Previews
- Current Contents/Life Sciences
- Index Medicus/MEDLINE/PubMed (also the other two editions)
- Science Citation Index Expanded
- Scopus (all three editions)
- The Zoological Record

== Reception ==
According to the Journal Citation Reports, the journal has a 2023 impact factor of 3.3.
