= MANET database =

Bioinformatics database

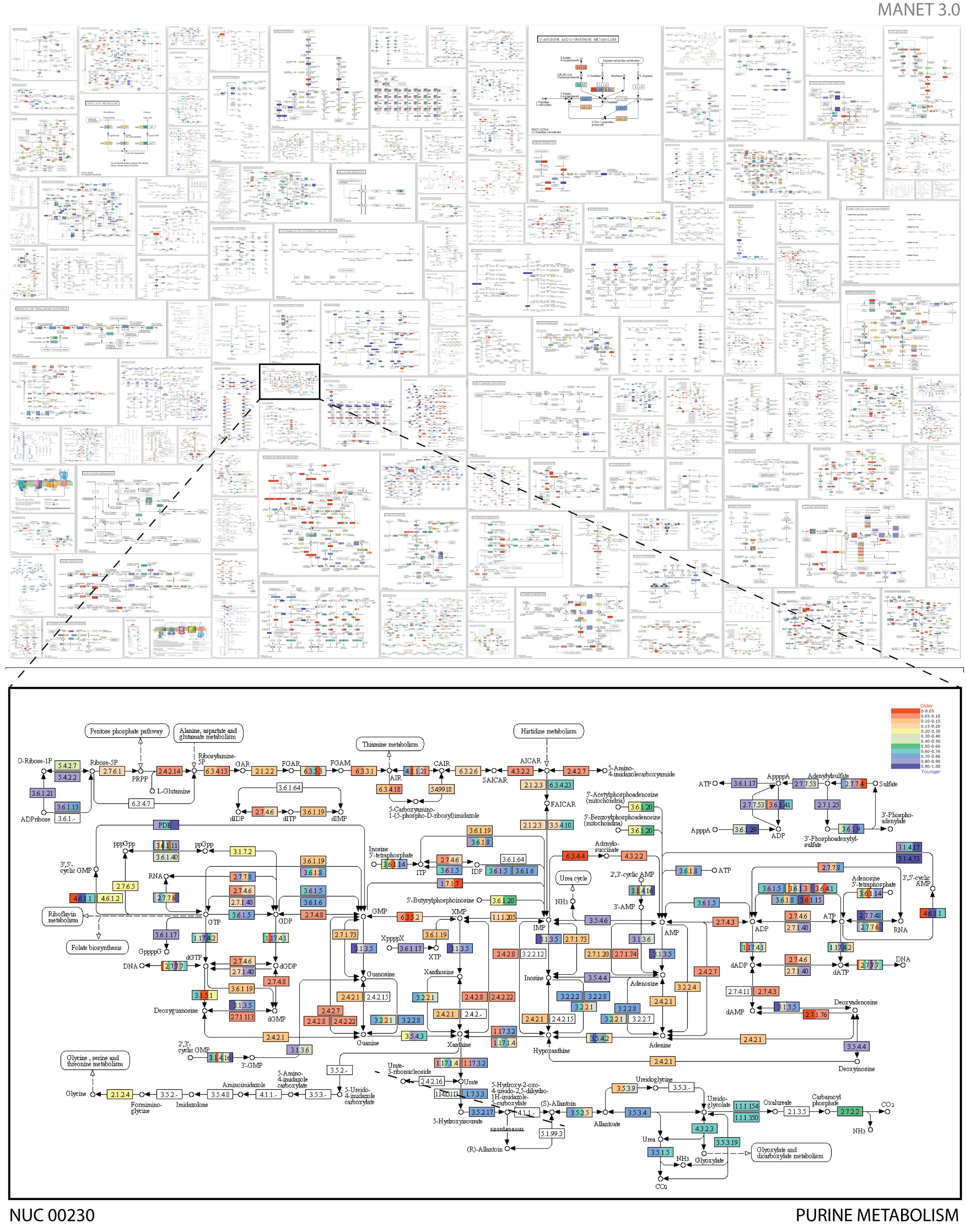
A collage of the 148 subnetwork diagrams of MANET 3.0 (in the top) and the oldest subnetwork, NUC00230 purine metabolism (in the bottom), highlight how metabolic pathways are enzymatic patchworks of different evolutionary ages.

The Molecular Ancestry Network (MANET) database is a bioinformatics database that maps evolutionary relationships of protein architectures directly onto biological networks. It was originally developed by Hee Shin Kim, Jay E. Mittenthal and Gustavo Caetano-Anollés in the Department of Crop Sciences of the University of Illinois at Urbana-Champaign.

MANET traces for example the ancestry of individual metabolic enzymes in metabolism with bioinformatic, phylogenetic, and statistical methods. MANET currently links information in the Structural Classification of Proteins (SCOP) database, the metabolic pathways database of the Kyoto Encyclopedia of Genes and Genomes (KEGG), and phylogenetic reconstructions describing the evolution of protein fold architecture at a universal level. The database has been updated to reflect the evolution of metabolism at the level of protein fold families. MANET literally "paints" the ancestries of enzymes derived from rooted phylogenetic trees directly onto over one hundred metabolic pathways representations, paying homage to one of the fathers of impressionism. It also provides numerous functionalities that enable searching specific protein folds with defined ancestry values, displaying the distribution of enzymes that are painted, and exploring quantitative details describing individual protein folds. This permits the study of global and local metabolic network architectures, and the extraction of evolutionary patterns at global and local levels.

The database is useful for the study of metabolic evolution. A statistical analysis of the data in MANET showed for example a patchy distribution of ancestry values assigned to protein folds in each subnetwork, indicating that evolution of metabolism occurred globally by widespread recruitment of enzymes. MANET was used to sort out enzymatic recruitment processes in metabolic networks and propose that modern metabolism originated in the purine nucleotide metabolic subnetwork. Analysis of the purine metabolism revealed gradual evolutionary replacement of abiotic chemistries by protein enzymes. The database helped uncover a physical and evolutionary conservation trace in the structure of active sites during the emergence of metabolic activities.
