= Alexander Kashlinsky =

Latvian astronomer and cosmologist

Alexander (Sasha) Kashlinsky (born 1957 in Riga) is an astronomer and cosmologist working at NASA Goddard-Space-Flight-Center, known for work on dark flow and the cosmic infrared background.

Kashlinsky has been interviewed by Morgan Freeman in season 2 of Through the Wormhole.

== Biography ==
- 1976-1979: Tel Aviv University, Israel, Department of Physics & Astronomy
- 1979-1983: University of Cambridge, England, Institute of Astronomy
