= Philip Low (neuroscientist) =

Computational neuroscientist and entrepreneur

Philip Steven Low
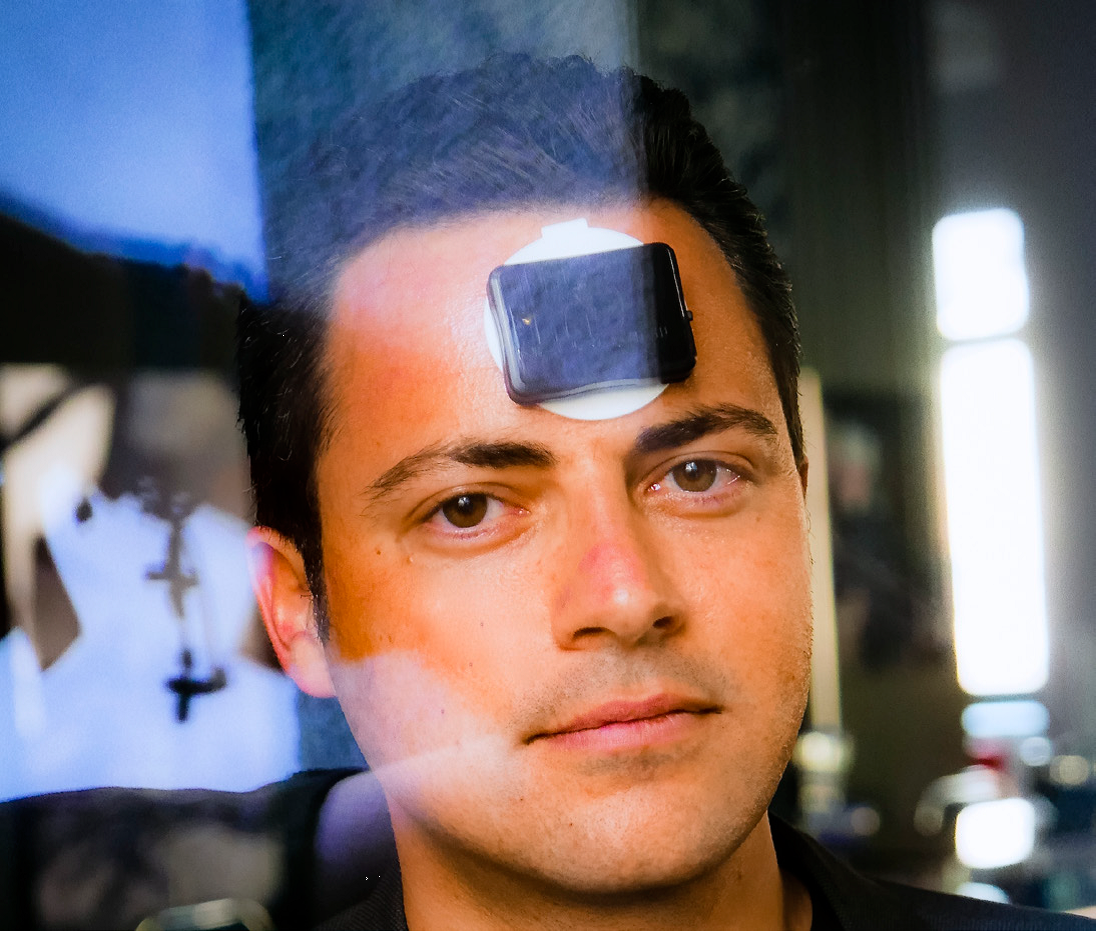
- Born: August 17, 1979 (age 47); Vienna, Austria
- Citizenship: Canada
- Education: Ph.D., University of California, San Diego; B.Sc., University of Chicago
- Occupation: Scientist
- Known for: Animal consciousness iBrain inventor
- Scientific career
- Fields: Computational neuroscience; Brain–computer interface; Artificial intelligence
- Workplaces: Neurovigil, Inc; Philip Low Foundation
- Thesis: A New Way To Look At Sleep: Separation & Convergence (2007)
- Doctoral advisors: Terry Sejnowski; Fred Gage
- Website: neurovigil.com

Philip Low (born 1979) is a Canadian inventor, computational neuroscientist, and mathematician. He is the chairman, CEO and founder of NeuroVigil, a neurotechnology company. He is the author of the Cambridge Declaration on Consciousness; his research is focused on the development of technical means to decipher human brain waves. MIT Technology Review recognized him as one of its 2010 "35 Under 35" outstanding innovators.

== Early life and education ==
Philip Low was born in Vienna, Austria. After completing his primary schooling at Cours Hattemer in Paris in 1991, Low attended Institut Le Rosey where he graduated in 1996 with a specialization in mathematics.

=== Family ===
Low's father, Steven Low (born Seweryn Lwów) was a Jewish Holocaust survivor from Poland, who came to Canada in 1948. In Canada, the elder Low attended McGill University on a chess scholarship and worked for Canadian mining tycoon Joseph Hirshhorn, later "investing in copper mining in South America ... [and] brokering oil deals in the Middle East" according to an obituary following his death on May 19, 2024. According to his daughter, Veronica, she and Low established the Steven Low Foundation in 2022 to support the identification and reburial of the remains of First Nations children from Indian residential schools.

Low has described his father as "highly accomplished" but "violent". According to Low, he became interested in the fragility of the human brain as a child when his father overdosed on a sleep drug and threatened a Swiss banker with a weapon.

=== Tertiary education ===
Low received his B.Sc. in pure mathematics from the University of Chicago; during his studies there, he undertook a summer research internship at Harvard Medical School.

In 2007, Low went on to earn a Ph.D. in computational neurobiology from the University of California, San Diego (UCSD), for work done at the Salk Institute for Biological Studies. At Salk, Low developed Dynamic Spectral Scoring (DSS), and the SPEARS (Sleep Parametric EEG Automated Recognition System) algorithm, which is used to map brain waves. Low presented the algorithm as his doctoral dissertation, the body of which he says was one page long and the shortest in the history of the university. (Note: A member of Low's review committee recalled a longer submission. The entire document, including appendices, is 346 pages long as published at UCSD, and contains a single-page 'Chapter 1' as the only non-preface, non-appendix, material.)

== Career ==
In 2007, Low founded NeuroVigil, a neurotechnology company that manufactures a brain monitoring device called iBrain, inspired by his doctoral research. Traditional EEG devices use multiple electrodes, which require lengthy setup and can be cumbersome for users. In contrast, the iBrain is a compact, single-electrode device that is easy to place, wear, and remove. While single-electrode headsets were historically seen as offering poor data quality due to fewer sensors, Neurovigil's Independent Component Analysis (ICA) has proven that single-electrode recordings can provide rich data. Nobel Laureate Roger Guillemin stated that "Philip discovered a fundamentally new way to assess brain activity".

The iBrain has been applied to pharmaceutical drug trials by Roche and Novartis. It can record baseline sleep EEG data before subjects take medication, allowing researchers to monitor longitudinally how the medication affects brain activity. Low stated that, during the Great Recession, he made a strategic decision to avoid the consumer market, and instead form alliances with pharmaceutical companies, to generate cashflow and intellectual property. In 2013, Low and NeuroVigil conducted further iBrain trials with another ALS sufferer, Augie Nieto, the founder of Life Fitness, Augie's Quest to Cure ALS and the ALS Therapy Development Institute. The trials were featured in Episode 6 (Can our minds be hacked?) of Season 4 of the popular science TV series, Through the Wormhole. The device was formally launched in the United States in 2024 and was featured in Time Magazine's "Best inventions of 2025".

=== Awards and honors ===
Low was named to the 2010 edition of MIT Technology Review's "35 Under 35" list of young innovators. In 2011, he was awarded the inaugural Jacobs-Rady Pioneer Award for Global Innovation and Entrepreneurship.

=== Cambridge Declaration on Consciousness ===
In 2012, Low, with Christof Koch and David Edelman, published the Cambridge Declaration on Consciousness, which asserts that "humans are not unique in possessing the neurological substrates that generate consciousness" and that non-human life may also possess consciousness. He also collaborated with Stephen Hawking, who provided him with data for his non-invasive iBrain monitor to interpret brain waves to decipher human intentions and enable communication.

== Musk criticism ==
Low met Elon Musk for the first time in 2011 at a social event in Paris, after which they regularly interacted socially in Los Angeles. In 2015 Musk joined NeuroVigil's board, after participating in their 2015 capital raise. In January 2025, following the Elon Musk salute controversy, Low started criticizing Musk publicly, calling him a "total miserable self-loathing poser." He stated that Elon Musk's "pattern is to take companies, invest in them, destabilise them, and then take them over" and that "...the White House is his biggest investment to date." Low stated that his view of Musk's pattern was based on his experience of Musk's investment in his company, and on his observations of how Musk acted with Twitter.

== Personal life ==
Low is a Canadian citizen and he lives in La Jolla, California. He enjoys running, skiing, and chess.

== Works ==
=== Articles ===
- Low, Philip (April 5, 2016). "No Neurozone for Trump". Huffington Post.

=== Doctoral dissertation ===
- Low, Philip (2007). A new way to look at sleep : separation & convergence (Ph.D. thesis). University of California, San Diego.

=== Selected patents ===
- US patent 11696724, Philip Low, "Methods of identifying sleep and waking patterns and uses", issued July 11, 2023 (also published as Israel patent 212852A and New Zealand patent 622327A)
- US patent 11672459, Philip Low, "Localized collection of biological signals, cursor control in speech-assistance interface based on biological electrical signals and arousal detection based on biological electrical signals", issued September 8, 2016
- US patent 2014031711A1, Philip Low, "Correlating brain signal to intentional and unintentional changes in brain state", issued June 14, 2016
- Australia patent 2010315468B2, Philip Low, Yu Chi, Siddarth Joshi, Christopher Uebelher, Yvon A. Dubois, Kevin Liu, "Head harness and wireless EEG monitoring system", issued March 10, 2016 (US patent 2021212564A1 pending)
- US patent 8073534, Philip Low, "Automated detection of sleep and waking states", issued January 18, 2007 (also published as China patent 101272732B, Canada patent 2607049, Europe patent 1885237, South Korea patent 101395197B1, Spain patent ES2542852T3, Hong Kong patent HK1113072, Israel patent 187239 and Japan patent 5964351B2
