= Dara Ó Briain's Science Club =

British science television series

- Also known as: Science Club
- Genre: Science
- Presented by: Dara Ó Briain
- Starring: Mark Miodownik; Tali Sharot; Helen Czerski; Alok Jha
- Country of origin: United Kingdom
- Original language: English
- No. of series: 2
- No. of episodes: 12

Production
- Running time: 60 minutes

Original release
- Network: BBC Two
- Release: 6 November 2012 – 29 August 2013

Dara Ó Briain's Science Club is a British science television series presented by Dara Ó Briain which first aired on BBC Two between 6 November 2012 and 29 August 2013. Each week, the team take one subject and explore all possible angles, combining it with studio discussions in front of a live audience, films and on the spot reports. Science Club won The Best TV General Programme Award at the 2013 European Science TV and New Media Awards beating off competition from QI, Science Squad and Biomimetics.

== Episodes ==
=== Series 1 (2012) ===
No. overall	No. in series	Topic	Original release date
1	1	Reproduction	6 November 2012
2	2	Albert Einstein	13 November 2012
3	3	Life, death and extinction	20 November 2012
4	4	Space	27 November 2012
5	5	Brain	4 December 2012
6	6	Music	30 December 2012

=== Series 2 (2013) ===
No. overall	No. in series	Topic	Original release date
7	1	Mindbending	25 July 2013
8	2	Adventures in Time	1 August 2013
9	3	DIY Science	8 August 2013
10	4	Future Fantastic	15 August 2013
11	5	Size Matters	22 August 2013
12	6	Invisible Worlds	29 August 2013
