= Gustavo Caetano-Anollés =

American bioinformatician and computational biologist

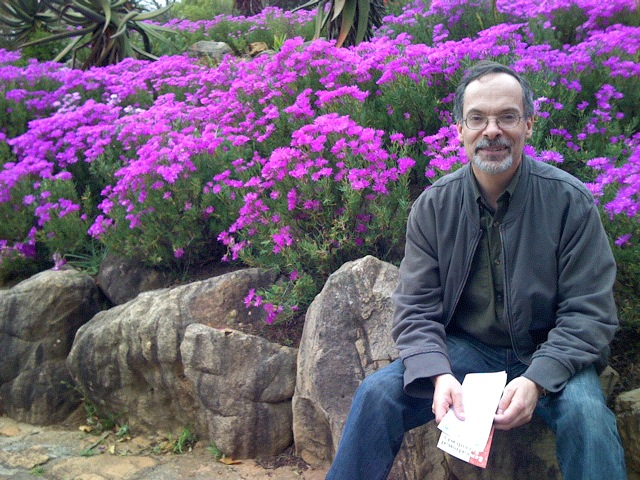
- Education: National University of La Plata
- Known for: Root nodule research, genetic marker, silver stain, molecular evolution, phylogenomics
- Awards: Zuckerkandl Prize
- Scientific career
- Fields: Computational Biology Astrobiology Genomics
- Workplaces: University of Illinois at Urbana-Champaign
- Website: http://gca.cropsci.illinois.edu/gca.html

Gustavo Caetano-Anollés (born 1955 in Montevideo, Uruguay) is an American bioinformatician and computational biologist whose work focuses on evolutionary genomics. He is Professor of Bioinformatics in the Department of Crop Sciences, University of Illinois at Urbana-Champaign, an affiliate of the Carl R. Woese Institute for Genomic Biology, and holds a Health Innovation Professor appointment in the Department of Biomedical and Translational Sciences at the Carle Illinois College of Medicine. Caetano-Anollés has made contributions to molecular evolution, phylogenomics, and the evolutionary study of macromolecular structure. He is a recognized expert in the field of evolutionary biology and comparative genomics.

== Early life and education ==
After his family moved to Punta del Este, Caetano-Anollés attended the Lyceum of Maldonado, where he became interested in molecular biology. He later studied chemistry and biochemistry at the National University of La Plata in Argentina, earning a degree in Chemistry in 1978, an MS in Biochemistry in 1980, and his PhD in Biochemical Sciences in 1986. His doctoral dissertation, "The symbiotic association of Rhizobium and legumes", was supervised by Gabriel Favelukes, an Argentinian pioneer in plant molecular biology and rhizobiology, and was the first dissertation to be defended publicly at the university. The examination committee was chaired by Nobel laureate Luis Federico Leloir.

== Career ==
In 1986, Caetano-Anollés moved to the United States for postdoctoral research at Ohio State University and was later appointed Research Assistant Professor at the University of Tennessee. Early in his career, he investigated the symbiosis between nitrogen-fixing root nodule-forming bacteria and legumes from different angles, exploring the role of bacterial attachment and chemotaxis and plant systemic signals in nodule development. During this period, he co-invented the technique of DNA amplification with arbitrary primers [see DNA amplification fingerprinting (DAF) and arbitrarily amplified DNA (AAD)]. This technique generates fingerprints of nucleic acids and molecular markers useful for genome mapping and molecular ecology and evolution. He also developed widely adopted methods for the silver staining of DNA that are commercially available.

In 1998, Caetano-Anollés joined the faculty of the Department of Biology at the University of Oslo, directed the Laboratory of Molecular Ecology and Evolution, and conducted research on the evolution of molecular structure with an emphasis on ribosomal evolution. He joined the University of Illinois in 2003, where he established his Evolutionary Bioinformatics laboratory and expanded multiple lines of research in evolutionary and structural bioinformatics. His current research integrates structural biology, genomics and molecular evolution, focusing on evolution of macromolecular structure. During his career, he served as consultant for international, private and public institutions, including the IAEA, the Millennium Science Initiative, and Lockheed Martin Energy Systems at Oak Ridge, and was Chief Scientific Officer of Vital NRG, a bioinformatics venture based in Knoxville. He is Editor-in-Chief of the journals Evolutionary Bioinformatics and Frontiers in Bioscience (scholar edition).

== Research contributions ==
Since joining the University of Illinois, his research group has reconstructed the history of the protein world using information in entire genomes, revealed the existence of a 'big bang' of protein domain combinations late in evolution, traced evolution of proteins in biological networks (e.g., the MANET database), uncovered the origin of modern biological networks in pathways of nucleotide metabolism, revealed important evolutionary reductive tendencies in the structural makeup of proteins (including a Menzerath's law), studied how structural domains arise by combination of protein loops, and traced the evolution of intrinsic disorder in proteins. His focus on molecular origins has impacted understanding of important questions for origins of life research.

=== A new virus theory ===
His group used genomic information to propose that viruses are derived from ancient cells and were the first lineage to arise from the last universal ancestor of life (LUCA). Large-scale phylogenomic analyses of protein folds show that the deep evolutionary ancestry of viruses places them alongside Archaea, Bacteria and Eukarya as a fourth supergroup in the tree of life. The group also found Archaea was the first cellular lineage to arise in evolution from a universal ancestor that was complex at the molecular and cellular level.

=== Origin and evolution of the ribosome ===
His team is currently exploring the role of structure and organization in the coevolution of proteins and functional RNA (e.g., ribosomal and transfer RNA), including the origin and history of translation and the genetic code. Phylogenomic analysis of RNA and protein molecules that make up the ribosome show that the most ancient ribosomal RNA structures interacted with the most ancient ribosomal proteins, triggering a coordinated accretion process that ultimately resulted in a functional ribosomal core, halfway through the evolution of life and prior to cellular diversification. These coevolutionary patterns challenge the ancient 'RNA world' hypothesis and place the rise of genetics late in evolution.

=== The proteomic origins of the genetic code ===
His research points to a genetic code that is best described as a dynamic, coevolving system shaped by interactions among amino acids, RNA, and early catalysts rather than a static product of stereochemistry or chance. Phylogenetic analyses of tRNAs, protein domains, and dipeptides revealed the stepwise incorporation of amino acids and codons, a transition from an operational to a canonical code, and the emergence of dual-function ancestral synthetases and bidirectional coding. These results have significant biological and philosophical implications.

== Scholarly influence and impact beyond academia ==
Caetano-Anollés is author or co-author of well over 200 peer-reviewed publications, contributed chapters to many scientific books, and edited volumes such as DNA Markers: Protocols, Application and Overviews and Evolutionary Genomics and Systems Biology. He outlines his views on molecular evolution in his book Untangling Molecular Biodiversity. His work on DNA silver staining and molecular markers has been widely cited, with several publications receiving thousands of citations. His research enhances understanding of life's origins and informs fields such as synthetic biology, genetic engineering, and systems biology. His phylogenomic approaches have been translated into broader evolutionary theory discussions, including the roles of molecular structure and networks in shaping biological complexity. His research has been featured in numerous venues, including Science & Vie, National Geographic, and Morgan Freeman's Through the Wormhole.

== Selected publications ==
- Caetano-Anollés G (2023) Agency in evolution of biomolecular communication. Annals of the New York Academy of Science 1525(1): 88-103. doi:10.1111/nyas.15005 PMID 37219369
- Tomaszewski T, Ali MA, Caetano-Anollés K, Caetano-Anollés G (2023) Seasonal effects decouple SARS-CoV-2 haplotypes worldwide. F100Research 12: 267. doi:10.12688/f1000research.131522.1 PMID 37069849
- Jeong H, Arif B, Caetano-Anollés G, Kim KM, Nasir A (2019) Horizontal gene transfer in human-associated microorganism inferred by phylogenetic reconstruction and reconciliation. Scientific Reports 9(1):5953. doi:10.1038/s41598-019-42227-5 PMID 30976019
- Nasir A, Caetano-Anollés G (2015) A phylogenomic data-driven exploration of viral origins and evolution. Science Advances 1(8): e1500527. doi:10.1126/sciadv.1500527 PMID 26601271
- Nasir A, Kim KM, Caetano-Anollés G (2012) Viral evolution. Primordial cellular origins and late adaptation to parasitism. Mobile Genetic Elements 2(5): 1-6. doi:10.4161/mge.22797 PMID 23550145
- Kim KM, Qin T, Jiang YY, Chen LL, Xiong M, Caetano-Anollés D, Zhang HY, Caetano-Anollés G (2012) Protein domain structure uncovers the origin of aerobic metabolism and the rise of planetary oxygen. Structure 20(1): 67-76. doi:10.1093/molbev/msq232 PMID 20805191
- Kim KM, Caetano-Anollés G (2010) Emergence and evolution of modern molecular functions inferred from phylogenomic analysis of ontological data. Molecular Biology and Evolution 27(7): 1710-1733. doi:10.1093/molbev/msq106 PMID 20418223
- Caetano-Anollés G, Wang M, Mittenthal JE (2009) The origin, evolution and structure of the protein world. Biochemical Journal 417(3): 621-637. doi:10.1042/BJ20082063 PMID 19133840
- Sun FJ, Caetano-Anollés G (2008) Evolutionary patterns in the sequence and structure of transfer RNA: early origins of Archaea and viruses. PLoS Computational Biology 4(3): e1000018. doi:10.1371/journal.pcbi.1000018 PMID 18369418
- Sun FJ, Caetano-Anollés G (2008) The origin and evolution of tRNA inferred from phylogenetic analysis of structure. Journal of Molecular Evolution 66(1): 21-35. doi:10.1007/s00239-007-9050-8 PMID 18058157
- Wang M, Yafremava LS, Caetano-Anollés D, Mittenthal JS, Caetano-Anollés G (2007) Reductive evolution of architectural repertoires in proteomes and the birth of the tripartite world. Genome Research 17(11): 1572-1585. doi:10.1101/gr.6454307 PMID 17908824
- Wang M, Caetano-Anollés G (2006) Global phylogeny determined by the combination of protein domains in proteomes. Molecular Biology and Evolution 23(12): 2444-54. doi:10.1093/molbev/msl117 PMID 16971695
- Mathesius U, Mulders S, Gao M, Teplitski M, Caetano-Anollés G, Rolfe BG, Bauer WD (2003) Extensive and specific responses of a eukaryote to bacterial-sensing signals. Proceedings of the National Academy of Sciences USA 100(3): 1444-1449. doi:10.1073/pnas.262672599 PMID 12511600
- Caetano-Anollés G, Caetano-Anollés D (2003) An evolutionarily structured universe of protein architecture. Genome Research 13(7): 1563-1571. doi:10.1101/gr.1161903 PMID 12840035
- Caetano-Anollés G (2002) Tracing the evolution of RNA structure in ribosomes. Nucleic Acids Research 30(11): 2575-2587. doi:10.1093/nar/30.11.2575 PMID 12034847
- Caetano-Anollés G (2002) Evolved RNA secondary structure and the rooting of the universal tree. Journal of Molecular Evolution 54(3): 333-345. doi:10.1007/s00239-001-0048-3 PMID 11847559
- Caetano-Anollés G (1996) Scanning of nucleic acids by in vitro amplification: new developments and applications. Nature Biotechnology 14(13): 1668-1674. doi:10.1038/nbt1296-1668 PMID 9634849
- Caetano-Anollés G, Gresshoff PM (1991) Plant genetic control of nodulation. Annual Review in Microbiology 45: 345-382. doi:10.1146/annurev.mi.45.100191.002021 PMID 1741618

== Awards and honors ==
Caetano-Anolléƒs received the Emile Zuckerkandl Prize in molecular evolution in 2002, was named University Scholar at the University of Illinois in 2010, and is Fulbright Scholar (2016). He has also been recognized with additional distinctions for his scientific contributions.

== Personal life ==
Caetano-Anollés and his wife Gloria have two children, both of whom have been coauthors and part of his research team. Gloria is a surgical nurse and worked in the thoracic surgery team of René Favaloro in Argentina and in the surgical department of the Baptist Hospital of East Tennessee.
