= Evolutionary Bioinformatics =

American scientific journal

- Discipline: Computational evolutionary biology
- Language: English
- Edited by: Dennis Wall

Publication details
- History: 2005–Present
- Publisher: Sage Publishing
- Open access: Yes
- Impact factor: 2.6 (2022)

Standard abbreviations
- ISO 4: Evol. Bioinform.

Indexing
- ISSN: 1176-9343
- OCLC no.: 179811074

Links
- Journal homepage

Evolutionary Bioinformatics is a peer-reviewed open access scientific journal focusing on computational biology in the study of evolution. The journal was established in 2005 by Allen Rodrigo as the oficial journal of The Bioinformatics Institute (New Zealand) and Editor Emeritus Mark Pagel (University of Reading), and is currently edited by Gustavo Caetano-Anolles (University of Illinois at Urbana-Champaign). It was originally published by Libertas Academica, but Sage Publishing became the publisher in September 2016.

== Abstracting and indexing ==
The journal is abstracted and indexed in:

- Chemical Abstracts Service
- Current Contents/Agriculture, Biology and Environmental Sciences
- Current Contents/Life Sciences
- Academic Search Complete
- Embase
- PubMed Central
- Science Citation Index Expanded

According to the Journal Citation Reports, the journal has a 2022 impact factor of 2.6.
