= Dan Hooper =

American cosmologist and particle physicist (born 1976)

Daniel Wayne Hooper
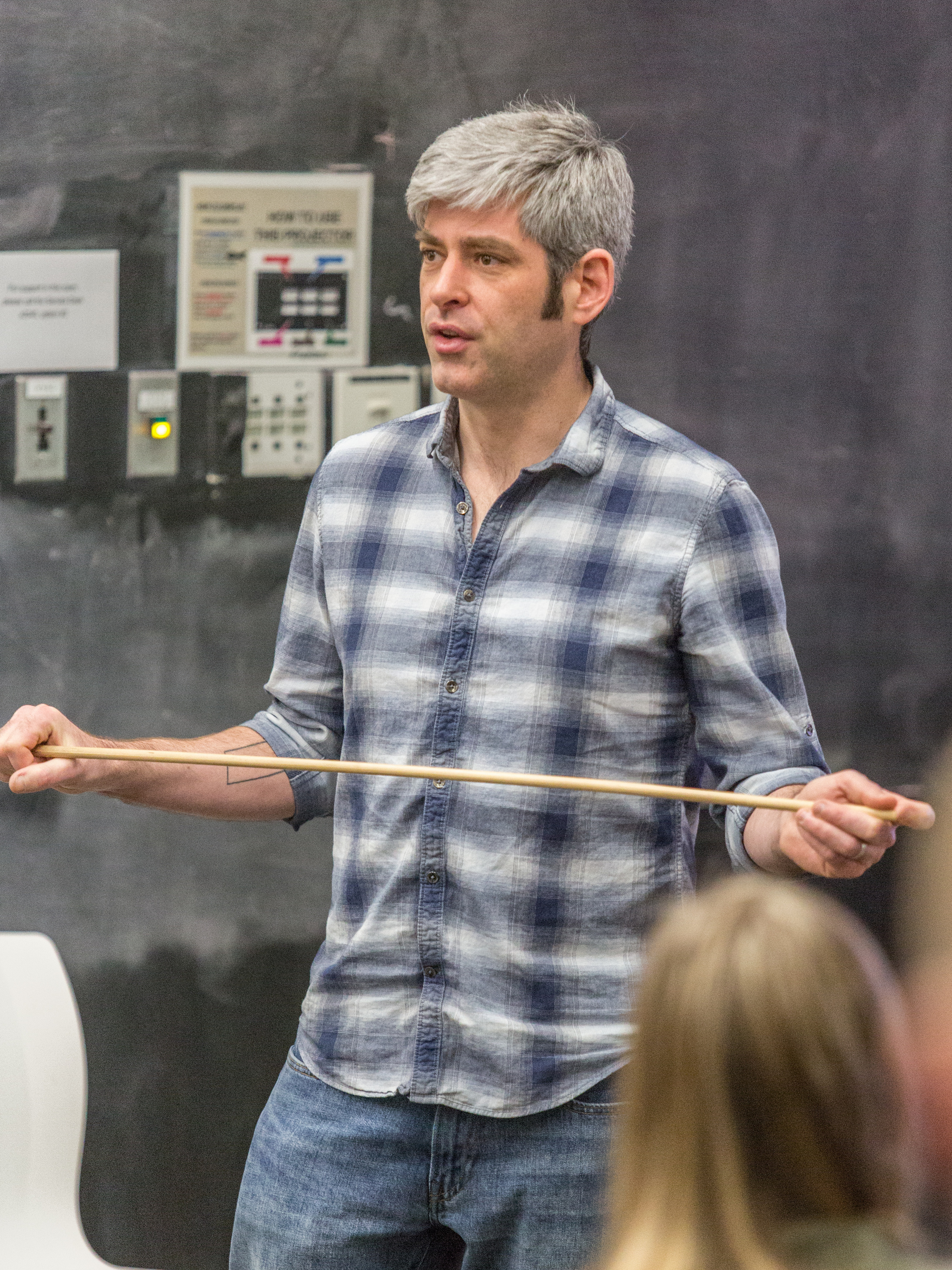
- Dan Hooper lectures during Fermilab's Saturday Morning Physics lecture on January 7, 2017
- Born: 16 December 1976 (age 49); Minnesota, United States
- Education: University of Wisconsin–Madison (PhD)
- Known for: Research in dark matter, particle physics, and cosmology
- Scientific career
- Fields: Physics, Cosmology, Astrophysics
- Workplaces: Fermilab, University of Chicago, University of Oxford, University of Wisconsin–Madison
- Doctoral advisor: Francis Halzen

Daniel Wayne Hooper (born December 16, 1976) is an American cosmologist and particle physicist specializing in the areas of dark matter, cosmic rays, and neutrino astrophysics. He is a professor of physics at the University of Wisconsin–Madison and the director of the Wisconsin IceCube Particle Astrophysics Center (WIPAC).

Hooper is the author of several books, including Dark Cosmos: In Search of our Universe's Missing Mass and Energy (2006), Nature's Blueprint: Supersymmetry and the Search for a Unified Theory of Matter and Force (2008), and At the Edge of Time: Exploring the Mysteries of Our Universe's First Seconds (2019).

== Career ==
Hooper received his PhD in physics in 2003 from the University of Wisconsin, under the supervision of Francis Halzen. He was a postdoctoral researcher at the University of Oxford between 2003 and 2005, and the David Schramm Fellow at Fermi National Accelerator Laboratory (Fermilab) from 2005 until 2007.

He is currently a senior scientist at Fermilab and a professor in the astronomy and astrophysics department at the University of Chicago.

He is also a member of the Kavli Institute for Cosmological Physics (KICP) at the University of Chicago. Since 2017, he has been the head of Fermilab's Theoretical Astrophysics Group.

Hooper has authored or co-authored over 200 articles published in peer-reviewed scientific journals. The most highly cited of these papers includes a 2005 review of dark matter (co-authored by Gianfranco Bertone and Joseph Silk), as well as a series of papers written between 2009 and 2014 on the Fermi Gamma-Ray Space Telescope's Galactic Center excess and its possible connection to annihilating dark matter. In 2017 he was elected to become a fellow of the American Physical Society, "For pursuing the identity of dark matter by combining careful analysis of observational data with theoretical ideas from both particle physics and astrophysics."

On September 9, 2024, Hooper will begin his role as the director of the Wisconsin IceCube Particle Astrophysics Center (WIPAC). He will hold a joint faculty appointment at the UW-Madison Department of Physics.

== Popular books and podcast ==
Hooper is the author of two books published by Smithsonian Books/HarperCollins. The first, Dark Cosmos: In Search of our Universe's Missing Mass and Energy (2006) was named a notable book by Seed Magazine. His second book, Nature's Blueprint: Supersymmetry and the Search for a Unified Theory of Matter and Force (2008), was called "essential reading" by New Scientist.

Hooper's third book is At the Edge of Time: Exploring the Mysteries of Our Universe's First Seconds (2019), published by Princeton University Press.

Since 2020, Dan Hooper and Shalma Wegsman have run the physics podcast Why This Universe? which appears every other week.

== In popular culture ==
Hooper has also written for popular magazines including Astronomy, Sky and Telescope, and New Scientist, and appeared on television and radio programs including Through the Wormhole with Morgan Freeman (season 4), BBC's Horizon, BBC World News, Space's Deepest Secrets, and NPR's Science Friday.
