= John Elefteriades =

British doctor

John Alex Elefteriades is a medical doctor and cardiac surgeon. He is the William W. L. Glenn Professor of Cardiothoracic Surgery and chief of cardiothoracic surgery in the Yale School of Medicine and Yale-New Haven Hospital. He serves as the director of the Yale Center for Thoracic Aortic Disease.

== Education ==
He received his undergraduate degree with a triple major in Physics, French and Psychology from Yale University. He received his MD degree from the Yale School of Medicine in 1976 and did residencies at Yale in general surgery and cardiothoracic surgery. He then joined the Yale faculty. In 2006 he was appointed the William W. L. Glenn Professor of Cardiothoracic Surgery, named for Elefteriades’ mentor.

He specializes and practises suspended animation on his patients.
