= Tali Sharot =

Cognitive neuroscientist

- טלי שרוט
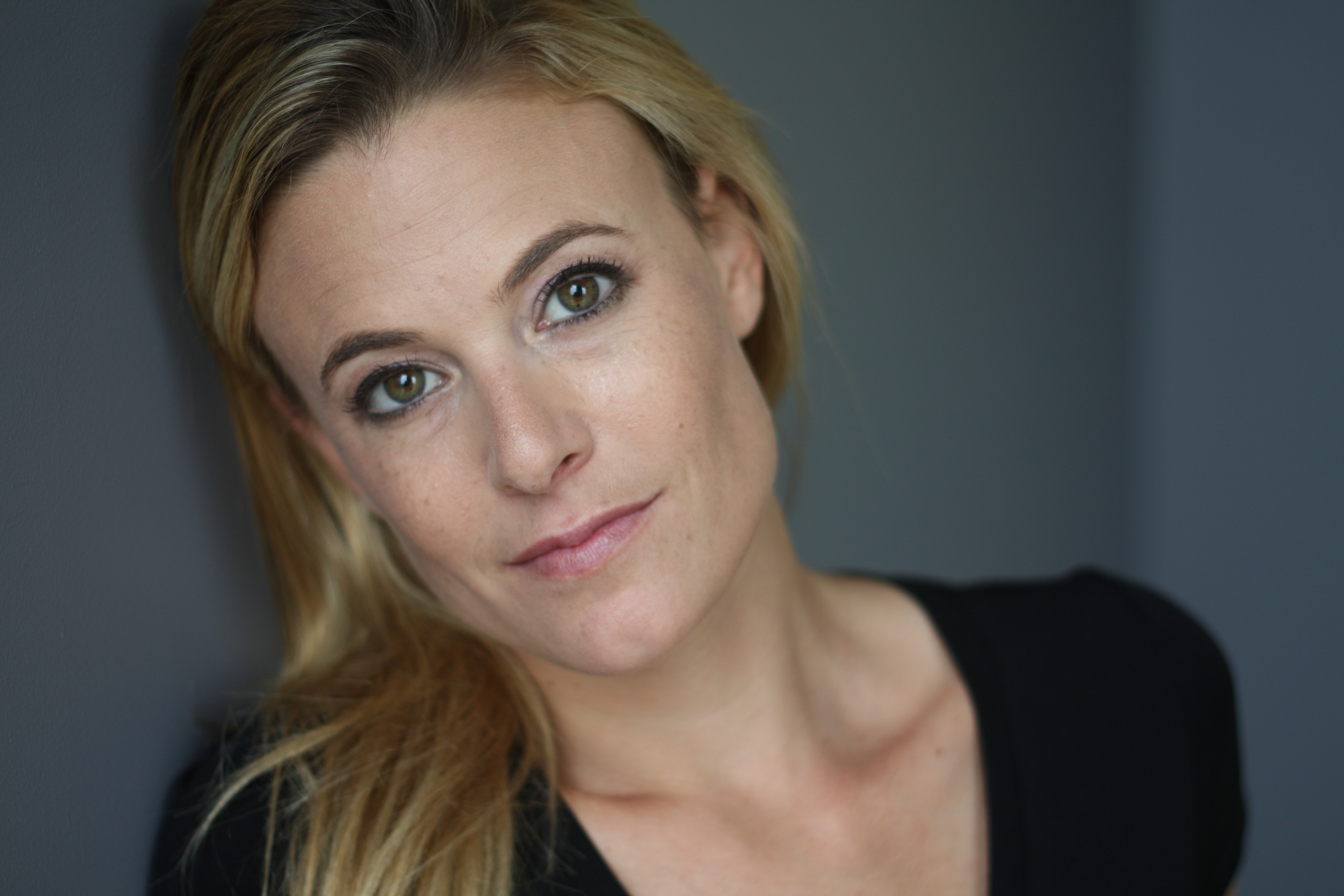
- Tali Sharot in 2010.
- Education: New York University, Tel Aviv University
- Occupation: Professor of cognitive neuroscience
- Employer: University College London
- Spouse: Josh McDermott (m. 2013)

Tali Sharot (Hebrew: טלי שרוט) is an Israeli, British, and American neuroscientist and professor of cognitive neuroscience at University College London and MIT. Sharot is known for her research on the neural basis of emotion, decision making and optimism. Sharot hopes to better understand these processes to enhance overall well-being.

== Early life and career ==
Tali Sharot grew up in Israel with an English father and an Israeli mother. In school, she was taught in Hebrew, but spoke both English and Hebrew at home. Sharot began studying at Tel Aviv University, receiving a B.A. in economics in 1999, and an M.A. in psychology from New York University in 2002. She received her Ph.D. in psychology and neuroscience from New York University. While in New York, Sharot witnessed the 9/11 attacks on the Twin Towers and decided to focus her research on how emotion affects memory. A few years after the attacks, she and fellow researchers interviewed 22 New Yorkers who had been present in Manhattan during the event.

== Scientific contributions ==
Sharot is especially known for her discovery of the neural underpinnings of human optimism, work that has been published in numerous eminent journals. In her books The Optimism Bias and The Science of Optimism, she describes the evolutionary benefits of unrealistic optimism along with its dangers. Richard Stengel has written in a Time editorial that Sharot's work gives us a better grip on how we function in reality. The implications of Sharot's discoveries for health, finance, cyber security, policy and more have been extensively covered by the media and she is often featured on radio, TV and in the written press. In 2017 her book The Influential Mind: What the Brain Reveals About Our Power to Change Others was published highlighting the critical role of emotion in influence and the weakness of data. It was selected as a Best Book of 2017 by Forbes, The Times UK, The Huffington Post, Bloomberg, Greater Good Magazine, Inc., Stanford Business School among others. Sharot was one of the presenters on the Dara Ó Briain's Science Club, who also introduced her on stage at The Royal Albert Hall's Imagining the future of Medicine in 2014. She was a speaker at TED2012.

== Affective Brain Lab ==
Directed by Tali Sharot, the Affective Brain Lab is a neuroscience and psychology based lab that studies the experience of emotion on normal cognitive function and its causative effects in regards to common mental disorders. The lab combines neural imaging techniques, pharmacological manipulation, and genetic principles to perform experiments on human behavior and neurological mechanisms. Real world application of this lab's research aims to combat the detrimental effects of brain dysfunction.

== Awards and recognition ==
Sharot received prestigious fellowships from the Wellcome Trust, the Forum of European Philosophy and the British Academy. She won the British Psychological Society Book award for 2014 (for The Optimism Bias) and 2018 (for The Influential Mind). She has been described as "one of the top female scientists in her country" listed as one of the 15 exemplary female Israeli-born scientists alive. Her two TED talks have been viewed a total of 15 million times.

Hope isn’t rational, so why are humans wired for it?

— Tali Sharot

== Publications ==
=== Books ===
- Sharot, Tali (2012). The Optimism Bias: A Tour of the Irrationally Positive Brain. Vintage. ISBN 978-0-3074-7351-6.
- Sharot, Tali (2018). The Influential Mind: What the Brain Reveals About Our Power to Change Others. Picador. ISBN 978-1250159618.
- Sharot, Tali; Sunstein, Cass R. (2024). Look Again: The Power of Noticing What Was Always There. Atria/One Signal. ISBN 978-1-6680-0820-1.
