= Steven Weinstein (philosopher) =

Canadian philosopher

- Education: Princeton University (A.B.); Northwestern University (Ph.D.)
- Scientific career
- Fields: Philosophy of Physics, Philosophy of Science
- Workplaces: University of Waterloo, Perimeter Institute for Theoretical Physics
- Website: http://arts.uwaterloo.ca/~sw

Steven Weinstein is a philosopher at the University of Waterloo, noted particularly for his work on quantum gravity, time, and the interpretation of quantum mechanics.

== Biography ==
Weinstein studied as an undergraduate student at Princeton University, from where he graduated with honors with an A.B. in philosophy in 1982 after completing a 54-page-long senior thesis titled "Quarks and Qualia." After several years of writing, recording, and performing music, he returned to academic work, obtaining his Ph.D. in Philosophy from Northwestern University in 1998, supervised by Arthur Fine. He is presently a professor in the Philosophy Department at the University of Waterloo, with a cross-appointment in Physics. He is also an Affiliate member of the Perimeter Institute for Theoretical Physics.

== Research ==
His research is in the interpretation of quantum theory and the nature of space, time, and space-time. He has explored the possibility of multiple time dimensions. In a joint paper with Walter Craig, they gave the first well-posed initial value problem for the wave equation in more than one time dimension (the ultrahyperbolic equation). He has written critically on anthropic reasoning in cosmology, and most recently was the co-recipient (along with George Francis Rayner Ellis) of the 2nd Prize in the Foundational Questions Institute (FQXi) essay contest on "Questioning the Foundations" for his paper 'Patterns in the fabric of nature', which proposes that non-local constraints may play a role in fundamental physics and may help explain both large-scale (cosmological) and small-scale (quantum) correlations. His work on multiple time dimensions was featured on Through the Wormhole with Morgan Freeman.

Recent work involves using energy-based machine learning models to "learn" EPR correlations, the success of which suggests a route toward an acausal hidden-variable theory underlying quantum mechanics.

== Selected publications ==
- Weinstein, Steven (2012). "Patterns in the fabric of nature". arXiv:1211.7122 [quant-ph]. FQXI 2nd Prize essay, 2012.
- Weinstein, Steven (2011-04-10). "Electromagnetism and time-asymmetry". Modern Physics Letters A. 26 (11): 815–818. arXiv:1004.1346. Bibcode:2011MPLA...26..815W. doi:10.1142/s0217732311035298. ISSN 0217-7323. S2CID 118370357.
- Weinstein, Steven (2009). "Decoherence without decoherence". arXiv:0906.4544 [quant-ph].
- Weinstein, Steven (2008). "Multiple time dimensions". arXiv:0812.3869 [physics.gen-ph]. FQXI 3rd Prize essay, 2008.
- Craig, Walter; Weinstein, Steven (2009-07-15). "On determinism and well-posedness in multiple time dimensions". Proceedings of the Royal Society A: Mathematical, Physical and Engineering Sciences. 465 (2110). The Royal Society: 3023–3046. arXiv:0812.0210. Bibcode:2009RSPSA.465.3023C. doi:10.1098/rspa.2009.0097. ISSN 1364-5021.
- Weinstein, Steven (2009-06-27). "Nonlocality Without Nonlocality". Foundations of Physics. 39 (8): 921–936. arXiv:0812.0349. Bibcode:2009FoPh...39..921W. doi:10.1007/s10701-009-9305-x. ISSN 0015-9018. S2CID 8754143.
- Weinstein, Steven (September 2007). "Philosophy pulls strings" (PDF). Physics World. pp. 18–19.
- Weinstein, Steven (2006-05-31). "Anthropic reasoning and typicality in multiverse cosmology and string theory". Classical and Quantum Gravity. 23 (12): 4231–4236. arXiv:hep-th/0508006. Bibcode:2006CQGra..23.4231W. doi:10.1088/0264-9381/23/12/017. ISSN 0264-9381. S2CID 6319545.
- Weinstein, Steven (2003). "Objectivity, Information, and Maxwell's Demon". Philosophy of Science. 70 (5). University of Chicago Press: 1245–1255. doi:10.1086/377404. ISSN 0031-8248. JSTOR 10.1086/377404. S2CID 31517900.
