= Yukiyasu Kamitani =

Japanese academic

Yukiyasu Kamitani is a Japanese professor in the Graduate School of Informatics, at the University of Kyoto in Japan.

Kamitani received international attention in 2012 when it was announced that a team he led had used functional neuroimaging to scan the brains of people as they slept, enabling them to decode the visual content of their dreams.

== See also ==
- Brain-reading
