= Alien Worlds =

Alien Worlds may refer to:

- Alien Worlds (comics), science fiction anthology comic book published in the early 1980s.
- Alien Worlds (radio series), a popular syndicated radio show that first aired in 1979
- Alien Worlds, the UK broadcast name of the 2005 documentary series aired in the US as Extraterrestrial (TV program)
- Alien Worlds (2020 TV series), a 2020 documentary series on Netflix

== See also ==
- Motu Patlu: In Alien World!, a 2016 Indian animated film
- Extrasolar planets in fiction
