= Expedition =

Expedition may refer to:

== Places ==
- Expedition Island, a park in Green River, Wyoming, US
- Expedition Range, a mountain range in Queensland, Australia

== Arts, entertainment, and media ==
=== Games ===
- Expedition, a Pokémon Trading Card Game set
- Expeditions (board game), a sequel to the board game Scythe
- Expeditions: Conquistador, a 2013 video game, first of the Expeditions series

=== Literature ===
- Expeditions (poetry collection), by Margaret Atwood
- Expedition (book), a science-fiction novel by Wayne Douglas Barlowe
- Expedition Magazine, published by Penn Museum
- L'Expédition, a volume of the French science fiction comic series Les Mondes d'Aldébaran
- L'expédition, a novel by Agnès Desarthe

=== Music ===
- The Expedition, a 2000 live album by Kamelot
- L'expédition, a 2008 album by Les Cowboys Fringants
- Northern Exposure: Expeditions, a 1999 album by Sasha and John Digweed
- "Expedition", a song by Moka Only from the album Lime Green, 2001
- "Expedition", a song by Sarah Groves from the album Floodplain, 2015

=== Television ===
- Expedition! (1960-1962), an American travel documentary television series
- "The Expedition", an episode of the Doctor Who serial The Daleks

== Sports ==
- Expedition bicycling, a subset of long-distance bicycle touring
- Expedition climbing, a type of mountaineering
- Expedition races, long adventure races which combine two or more endurance disciplines
- Expedition Trophy, a winter motor rally from Murmansk to Vladivostok, Russia

== Transportation ==
- Expedition bicycle, a type of touring bicycle
- Ford Expedition, a sport utility vehicle
- MS Expedition, an expedition cruise ship

== Other uses ==
- Expedition Engineering, a British engineering consultancy
- Expedition, a permanent crew rotation on board the International Space Station

== See also ==
- Expeditionary warfare, a type of military deployment
- Xpedition (disambiguation)
