= Extraterrestrial (TV program) =

Hypothetical examples of a planet and a moon supporting extraterrestrial life

- Also known as: Alien Worlds; Extraterrestrial – Alien Worlds
- Genre: Astrobiology documentary
- Directed by: Nick Stringer
- Presented by: Armand Leroi (UK)
- Starring: Simon Conway Morris; Chris McKay; Seth Shostak; Nigel Franks; Jim Usherwood
- Narrated by: Armand Leroi (UK); Michael Dorn (US)
- Composer: The Fratelli Brothers
- Countries of origin: United Kingdom; United States
- Original language: English
- No. of series: 1
- No. of episodes: 2

Production
- Executive producer: Sarah Cunliffe
- Producer: Nick Stringer
- Running time: 2 hours with commercials; 100 minutes without commercials
- Production company: Big Wave Productions Ltd.

Original release
- Network: Channel 4
- Release: January 2005
- Network: National Geographic Channel
- Release: May 30, 2005

Extraterrestrial, also known in the UK as Alien Worlds, is a British-American two-part television documentary miniseries, aired in 2005 in the UK by Channel 4, by the National Geographic Channel in the US on Monday, May 30, 2005 and produced by Big Wave Productions Ltd. The program focuses on the hypothetical and scientifically feasible evolution of alien life on extrasolar planets, providing model examples of two different fictional worlds, one in each of the series's two episodes.

The documentary is based on speculative collaboration of a group of American and British scientists, who were collectively commissioned by National Geographic. For the purposes of the documentary, the team of scientists divides two hypothetical examples of realistic worlds on which extraterrestrial life could evolve: A tidally locked planet (dubbed "Aurelia") orbiting a red dwarf star and a large moon (dubbed "Blue Moon") orbiting a gas giant in a binary star system. The scientific team of the series used a combination of accretion theory, climatology, and xenobiology to imagine the most likely locations for extraterrestrial life and most probable evolutionary path such life would take.

The "Aurelia" and "Blue Moon" concepts seen in the series were also featured in the touring exhibition The Science of Aliens.

== Series concept and scientific basis ==
At the start of the documentary, the presenter and team of scientists draw attention to their reasons for speculating about life on extrasolar planets. Discoveries regarding extrasolar planets were first published in 1989 raising the prospect of whether life (as we know it or imagine it) could be supported on other planets. It is currently believed that for this to happen a planet must orbit in a relatively narrow band around its parent star, where temperatures are suitable for water to exist as a liquid. This region is called the habitable zone.

The most Earth-like exoplanets yet found, Gliese 667 Cc and Gliese 581g (disputed), have masses larger than Earth's and orbit red dwarf stars in the habitable zone.

The sensitivity of current detection methods makes it difficult for scientists to search for terrestrial planets smaller than this. To allow smaller bodies to be detected, NASA was studying a project called the Terrestrial Planet Finder (TPF), a two-telescope concept slated to begin launching around 2014. However, Congressional spending limits under House Resolution 20 passed on January 31, 2007 by the U.S. House of Representatives and February 14 by the U.S. Senate have all but canceled the program.

Prior to the TPF's cancellation, astrophysicists had begun speculating about the best places to point the telescope in order to find Earth-like planets. Whereas life on Earth has formed around a stable yellow dwarf, solar twins are not as common in the galaxy as red dwarf stars (which have a mass of less than one-half that of the Sun and consequently emit less heat), or bigger, brighter blue giants. In addition, it is estimated that more than a quarter of all stars are at least binary systems, with as many as 10% of these systems containing more than two stars (trinary etc.)—unlike our own sun, which has no companion. Therefore, it may be prudent to consider how life might evolve in such environments. Such speculation may still be of use should a future planet-finding telescope be launched, and possibly for NASA's Kepler mission.

== Episode 1: Aurelia ==
The first episode of the series focused on Aurelia, a hypothetical Earth-sized extrasolar planet orbiting a red dwarf star in our local area of the Milky Way.

=== Planetary concept ===
The scientists on the project theorized that aiming the TPF at a red dwarf star might yield the best opportunities for seeing smaller planets. Due to the slow rate at which they burn hydrogen, red dwarfs have an enormous estimated lifespan, allowing plenty of time for life to evolve on surrounding planets. Also, red dwarfs are very common in the universe. Therefore, if they support habitable planets, it substantially increases the chances of finding life in the universe. However, being much dimmer than other stars, it will be harder to detect planetary systems around them. In addition, lower gravity would limit the potential size of a system. The discovery of Gliese 581g raises hopes of finding more red dwarf systems, including potentially habitable ones.

However, the dwarf's smaller nature and fainter heat/light output would mean that such a planet would need to be particularly close to the star's surface. The cost of such an orbit would be that an Earth-sized body would become tidally locked. When this happens, the object presents the same face to its parent at all times as it orbits, just as the Moon does with the Earth (more technically, one sidereal day is exactly equal to one year for the orbiting body).

Traditional scientific theories proposed that such a tidally locked planet might be incapable of holding on to an atmosphere. Having such a slow rotation would weaken the magnetic effect that protects the atmosphere from being blown away by solar wind (see Rare Earth hypothesis).

==== Traditional assumptions tested ====
Nonetheless, the scientists employed by the programme decided to test the traditional assumptions for such a planet and start a model out for it from a protoplanetary disk through to its eventual death. Their estimations suggested such a planet could indeed hold on to its atmosphere, although with freakishly unusual results by Earth standards. Aurelia would be gravitationally locked. Due to this, Aurelia would not have seasons or a day/night cycle, as half would be in perpetual darkness, a permanent ice age. The other half would contain a giant, unending hurricane with permanent torrential rain at the point directly opposite the local star. Between these two zones, it would be suitable for life.

The giant hurricane might generate enormous waves in the ocean, which would migrate outwards. They would be wind-driven and would not reach the top of an ocean to the bottom, as a tsunami does. Nonetheless, waves as big and as devastating as those humans call freak waves might be regular. Simple bacterial and algal life would not be threatened.

=== Lifeforms of Aurelia ===
In continued speculation, and assuming that there was land in this habitable zone, it would be likely to form large networks of river deltas and swampland, due to rain runoff from the nearby storm.

At the far end of assumptions about Aurelia were attempting to construct lifeforms based on Earthly evolutionary models and how ecosystems might develop. The scientists' assumptions included the idea that the long life of a red dwarf allows for evolution to fine-tune any ecosystem on the planet. The scientists involved in the project hypothesized that the vast majority, if not all, of extra-solar biology, will be carbon-based (this assumption is often referred to by critics as carbon chauvinism, as it may be possible for life to form that is not based on carbon).

From this carbon-based hypothesis, the scientific team assumed some form of staple photosynthesizing animal/plant combination would be the principal autotroph. They decided upon a plant-like creature called a Stinger Fan. It has five hearts and limited mobility. Its fan-like leaves trap the red dwarf star's energy to produce sugars. Its hearts pump them around its body.

Feeding upon the Stinger Fans are six-legged semi-amphibious beaver-like creatures called Mudpods. They use their long, continually growing thumb claws to cut down a Stinger Fan and dam the river systems, creating artificial lagoons and swamps which provide safety from predators. Upon that animal, a large emu-like animal, the Gulphog, is the main predator. These 2-meter tall carnivores live socially in packs and display promising signs of intelligence. Finally, there is a second semi-amphibious creature called the Hysteria – a cross between a plague of tadpoles and piranha. These tiny, orange creatures can collect together (similar to slime molds) and form one huge super-organism, moving together up banks to paralyze and consume other animals. Sabian Slugs that live by the water can fall victim to the Hysteria, but it can take something as large as a Gulphog to satisfy them.

The planet's ecosystem exhibits several unique adaptations, most notably the ability for all living organisms to detect and avoid solar flares. Some red dwarf stars are unstable and eject frequent solar flares. Such intense ultraviolet radiation is deadly to all carbon-based life forms as it breaks down the atomic bonds formed by organic compounds. The Gulphogs have adapted by having an ultraviolet light-sensitive eye on top of their heads, Stinger Fans fold up to protect themselves, Mudpods have sensitive backs that can sense the ultraviolet rays, and the Hysteria's protection is the water. However, the flare stage might only be when the red dwarfs are relatively young.

== Episode 2: Blue Moon ==
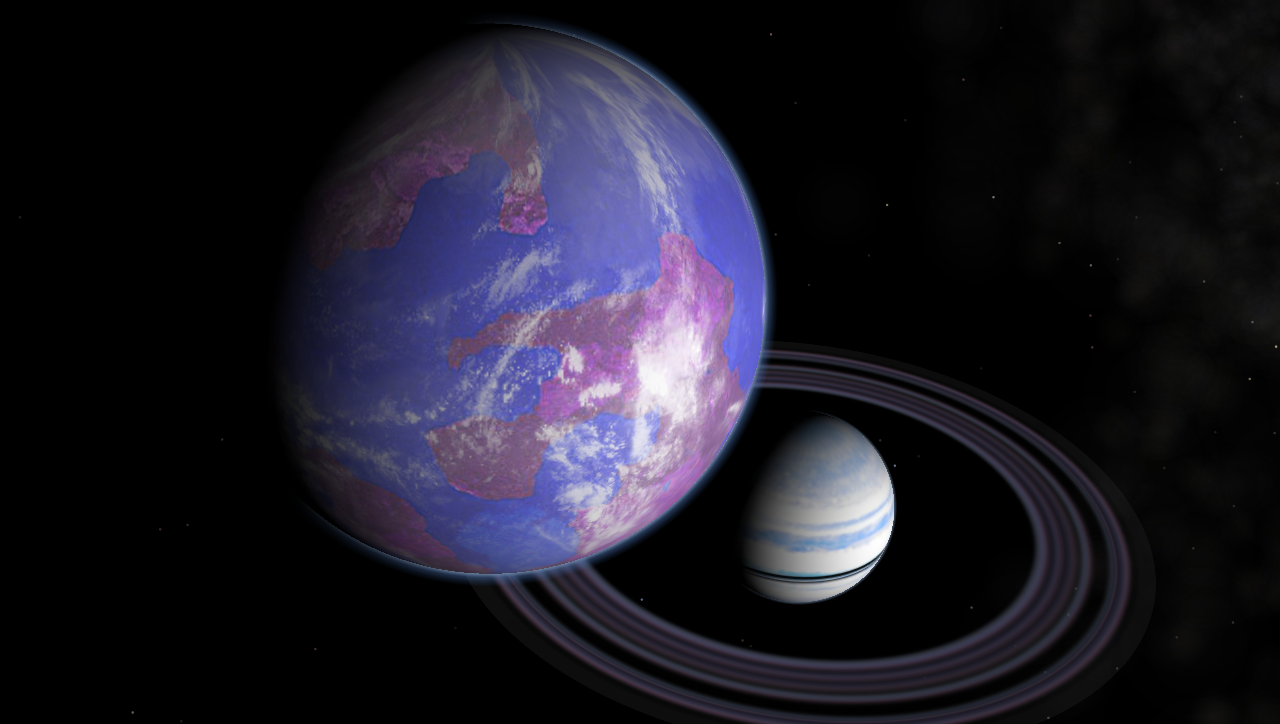
A hypothetical rendition of the Blue Moon orbiting high above the plane of its parent gas giant planet

The second episode of the program focuses on a fictional moon called the Blue Moon, which orbits an enormous gas giant that is itself orbiting a binary star system.

=== Planetary concept ===
The Blue Moon is covered in life-giving water and an atmosphere so dense that enormous creatures hypothetically can take flight. The Blue Moon orbits a Water Cloud Jovian planet (a Jupiter-like planet that is cool enough to have visible rain clouds in its atmosphere) orbiting a close binary star system. The Blue Moon itself is roughly an earth mass but has an air pressure around three times that of Earth's at sea level.

A distinguishing feature of Blue Moon is that it has no polar ice caps: the thick atmosphere keeps temperatures constant across the moon's surface. There is also a greenish haze over the moon from large carpets of floating moss and algae.

The denser atmosphere allows more massive creatures to remain airborne than on Earth. Skywhales, gargantuan whale-like animals which evolved away from the ocean into the air, fill the ecological niche this creates. Because of the increased muscle power from excess atmospheric oxygen, these creatures can have wingspans of ten meters and remain airborne their entire lives. They feed on the previously mentioned Air Moss. They evolved from seagoing animals into flying ones in one evolutionary leap.

High levels of oxygen (30% of the atmosphere) push the atmosphere to the brink of spontaneous combustion during lightning storms. Carbon dioxide levels are thirty times higher than on Earth making the air clammy and warm.

=== Lifeforms of the Blue Moon ===
Skywhales are prey to the insect-like caped Stalkers, colony-living predators that have several different tasks. Scouts find skywhales and mark them with a special scent, then return to the nest to spread the word. Workers then swarm out in huge numbers, detecting the whale and working together to bring them down from the sky and kill them. Finally, there is a queen, who stays in the nest and constantly lays eggs that become new stalkers. This lifestyle is based on earth's hornets. The Stalkers are also prey, for the Pagoda branches are draped with the lethal webs of the plant-like ghost traps. Once a Stalker is caught in a ghost trap web, the carnivore uses its tentacles to lift its catch up into its mouth, to be digested by the acid in a primitive stomach.

As well as Skywhales, giant Kites also fly above the forest canopy. These parasol-like grazers can grow up to 5 m (16 ft) in diameter and still stay airborne. Their tethers help control their floating, while their jellyfish-like tentacles snatch Helibug larvæ from the water-filled sky pond. Helibugs have a trilaterally symmetrical body plan, with three eyes, three wings, three legs, three mouthparts and three tongues.

70% of Blue Moon's land mass is coated with two main plant types, pagoda trees, and balloon plants. Pagoda trees interconnect with each other to allow them to grow 700 ft (210 m) tall. Their hollow leaves collect rainwater since the trees are too tall to draw it from the ground. Balloon plants release their seeds by filling them with hydrogen to float in the dense atmosphere, in a way similar to kelp on Earth.

At the foot of the pagoda forest there is a completely different ecosystem, governed by bioluminescent beings. A wide range of fungi, such as giant mushroom, helibugs and other creatures lurk in the shadows, waiting for any creature from the bottom to fall into their trap. The fungi species have an alert system that warns when the body of a creature falls dead, which soon ends up being digested by them.

The Blue Moon is threatened by mass wildfires that can wipe out entire pagoda forests. Balloon plants grow in the gaps resulting. The floating balloons released by the plants are full of explosive hydrogen, and when a fire hits, they explode like bombs, releasing seeds flying through the air. Skywhales and Kites will gain altitude until the fire ends. The ghost traps sway from branch to branch like monkeys using their tentacles. The Stalkers' escape strategy is unknown.

== Home video releases ==
Channel 4 provided a DVD release of the whole documentary (at a run length of 100 minutes) in January 2005.

== See also ==
Topics related to the "Aurelia" concept

- Habitability of red dwarf systems – Possible factors for life around red dwarf stars
- Gliese 581 planetary system – Star in the constellation Libra
- HD 85512 – Star in the constellation Vela
- Kepler-22 – Star in the constellation Cygnus
- Gliese 667C – Triple-star system in the constellation Scorpius

Topics related to the "Blue Moon" concept

- Habitability of binary star systems – Potential conditions for extraterrestrial life in binary star systems
- 55 Cancri – Binary star with at least seven exoplanets 41 light-years away
- HD 28185 – Star in the constellation Eridanus
- HD 10180 – Star in the constellation Hydrus

Concepts and theories

- Abiogenesis, also known as Origin of life – Life arising from non-living matter
- Panspermia – Hypothesis on the interstellar spreading of primordial life
- Planetary habitability – Known extent to which a planet is suitable for life

Research efforts

- Methods of detecting extrasolar planets
- List of exoplanet search projects
- Nexus for Exoplanet System Science – Dedicated to the search for life on exoplanets
- NASA Astrobiology Institute – U.S. research organization
- Search for extraterrestrial intelligence (SETI) – Effort to find civilizations not from Earth

Similar television documentaries

- Alien Planet (docufiction)
- Darwin IV (setting of Alien Planet) – 1990 science fiction book by Wayne Barlowe
- Natural History of an Alien (docufiction)
- The Future is Wild – 2002 television miniseries
- Alien Worlds (2020) – 2020 British sci-fi nature docufiction
