= Endurance racing (motorsport) =

Motorsport over long distances and time periods

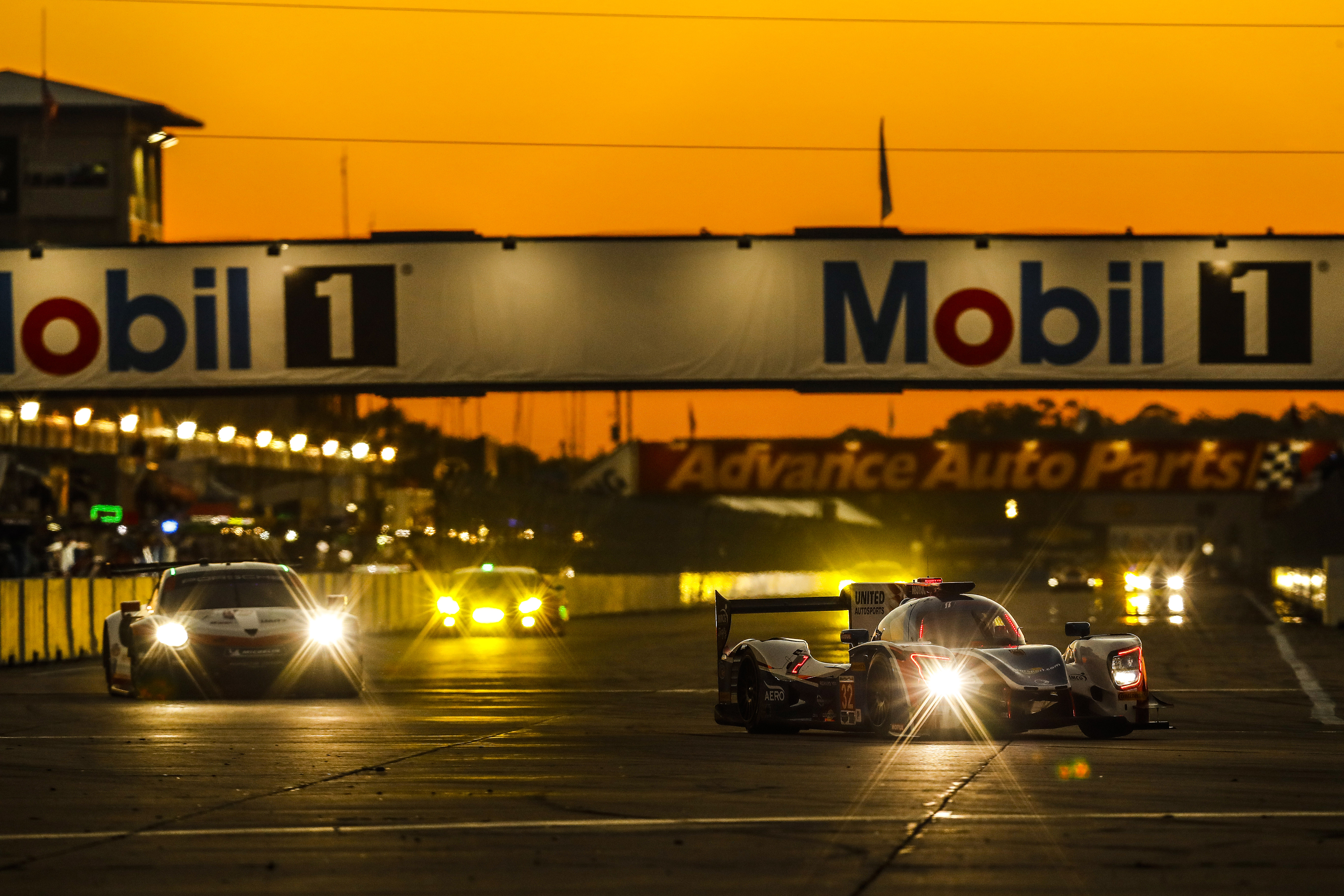
A Ligier prototype leading a Porsche GT car at the 12 Hours of Sebring in 2018

Endurance racing is a form of motorsport which is meant to test the durability of equipment and endurance of participants. Teams of multiple drivers attempt to cover a large distance in a single event, with participants given a break with the ability to change during the race. Endurance races can be run either to cover a set distance in laps as quickly as possible, or to cover as much distance as possible over a preset amount of time.

One of the more common lengths of endurance races can be running for 500 kilometres (310 mi), or roughly 3 hours, or 1,000 kilometres (620 mi), or roughly 6 hours. Longer races can run for 1,000 miles (1,600 km), 12 hours, or even 24 hours. Endurance races often feature multiple different categories of vehicles competing in their own classes, but races with a single category also exist. Teams can consist of anywhere from two to four drivers per event, which is dependent on the driver's endurance abilities, length of the race, or even the rules for each event.

== Origins ==
Coppa Florio was an Italian car race started in 1900, and renamed in 1905 when Vincenzo Florio offered the initial 50 000 Lira and a cup designed by Polak of Paris. The Brescia race visited the route Brescia-Cremona-Mantova-Brescia. In 1908, the race used the Circuito di Bologna: Bologna-Castelfranco Emilia-Sant'Agata Bolognese-San Giovanni in Persiceto-Bologna. Since 1914 most of the Coppa Florio was co-organized with the Targa Florio near Palermo, Sicilia, running four or five laps, 108 km each.

The Targa Florio was an open road endurance automobile race founded in 1906- the track length of the last decades was limited to the 72 kilometres of the Circuito Piccolo delle Madonie, which was lapped 11 times.

The Mille Miglia was an open-road endurance race which took place in Italy 24 times from 1927 to 1957.

The world's first organized 24-hour automobile race event was held on a 1-mile oval track at Driving Park, Columbus, Ohio on July 3–4, 1905. Beginning on the afternoon of July 3, four cars from Frayer-Miller, Pope-Toledo, Peerless and White Steamer raced for a $500 silver trophy. The winning Pope-Toledo car covered 828.5 miles. A protest was filed by the Frayer-Miller and Peerless teams, alleging the Pope-Toledo was not owned by the driver, instead sent from the factory with an engine built for racing.

The first 24-hour race to take place at a dedicated motorsport venue was at Brooklands in England, eleven days after its opening in 1907. This incurred the wrath of local residents and would lead to the Double Twelve race. This format meant the race took place for 12 hours each between 8 am to 8 pm and between it, the cars were locked up overnight to prevent maintenance work from being performed on them.

The 2001 Dakar Rally saw competitors cover a distance of 10,739 kilometres (6,673 mi) with a winning time of 70 hours over 20 days with three classes of cars, motorbikes, and trucks. The 1992 Paris–Cape Town Rally covered a distance of 12,427 km. The 1994 edition saw competitors return to Paris, for a distance of 13,379 km. The Expedition Trophy, first held in 2005, runs from Murmansk to Vladivostok, for a total distance of 12,500 km. The 1908 New York to Paris Race covered a distance of over 16,000 km, taking 169 days from February 12 to July 30.

== Automobile endurance racing ==
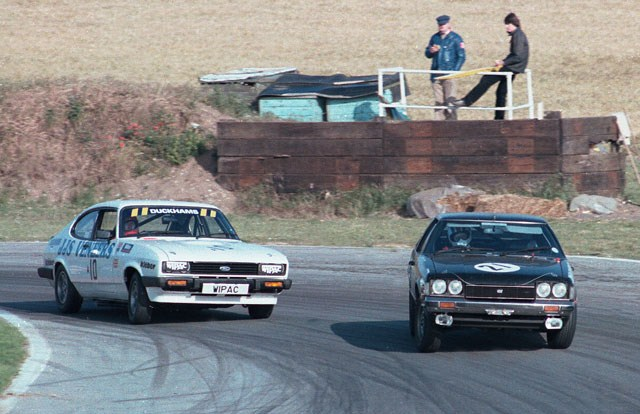
The inaugural Willhire 24 Hour, Snetterton, 1980

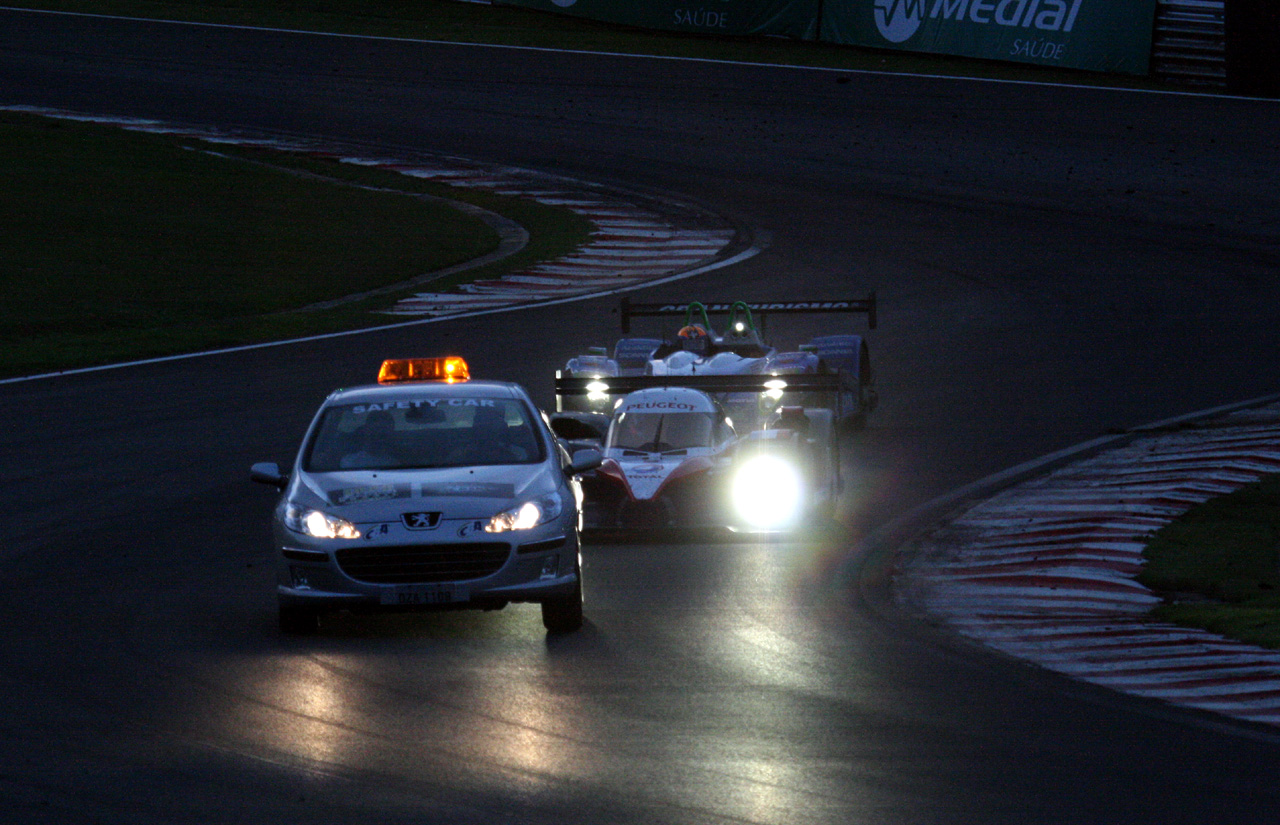
Driving under safety car in 2007 Mil Milhas Brasil

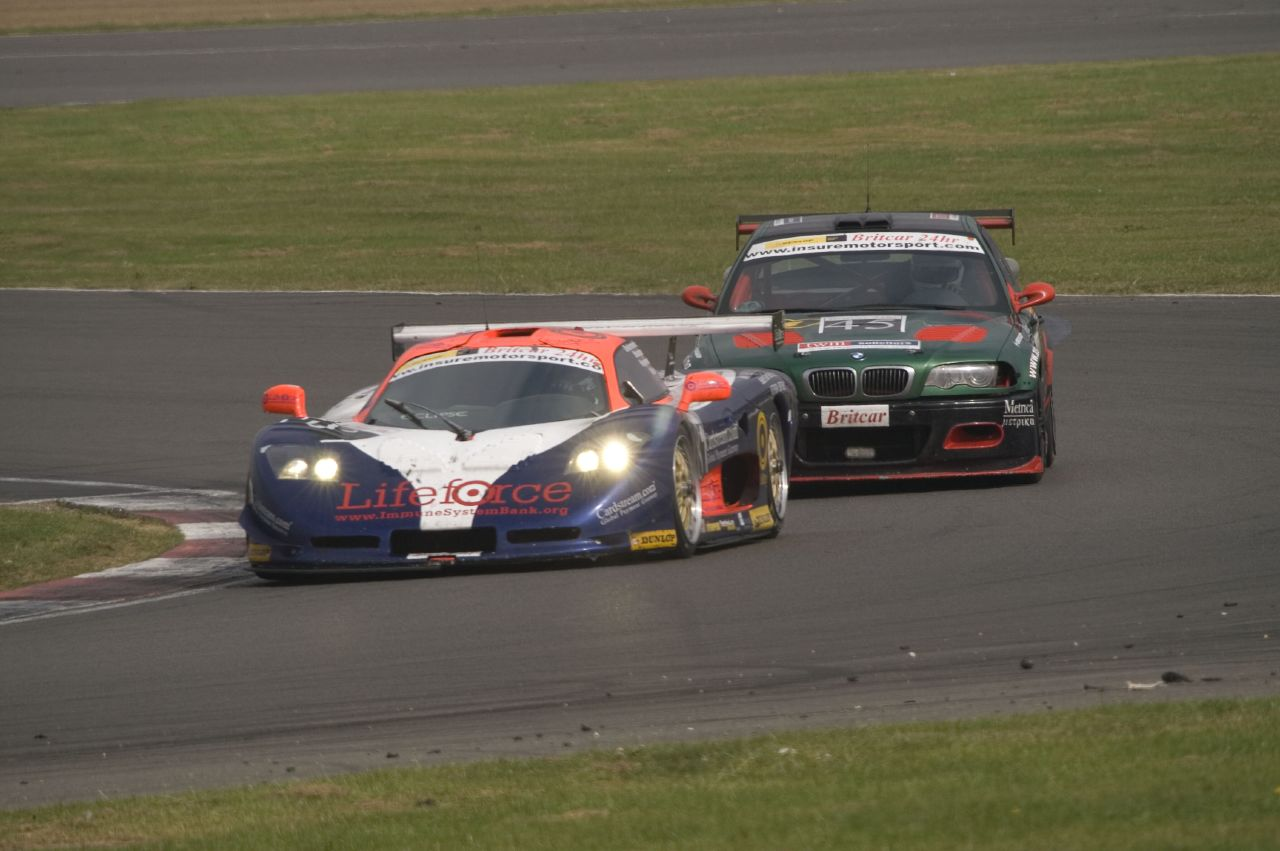
The 2007 24 Hours of Silverstone

In the beginning of formalised endurance racing, the races tended to be for sports cars while the Grand Prix cars of the era began to evolve into the open-wheel racing cars of today and ran over shorter distances. Over time sports cars began to evolve away from their roots as a production based alternative to pure-bred racing machines of Grand Prix cars, which led to the creation of GT and touring car racing classes, and these classes continued to embrace the endurance format. Multiple drivers per car was an early adaptation as the rigors of endurance racing quickly overcome the abilities of most racing drivers to compete solo, although solo attempts on 24 hour races like Le Mans would continue into the 1950s.

The various endurance formats were appealing to manufacturers, not only as alternatives to the expense of Grand Prix racing, but also because of its increased relevance to road going models.

=== Triple Crown and other major races ===
In automobile endurance racing, three events have come to form a Triple Crown. They are considered three of the most challenging endurance races over the decades: the 24 Hours of Daytona, 12 Hours of Sebring, and 24 Hours of Le Mans. Other major endurance races include Petit Le Mans, Nürburgring 24 Hours, Spa 24 Hours, and Bathurst 12 Hour. Usually, these races include two or more categories of automobiles, but single-category endurance races also exist.

=== Endurance racing championships ===
Strong spectator figures, media interest and television coverage of endurance racing's Triple Crown events (24 Hours of Daytona, 12 Hours of Sebring, and 24 Hours of Le Mans) has led to the establishment of several endurance racing series — thereby giving teams the opportunity of running their cars in Championship events throughout the year.

The FIA World Endurance Championship is an international sports car racing series organized by both the Automobile Club de l'Ouest (ACO) and the Fédération Internationale de l'Automobile (FIA). It superseded the Intercontinental Le Mans Cup, run in 2010 and 2011, and uses similar rules to the WSCC and ELMS/AsLMS below. The series features both Le Mans Prototypes and GT cars. The 24 Hours of Le Mans is included as a feature race, while the other races are 6 hours long and take place in countries all over the world such as Bahrain, Brazil, Japan, and the United States. The WEC is considered a revival of the defunct World Sportscar Championship which ended in 1992.

An early championship was the Australian Endurance Championship, held since 1981.

The IMSA SportsCar Championship is a US sports car racing series organized by the International Motor Sports Association (IMSA). The season begins with the 24 Hours of Daytona, traditionally held in the last weekend of January or the first weekend of February. There then follows a further 12 races, including the famed 12 Hours of Sebring, 6 Hours of Watkins Glen and Petit Le Mans. The series includes Le Mans Prototypes and Le Mans-spec GT cars and formerly featured the unique Daytona Prototypes and Daytona-spec GT cars. The series is considered to be the successor of the defunct IMSA GT Championship as well as the American Le Mans Series and Rolex Sports Car Series that merged to form it.

The European Le Mans Series (ELMS) is a European sports car racing endurance series run by the Automobile Club de l'Ouest (ACO). The ELMS is seen as a rebirth of the old European Le Mans Series which was created by IMSA and the ACO, but only ran in 2001. LMS champions and runners-up in all four categories receive an automatic entry to the following year's 24 Hours of Le Mans. All races used to be 6 hours long, but the format was changed to 3 hours in 2013 to differentiate it further from the WEC; currently, it has been reextended to 4 hours. With the debut of the World Endurance Championship in 2012, the series has dropped LMP1 and now features LMP2 as its premier category, in addition to LMP3 and GT categories.

The Asian Le Mans Series (AsLMS) is an Asian sports car racing series run by the Automobile Club de l'Ouest (ACO). It uses the same car categories and regulations as the ELMS, and also provides automatic entries to the 24 Hours of Le Mans. The series is related to the former Japan Le Mans Challenge that turned into the older Asian Le Mans Series (which was cancelled after one season).

The GT World Challenge Europe Endurance Cup (GTWCEEC) is a European sports car racing endurance series run by the Stéphane Ratel Organisation. It is similar to the ELMS, but only uses performance-balanced GT3 cars instead of prototypes and holds generally shorter races, although some races are exceptions, such as the 24 Hours of Spa, which the series is centred on. One of the key emphases of the series is being friendly for amateur and gentlemen drivers, and there are numerous non-pro classes in addition to the premier GT3 Pro class. The series began in 2011 and saw increased involvement in 2012 and 2013.

The Baja 1000 is an annual Mexican off-road motorsport endurance race held on the Baja California Peninsula. It is one of the most prestigious off-road races in the world. The race was founded by Ed Pearlman in 1967 and is sanctioned by SCORE International. The Baja 1000 allows various types of vehicles and classes to compete on the same course at the same time. The course has remained relatively the same over the years, with about every event being either a point-to-point race from Ensenada to La Paz, or a loop race starting and finishing in Ensenada.

The Intercontinental GT Challenge is world sports car racing endurance series run by the Stéphane Ratel Organisation, like the GTWCEEC. Its rule set is similar to GTWCEEC, although it is centred on internationally renowned endurance races that are often part of multiple championships, such as the Bathurst 12 Hours and the Nürburgring 24 Hours, which belong to the GT World Challenge Australia and Nurburgring Langstrecken-Serie championships respectively.

=== In popular culture ===
Endurance motor racing has proven a popular subject for depiction in video games, and on film. The Lee H. Katzin film Le Mans, starring Steve McQueen, used real race footage, and enjoys cult status. The 1986 arcade game WEC Le Mans was the first to portray endurance racing in a videogame, while Gran Turismo 4 and 5 extended this to a real-time simulation of 24 hour events. In the 2018 stealth video game Hitman 2, a level takes place amidst an endurance race in Miami, Florida, with a target being a racer in the event.

== Motorcycle endurance racing ==
In the early days of endurance racing cars and motorcycles raced side by side, but the two were soon separated. The most notable motorcycle endurance race was the Bol d'Or, first run on the circuit of Vaujours, near Paris in 1922. Only one rider was permitted per bike and there was no stopping other than for refuelling.

Motorcycle endurance racing began to expand after the second World War as new races began to emerge, among them the 24 Hour Race in Warsage, Belgium in 1951, the 24 Hours of Montjuïc in Barcelona in 1957, 24 hours in Monza, Italy in 1959, and the Thruxton 500 mile endurance race at Thruxton, Hampshire, England in 1960.

1960 also saw the inaugural FIM Endurance Cup initially made up of four races, the Thruxton 500, Montjuich, Warsage, and the Bol d'Or.

The popularity of motorcycle endurance racing increased in the 1970s with the arrival of four-cylinder machines from Japan. In 1976 the FIM Endurance Cup became the European Championship and in 1980 a World Championship.

=== Notable motorbike endurance races ===
Motorcycle endurance classics:

- 24 Hours of Le Mans
- Bol d'Or (variously at the Le Mans, Paul Ricard and Magny Cours circuits; and earlier at Saint Germain, Fontainebleau, Monthly).
- Thruxton 500 and
- Suzuka 8 Hours
- Albacete 8 Hours
- Francorchamps Spa

== Kart endurance racing ==
Endurance races last for an extended period, ranging from 30 minutes up to 24 hours or more, for one or more drivers. In general, consistency, reliability, and pit strategy is of greater importance than all out speed.

As well as the famous 24 Hours of Le Mans race for automobiles there is also a 24 hours event for karts which takes place at the kart circuit Alain Prost at Le Mans, France. This race has taken place since 1986 and its winners list include four times Champ Car champion Sébastien Bourdais (in 1996).

Kart Endurance Racing is the same, except karts are used.

== Motorboat endurance racing ==
=== Notable motorboat endurance races ===
The 24 Heures Motonautiques de Rouen took place on the Seine River from 1964 until 2019.

== Other forms ==
- In addition to the annual car and motorcycle race, the Circuit de la Sarthe also holds 24 hour races in cycling, karting, trucks, and road skating.
- A unique event involving an endurance race between lawn mowers takes place in the United Kingdom, called the "BLMRA 12 Hour Race".

== See also ==
- 24 hour mountain bike races
- Australian HPV Super Series
- Endurance World Championship
- Gran Turismo (racing)
- Greenpower
- Rally raid
- Sports car racing
- Pedal Car Racing
- 24 Hours of Lemons
- ChampCar Endurance Series

== Notes ==
^A Was known as the Daytona 3 Hour Continental, up to 1964.
^B Was known as the Daytona 2000, up until 1965 before becoming a 24 hour race following that year.
^C The race was shortened to 6 hours, partly over concerns that the 3 liter formula one engined prototypes were not reliable enough for the entire 24 hours.
