= Wayne Barlowe =

American SF and fantasy writer and artist

- Born: Wayne Douglas Barlowe; January 6, 1958 (age 68); Glen Cove, NY
- Known for: Science fiction and fantasy painting
- Notable work: Barlowe's Guide to Extraterrestrials; Expedition (book); work in filmography of Guillermo del Toro

Wayne Douglas Barlowe (born 1958) is an American science fiction and fantasy writer, painter, and concept artist. Barlowe's work focuses on esoteric landscapes and creatures such as citizens of hell and alien worlds. He has painted over 300 books, magazine covers and illustrations for many major book publishers, as well as Life magazine, Time magazine, and Newsweek. His 1979 book Barlowe's Guide to Extraterrestrials was nominated in 1980 for the Hugo Award for Best Related Non-Fiction Book, the first year that award category was awarded. It also won the 1980 Locus Award for Best Art or Illustrated Book. His 1991 speculative evolution book Expedition was nominated for the 1991 Chesley Award for Artistic Achievement.

Barlowe has worked as a concept artist for films such as Galaxy Quest (1999), Avatar (2009), and Aquaman (2018), among others. He is known to work closely with Guillermo Del Toro, serving as a creature designer for the Hellboy film series and the head creature designer for Pacific Rim (2013). His work on Hellboy (2004) resulted in his nomination for the 2005 Chesley Award for Product Illustration. Barlowe was the creator and executive producer of Alien Planet, a documentary adaptation of Expedition produced by Discovery Channel in 2005. He has written two fantasy novels: God's Demon (Tor Books, 2007) and its sequel The Heart of Hell (2019).
