= Alien Planet =

- 2009 DVD cover
- Genre: Speculative evolution Science fiction Nature documentary
- Based on: Expedition by Wayne Barlowe
- Written by: Peter Crabbe; Steve Eder
- Directed by: Pierre de Lespinois
- Narrated by: John C. McGinley
- Composer: Dean Grinsfelder
- Country of origin: United States
- Original language: English

Production
- Executive producers: Wayne Barlowe; Pierre de Lespinois; Tomi Landis; Frances LoCascio
- Producers: John Copeland; James R. Cowan
- Running time: 94 minutes
- Production companies: Image Entertainment; Meteor Studios

Original release
- Network: Discovery Channel
- Release: May 14, 2005

Alien Planet is a 2005 docufiction TV special created for the Discovery Channel. Based on the 1990 book Expedition by the artist and writer Wayne Barlowe, Alien Planet explores the imagined extraterrestrial life of the fictional planet Darwin IV in the style of a nature documentary. Although closely following Barlowe's depiction of Darwin IV, Alien Planet features a team of scientists and science fiction figures discussing Darwin IV as if it had actually been discovered. Among the people featured are Michio Kaku, Stephen Hawking, Jack Horner, James B. Garvin and George Lucas.

Alien Planet garnered positive reviews as a thought-provoking programme, though some criticism was raised concerning the strange creatures featured, which some reviewers saw as bordering on implausible.

== Plot ==
Alien Planet starts out with an unmanned interstellar spacecraft named Von Braun, leaving Earth's orbit. Traveling at 20% the speed of light (37,000 miles/s), it reaches Darwin IV, a planet 6.5 light-years away, in 42 years. Upon reaching orbit, it deploys the Darwin Reconnaissance Orbiter, which looks for potential landing sites for the probes. The first probe, Balboa, explodes along with its lifting body transport during entry, because one of its wings failed to unfold. Two backup probes, Leonardo da Vinci (nicknamed Leo) and Isaac Newton (nicknamed Ike), successfully land on the planet, and learn much about its bizarre indigenous lifeforms, including an apparently sapient species.

The robotic probes sent out to research on Darwin IV are called Horus Probes. Each Horus probe consists of an 8-foot-high (2.4 m), 40-foot-long (12 m) inflatable, hydrogen-filled balloon, which is covered with solar receptors, a computer 'brain', a 'head' covered with sensors, and several smaller robots that can be sent to places too dangerous for the probes themselves. The probes have a limited degree of artificial intelligence, very similar to the 'processing power' of a four-year-old. All the real thinking is done by a supercomputer in the orbiting Von Braun. The probes are programmed with different personalities; Ike is more cautious, while Leo is the risk-taker. The two probes are also equipped with a holographic message that will be projected to any sentient life found on Darwin.

After the two probes inflate their gas-bags, they encounter a voracious Arrowtongue and watch it pursue a Gyrosprinter. Later that night, the twins find the wreckage of Balboa and are ordered to split up, Ike studying the unique plant life and Leo going after big game. Ike's voyage takes him to one of Darwin IV's pocket forests, where he encounters a flock of Trunk Suckers and their predator, the Daggerwrist. Before his research is finished, a massive hurricane-like storm hits and Ike must take to the sky, launching weather balloons. Leo goes to the mountain ranges and finds a herd of Unths engaged in rutting-like behavior.

Afterward, Leo finds a pair of Bladderhorns engaging in combat, and tries to present the holographic message to one, but a sonic ping interrupts the conversation and scares off the animal before the probe is suddenly knocked out. Ike ventures to the meadows and gullies of Darwin IV, encountering massive Grovebacks, a herd of Littoralopes, the dangerous airborne predatory Skewers, a Groveback falling victim to a swarm of Beach Quills, and a pack of Prongheads hunting a Gyrosprinter.

Leo briefly re-establishes contact with Von Braun until a mysterious and evasive creature suddenly interferes, and Ike is ordered by the mothership to search for Leo. Ike's route takes him over perilous terrain, including the planet’s only sea, and find the entire aforementioned sea is Amoebic in nature (and attempts to attack him), making it a source of food to giant Sea Striders.

Ike manages to find Leo’s last known location, where a Skewer tries to attack him, but is killed by a spear. Investigating, Ike finds Leo and the mysterious, evasive and sapient species that has been trailing the two probes, the floating Eosapiens. Ike presents the holographic message to the Eosapien tribe and discovers they are truly intelligent, at a level estimated to be comparable to early humans. Ike launches a camera disk to record the moment, or perhaps "to assess the threat" due to a third Eosapien appearing; however one of the Eosapiens mistakes it as a deliberate attack, and destroys the camera disk while the others are prompted to directly attack Ike. Before shutting down, the wrecked camera disk records the Eosapien tribe carrying Ike away.

Commentary from notable people discussing the details behind the fictional world of Darwin IV and the likelihood of extraterrestrial life, in general, is interspersed throughout the special.

== Production ==
Alien Planet is based on Expedition (1990) by the American artist and writer Wayne Barlowe, a heavily illustrated book which aimed to explore and describe a fictional extraterrestrial ecosystem as if it was as real as that of Earth. Barlowe served as one of the executive producers of the adaptation. For the TV version, a broad team of scientists, and other figures, were assembled to comment on the life on Darwin IV, or to make general statements on life on Earth or out in the universe. Some of the people featured include physicists Michio Kaku and Stephen Hawking, paleontologist Jack Horner, NASA chief scientist James B. Garvin and director, screenwriter and producer George Lucas. Though the documentary gives the appearance of the featured scientists having designed Darwin IV and its animals, most of what is shown of the actual planet and its life follows what is described in Expedition.

Though much of Darwin IV and its creatures is identical to what was presented in the book, Alien Planet diverges from Expedition in several ways. Unlike Expedition, which is set in the mid-24th century, Alien Planet is set at an unspecified point in the near future, and unlike in the book, when the expedition was a crewed mission, the planet is explored using sophisticated probes. The technology featured is more advanced than present-day technology, but is based on current trends and informed speculation. Technologies such as autonomous probes and controlled 'miniprobes' are similar to technologies proposed by, or under development, by modern militaries and space agencies.

== Reception ==
Writing in The Space Review, the space historian Dwayne A. Day gave the special a positive review and concluded that "the writers and producers of Alien Planet have managed to successfully transcend current definitions of biology and yet still remained within the realm of the possible".

As also happened with the 1990 book, some criticism was leveled by reviewers at the strangeness of the creatures showcased in Alien Planet. In his review of the TV special, Dwayne A. Day stated that "the animals are bizarre and frequently border on the implausible" and that "they do not appear to have been developed with a single biological theory in mind". Day also noted, concerning the scientists who talk about the animals as if they were real, "clearly some of them think that the animals that they are supposed to report about are barely plausible". However, Day also stated that the Darwinian creatures are thought-provoking and that their strangeness is a good departure from the typical science fiction approach of making alien life look much like Earth life (such as using humanoid aliens). According to Day, the life of Darwin IV "makes the point that alien life, if it is detected, will challenge our abilities to understand and even comprehend it". A review in The Washington Post stated that "a few too many of the creatures seem like cartoonish monsters", though stated "but around almost every corner one encounters some sort of nutritious food for thought".

== See also ==
- Speculative evolution
- Natural History of an Alien
- Extraterrestrial – similar 2005 National Geographic Channel / Channel 4 documentary program also known as Alien Worlds
- The Future Is Wild – documentary series on possible future evolution of life on planet Earth
- Alien Worlds – Similar 2020 Netflix documentary program
- Astrobiology
- Hypothetical types of biochemistry – hypothesized life based on molecules other than carbon
- Xenology – a hypothetical scientific field that would study alien life, discussed mostly in science fiction
- Exoplanetology
