= Alien Worlds (2020 TV series) =

2020 British sci-fi nature docufiction

- Promotional poster
- Genre: Docufiction; Science fiction Speculative evolution
- Country of origin: United Kingdom
- Original language: English
- No. of seasons: 1
- No. of episodes: 4

Production
- Production company: Wall to Wall Media

Original release
- Network: Netflix
- Release: 2 December 2020

Alien Worlds is a British sci-fi nature docufiction narrated by Sophie Okonedo. The 4-part miniseries, depicted by using CGI techniques, blends fact with science fiction and conceptualizes what alien life might be like by applying the laws of life on Earth to imagined exoplanets. The series was released on Netflix on 2 December 2020.

== Episodes ==
| No. | Title | Original release date |
|---|---|---|
| 1 | "Atlas" | 2 December 2020 |
Atlas is a larger planet than Earth, with higher gravity and a thicker atmosphere leading to an airborne ecosystem. Astronomer Didier Queloz makes an appearance to discuss the discoveries of exoplanets and how they are analyzed in the real world. In explaining the aliens of Atlas, the episode also explores the handicap principle in insects, and shows a rehabilitative form of falconry as captive falcons are trained to live in the wild.
| 2 | "Janus" | 2 December 2020 |
Janus orbits a red dwarf star. Because it is close enough to the star to become tidally locked, Janus is separated into three main environments: the hemisphere facing the sun where it is always day, the opposite hemisphere which is always night, and a region of twilight on the boundary between them. Life has evolved to adapt to conditions on both hemispheres and to exploit the strong convective wind at the twilight zone for distributing larvae. The episode examines life in the Danakil Depression with exobiologist Kennda Lynch, polymorphism in leafcutter ants, scorpion venom, snottites, and bioluminescence in fireflies (including aggressive mimicry in Photuris), as inspiration for the five-legged "pentapods" on Janus.
| 3 | "Eden" | 2 December 2020 |
On the planet Eden, in a binary star system, the atmosphere is rich in oxygen, creating ideal conditions for life. A cactus-like parasitic fungus causes white rabbit/moth-like grazing creatures to lose their sense of fear. They are eaten by gremlin/tarsier-like predators, which the fungus kills as part of its life cycle. Ecologist Thomas Crowther talks about the role mycelial networks play in the Rothiemurchus Forest in Scotland. The episode also discusses the effect of predation on reproductive strategies, specifically among guppies in the Arima Valley in Trinidad; cooperation between humans (Hadza hunters in Tanzania) and honeyguide birds in finding and collecting honey; and the mayfly life cycle.
| 4 | "Terra" | 2 December 2020 |
Episode 4 imagines a planet called Terra, whose extremely advanced alien civilization is terraforming and colonizing another planet in its star system. The episode features Noor Power Station in its examination of how civilizations use energy, as well as RASSOR, a robot being developed by NASA. Astrophysicist Adam Frank talks about Area 51, explains why alien life has not yet been discovered, and discusses the possibility of extraterrestrial civilizations elsewhere in the Universe. Astronaut Michael Foale talks about a collision on the Mir space station and the hazard of space radiation to astronauts. Astrobiologist Doug Vakoch talks about the Arecibo message and the possibility of communication with extraterrestrial intelligence.

== Reception ==
The weekend after the series' release, it was one of Netflix's top 10 shows in the UK.

Sheena Scott of Forbes called the series "entertaining and very informative science fiction" and said that the most interesting part of the series was the non-fiction sections about planet Earth, which show "the breadth of knowledge scientists have accumulated about our planet". Likewise, Emma Stefansky of Thrillist said the alien creatures were fun, but "it's the Earth-bound science that ends up being the most interesting part".

== See also ==
- Alien Planet, a 2005 Discovery Channel TV film with a similar premise
- Natural History of an Alien, a 1998 TV film, also by the Discovery Channel
- Extraterrestrial (Alien Worlds in the UK) a 2005 National Geographic documentary series
