= Contact Conference =

Multi-disciplinary space science conference

Contact is an annual interdisciplinary conference that brings together social and space scientists, science fiction writers, and artists to exchange ideas, stimulate new perspectives, and encourage serious, creative speculation about humanity's future. The intent of Contact is to promote the integration of human factors into space research and policy, to explore the intersection of science and art, and to develop ethical approaches to cross-cultural contact. Since its beginnings, the Contact conference has fostered interdisciplinary inquiries into art, literature, exploration, and scientific investigation. A frequent subject is Cultures of The Imagination (COTI), where participants create an imaginary alien world and simulate encounters with human or other imagined civilizations.

Contact was conceived by anthropologist Jim Funaro in 1979, and the first formal conference was held in 1983 in Santa Cruz, California. Events continued annually until 2010, when they switched to a biennial schedule, with the exception of 2020. Several conferences were held at NASA's Ames Research Center. In June 1987, PBS aired a 30 minute special showing footage of the March 1987 conference, as well as a computer generated video of a probe sequence. In many conferences the COTI high school project involved teams of high school students in the creation of scientifically accurate extraterrestrial beings, and simulated encounters between two such races.

Many spin-off organizations have formed, online and as far away as Japan. One such organization is the Contact Consortium, which is focused on the medium of contact in multi-user virtual worlds on the Internet.

Contact has been closely allied with the SETI Institute and received the 2005 SETI League Best Ideas Award. Contact's early participants created the hypothetical planet Epona, which was included in the Discovery Channel documentary Natural History of an Alien.
