= Xpedition =

Xpedition may refer to:

- Xpedition (ship), a cruise ship for celebrity cruises and one of three vessels making up the Xpedition class
- Xpedition class
- Xpedition (CAD software), an EDA tool by Mentor Graphics

== See also ==
+ Expedition (disambiguation)
