= Kennda Lynch =

Astrobiologist and engineer for NASA programs

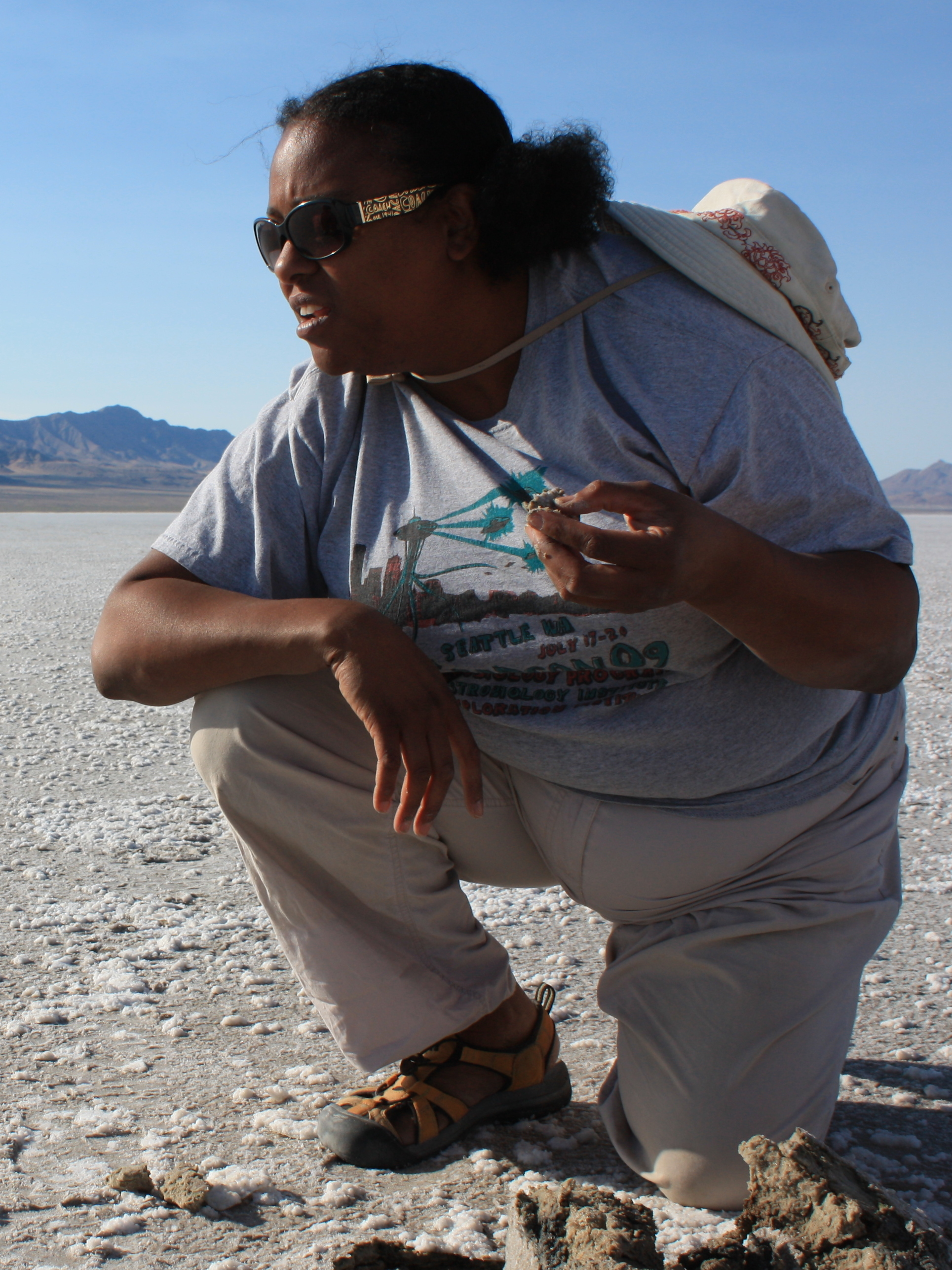
- Lynch at a Mars analog field site in Pilot Valley, Utah, U.S.
- Born: United States
- Occupations: Astrobiologist, scientist, engineer
- Scientific career
- Fields: Astrobiology, science, engineering
- Institutions: Universities Space. Research Association - Lunar and Planetary Institute, NASA Johnson Space Center, Georgia Institute of Technology/University of Montana, Jacobs Sverdrup/ Lockheed Martin Space Operations, International Space Station Program, Abbott Laboratories, The Boeing Company
- Academic advisors: Dr. David Klaus (grad), Dr. Junko Munakata Marr (grad), Dr. John Spear (grad)

Kennda Lian Lynch is an American astrobiologist and geomicrobiologist who studies polyextremophiles. She has primarily been affiliated with NASA. She identifies environments on Earth with characteristics that may be similar to environments on other planets, and creates models that help identify characteristics that would indicate an environment might host life. Lynch also identifies what biosignatures might look like on other planets. Much of Lynch's research on analog environments has taken place in the Pilot Valley Basin in the Great Salt Desert of northwestern Utah, U.S. Her work in that paleolake basin informed the landing location of NASA's Perseverance Rover mission—at another paleolake basin called Jezero Crater. Jim Green, Chief Scientist at NASA, called Lynch "a perfect expert to be involved in the Perseverance rover." Helping to select the proper landing site for NASA's first crewed mission to Mars in 2035 is another of Lynch's projects. Lynch has appeared in multiple television series, as well as The New York Times, Nature, Scientific American, and Popular Science. Cell Press designated Lynch one of the most inspiring Black scientists in the United States.

== Early life and education ==
Kennda Lynch is the daughter of Marlene Cosby and Kenneth Lynch. Both her parents worked at Hamilton Sundstrand Corporation, a defense contractor in Rockford, IL that worked on NASAs space shuttles. After seeing The Empire Strikes Back just before her sixth birthday kindled Lynch's passion for space, her parents brought home pictures of space shuttles from Sundstrand, which further fed her interest. Her mother was a Trekkie, so they also watched television shows from that franchise together. Lynch jokes that her mother takes less credit for her interest, however, quoting Cosby as saying: “You were an alien from the beginning.”

Lynch's mother was a Girl Scout and served as the chief executive officer of Drifting Dunes Girl Scout Council Inc, and was a zoology major who wanted to be a veterinarian. Her father also was a Boy Scout. Lynch was also Girl Scout, including being appointed as the student delegate to the National Girl Scout Program Conference. Lynch was raised spending a lot of time in nature.

Lynch attended Boylan Catholic High School, where she was on the student council. In 1991, Lynch was one of 40 Young Americans, a long-running program of the local newspaper, the Rockford Register, honoring extraordinary teenagers in the Rock River Valley. She graduated from Boylan in 1993.

Lynch attended the University of Illinois, planning to study general engineering. She completed a summer internship with Mark R. Patterson and another at Kennedy Space Center where she saw a space shuttle liftoff and also discovered the field of Astrobiology. Lynch and some friends also ran a theater company, "Actors in the Attic." In 1999, Lynch was team leader for a NASA competition that was part of NASA's Reduced Gravity Student Flight Opportunities Program at Ellington Field, near Lyndon B. Johnson Space Center. That competition won Lynch and her teammates an opportunity to carry out a fluid research experiment aboard the KC-135, an airplane that escapes Earth's gravity. In 1999, Lynch graduated with a dual major in engineering and biology.

Lynch earned a master's in aerospace engineering sciences at the University of Colorado at Boulder. She then received the NASA Harriet Jenkins Predoctoral Fellowship to complete her Ph.D. in environmental science and engineering at Colorado School of Mines. During her doctoral program, she began her research in Utah. She completed her Ph.D. in 2015 and moved to Georgia Institute of Technology as a postdoctoral fellow, where she continued her study of Mars analog environments.

== Career ==
Lynch first worked as a Metrology Engineer, Corporate Engineering Division at Abbot Laboratories. She then worked for Lockheed Martin for several years, followed by additional year at Jacobs Sverdrup. These two jobs were located in Houston, TX, at NASA Johnson Space Center. At first Lynch worked as a project engineer on human space flight in the Crew and Thermal Systems division, where she developed habitation hardware for International Space Station astronauts. Lynch met Kathy Thomas-Keprta, a specialist on the Allan Hills 84001 meteorite and through Thomas-Kerpta, chief astrobiological scientist David S. McKay, for whom she went to work as a systems engineer. Lynch contributed to the prototyping of robots for missions to Mars.

While at graduate school, Lynch was a graduate research assistant, first at BioServe Space Technologies and then at the Laboratory For Atmospheric and Space Physics. Her work was affiliated with NASA through NASA's Harriett Jenkins Pre-Doctoral Fellowship which funded her role as a predoctoral research fellow at the Colorado School of Mines.

=== Postdoctoral work ===
In 2016, Lynch was a Postdoctoral Research Fellow in the Rosenzweig Group at the University of Montana, in Missoula, MT, before moving to Georgia Tech, where she was a postdoctoral fellow from 2016 to 2019. Lynch started at Georgia Tech in the School of Earth and Atmospheric Sciences, working with James Wray, then worked with Frank Rosenzweig in the School of Biological Sciences. When Lynch received a grant from the Ford Foundation she shifted her primary base of operations to the lab of EAS Assistant Jennifer Glass. During this period, astrobiology research took off at Georgia Tech, and Lynch was part of the Georgia Tech NASA Astrobiology Institute team.

Since 2019, Lynch has been a staff scientist for Universities Space Research Association (USRA), located at Georgia Tech.

=== Teaching, outreach, and mentoring ===
Lynch teaches and mentors students and also works to expand diversity in STEM education. In her early years of working for at Johnson Space Center, she mentored high school and undergraduate students. In graduate school, she was a lab instructor, a teaching assistant, and a Teaching Fellow for Bechtel's K-5 Educational Initiative. Since 2013 she has been working with the SAGANet Virtual Mentoring Program. She served a two-year term as a NASA Students Ambassador from 2010 to 2012. Additionally, Lynch does a lot of explaining of space science to the public, both directly and through the media.

== Research ==
Lynch summarizes her biosignature research as "All life poops." In other words, all life uses energy and excretes waste products. Some of those waste products might be preserved and appear as biosignatures, telling us that life exists—or formerly existed. Lynch identifies biosignatures in environments on Earth that might be analogous to ones on other planets, teaching us what signals we might use to recognize extraterrestrial life.

Much of Lynch's biosignature research has focused on perchlorates, a kind of salt, in the Pilot Valley part of Great Salt Lake Desert, Utah, USA. Pilot Valley is a hypersaline paleolake basin, an ancient lake that used to be quite deep but has now receded. It used to be a freshwater lake, but as climate change caused evaporation, it has become increasingly salinated. A lot of lake sediments remain, teeming with a diversity of microbes. Lynch looks for microbial DNA and strives to understand what the microbial communities look like with regard to diversity, aspects of life such as what they eat or how they obtain energy, and even how various microbes interact with each other. Lynch discovered the first known place on earth where there are both perchlorates and perchlorates-reducing (essentially perchlorates-consuming) microbes.

Lynch selected Pilot Valley as the site to carry out research for her doctoral dissertation, "A Geobiological Investigation of the Hypersaline Sediments of Pilot Valley, Utah: A Terrestrial Analog to Ancient Lake Basins on Mars." Ultimately, Jezero Crater was selected as the landing site for the 2020 Mars mission, Perseverance, because it is also a paleolake. It is expected to contain percholates, and would be an ideal candidate for a location containing percholates-reducing bacteria, should there be signs of life on Mars. Because Jezero Crater has signs of a former delta, meaning water was flowing in from an upstream location, Lynch argues that sediments from three environments potentially converge there—from streams that flowed into the ancient lake; the actual Jezero lake; and groundwater that has surfaced following evaporation of the lake and the streams that feed it.

Lynch won NASA's 2020 Selections for the Astrobiology Program Early Career Collaboration Award. She will collaborate with University of Florida's Amy Williams on sample analysis and Georgetown University's Sarah Stewart on creating a tool for “Working Towards Life Detection Capability in Subsurface Transitional Habitable Zones on Mars.”

== Selected publications ==
Lynch has over fifty publications and conference publications as of early 2021. She also serves as a manuscript reviewer for JGR Planets, Geobiology, Astrobiology, Planetary and Space Science, as well as a peer reviewer for grants with the NASA Exobiology Program Peer Review Panel and the NASA Earth and Space Science Fellowship (NESSF). Lynch also serves on the organizing committee of many conferences in her field and is a frequent presenter at conferences.

=== Astrobiology ===
- Hays, Lindsay E.; Graham, Heather V.; Des Marais, David J.; Hausrath, Elisabeth M.; Horgan, Briony; McCollom, Thomas M.; Parenteau, M. Niki; Potter-McIntyre, Sally L.; Williams, Amy J.; Lynch, Kennda L. (2017-02-08). "Biosignature Preservation and Detection in Mars Analog Environments". Astrobiology. 17 (4): 363–400. doi:10.1089/ast.2016.1627.
- Abrevaya, Ximena C.; Anderson, Rika; Arney, Giada; Atri, Dimitra; Azúa-Bustos, Armando; Bowman, Jeff S.; Brazelton, William J.; Brennecka, Gregory A.; Carns, Regina; Chopra, Aditya; Colangelo-Lillis, Jesse (2016-08-01). Domagal-Goldman, Shawn D.; Wright, Katherine E.; Domagal-Goldman, Shawn D.; Wright, Katherine E.; Adamala, Katarzyna; Arina de la Rubia, Leigh; Bond, Jade; Dartnell, Lewis R.; Goldman, Aaron D. (eds.). "The Astrobiology Primer v2.0". Astrobiology. 16 (8): 561–653. doi:10.1089/ast.2015.1460.
- Stoker, Carol; Dunagan, Stephen; Stevens, Todd; Amils, Ricardo; Gomez-Elvira, Javier; Fernandez, David; Hall, James; Lynch, Kennda; Cannon, Howard;Zavaleta, Jhony. (2004-01-01). "Mars Analog Rio Tinto Experiment (MARTE): 2003 Drilling Campaign to Search for a Subsurface Biosphere at Rio Tinto Spain". Lunar and Planetary Science XXXV: Astrobiology: Analogs and Applications to the Search for Life.
- Lynch, Kennda L.; Horgan, Briony H.; Munakata‐Marr, Junko; Hanley, Jennifer; Schneider, Robin J.; Rey, Kevin A.; Spear, John R.; Jackson, W. Andrew; Ritter, Scott M. (2015). "Near-infrared spectroscopy of lacustrine sediments in the Great Salt Lake Desert: An analog study for Martian paleolake basins". Journal of Geophysical Research: Planets. 120 (3): 599–623. doi:10.1002/2014JE004707

=== Education, outreach, and equity ===
- K. LYNCH, P. LEIBER, M. PEDERSEN, M. TULI, T. LONGAZO, L. MILLER, S. PALMER, M. ZHANG. (2002). SETI and Astrobiology: Contact-A Youth Perspective. IAF abstracts, 34th COSPAR Scientific Assembly, 366.
- Rathbun, J., E. Rivera-Valentin, J. Keane, C. Richey, K. Lynch, S. Diniega, L. Quick, and J. Vertesi. (2020). "Who is Missing in Planetary Science?: Recommendations to increase the number of Black and Latinx scientists." In AAS/Division for Planetary Sciences Meeting Abstracts, vol. 52, no. 6, pp. 502–15.
- Rivera-Valentín, E. G., Rathbun, J., Keane, J. T., Lynch, K., Richey, C., Diniega, S., & Vertesi, J. (2020). Who is missing in planetary science?: A demographic study of the planetary science workforce. White paper.
- Diniega, S., Brooks, S., Gilmore, M., Lynch, K., Núñez, J., Quick, L., ... & Rathbun, J. (2020, October). Recognizing our colleagues of color in Planetary Science. In AAS/Division for Planetary Sciences Meeting Abstracts (Vol. 52, No. 6, pp. 502–06).
- Lynch, K. L., Diniega, S., Quick, L. C., Horst, S. M., Rivera-Valentin, E. G., & Rathbun, J. A. (2019, March). 50 Years of Planetary Science Workforce: Hidden Figures and the Legacy of Apollo. In Lunar and Planetary Science Conference (No. 2132, p. 3162).
- Diniega S., Castillo-Rogez J., Daubar I., Filiberto J., Goudge T., Lynch K., Rutledge A., Rathbun J., Scully J., Smith R., Richey C., Udovicic C.T., and Villarreal M. (2020) Ensuring a safe and equitable workspace: The importance and feasibility of a Code of Conduct, along with clear policies regarding authorship and team membership. White Paper . LPI Contribution Number: LPI-002544.
- K. Lynch “WALLE: Saving the Earth, Forecasting the Future” (Feature Story). NSBE Bridge Magazine. Summer 2008 Issue.
- K. Lynch “Learning Life on Mars”. Magazine of the National Society of Black Engineers (NSBE). March/April, 2007. Vol. 18. #4:57-59.

== Other media ==
Lynch is a featured expert in three television episodes about life on other planets:

- Explained: Extraterrestrial Life (2018)
- Glad You Asked: Will We Survive Mars? (2019)
- Alien Worlds: Janus (2020)
