= Expeditions (poetry collection) =

Expeditions is a collection of poetry by Margaret Atwood, published in 1966.
