= James B. Garvin =

NASA scientist

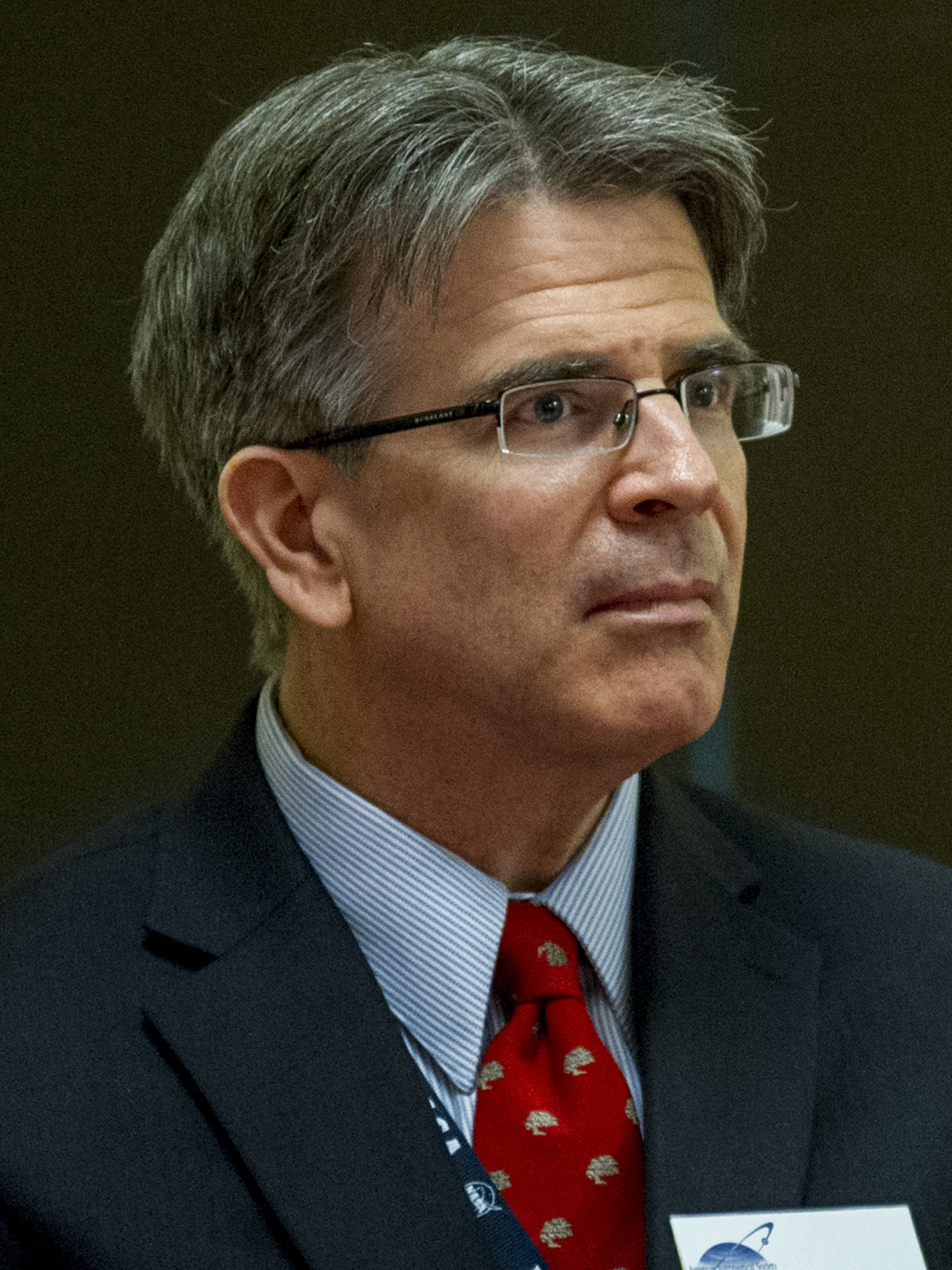
- Jim Garvin in 2013
- Born: Poughkeepsie, New York
- Education: Brown University (B.Sc., M.Sc., Ph.D.); Stanford University (M.Sc.)
- Occupation: scientist
- Years active: 1984 - present
- Employer: NASA
- Known for: Mars exploration

James B. Garvin served as NASA's Chief Scientist from October 2004 to September 2005 and is known for his foundational work in NASA's Mars explorational programs.

Garvin arrived at the Goddard Space Flight Center in 1984. He first served as a staff scientist developing remote sensing instrumentation and has been based there or at the nearby NASA headquarters in Washington D.C. since then. His career has spanned disciplines as Earth system science, Mars Exploration, lunar exploration, Venus, asteroids, and the outer planets. He has been a co-investigator on NASA's Mars Observer, Mars Global Surveyor, NEAR-Shoemaker, OSIRIS-REx, Mars Curiosity Rover, Canada's Radarsat, and ESA's Envisat missions.

Garvin is the principal investigator of the DAVINCI+ mission (Deep Atmosphere Venus Investigation of Noble gases, Chemistry, and Imaging). In 2021 it was selected as one of NASA's next Discovery Program missions, for launch between 2028 and 2030.

== Early life and education ==
Garvin was born in Poughkeepsie, New York. From an early age he demonstrated an interest in geology and space. Garvin attended Brown University graduating magna cum laude with a Bachelor of Science degree in Computer Science in 1978. He earned his Masters of Science also in Computer Science from Stanford University 1979. Garvin subsequently returned to Brown where he earned his Masters of Science and PhD in planetary geological sciences 1984.

He lives with his wife and two children in Columbia, Maryland.

== Awards and recognition ==
Garvin was twice awarded NASA Outstanding Leadership medals for his work on the science strategy behind NASA's Mars Exploration Program. He was also awarded the 2004 William Rogers Award from Brown University for his contributions to society.
