= Expedition Trophy =

Winter motorsport rally in Russia

The Murmansk–Vladivostok Expedition Trophy is recognized as the world's longest winter motor rally, covering a distance of 12,500 km. The rally begins at the Kola Bay lighthouse in Murmansk, located in north-west Russia and ends at the Zolotoi Rog Bay lighthouse in Vladivostok, in far eastern Russia. It holds the distinction of being the longest rally to take place entirely within one country. The rally was first held in 2005 to celebrate the completion of the Trans-Siberian Highway in 2004.

The rally consists of two-vehicle teams, with each vehicle accommodating three people, and at least one person on each team must be female. The race follows the route Murmansk–St. Petersburg–Moscow - Yekaterinburg–Novosibirsk–Krasnoyarsk–Irkutsk–Khabarovsk–Vladivostok, with teams being eliminated at the end of each stage, leading to a total duration of 13 days for the entire journey.
