= Natural History of an Alien =

- Starring: Various scientists
- Country of origin: United Kingdom
- No. of episodes: 1

Production
- Running time: 1 hour with commercials (US)

Original release
- Network: BBC Two
- Release: 1998

Natural History of an Alien, also known as Anatomy of an Alien in the US, is an early Discovery Channel pseudo-documentary similar to Alien Planet, aired in 1998. This pseudo-documentary featured various alien ecosystem projects, from the Epona Project to Ringworld. It also featured many notable scientists and science fiction authors such as Dr. Jack Cohen, Derek Briggs, Christopher McKay, David Wynn-Williams, Emily Holton, Peter Cattermole, Brian Aldiss, Sil Read, Wolf Read, Edward K. Smallwood, Adega Zuidema, Steve Hanly, Kevin Warwick and Dougal Dixon.

== Plot ==
The viewer is in an intergalactic spaceship named the S.S. Attenborough, run by a small green alien. They visit a series of locations and discuss them as if in a documentary. It starts with Earth during the Cambrian, and Mars. They then visit asteroids and talk about the possibility of panspermia seeding solar system with life. They continue their journey to Europa, but with a number of speculative organisms. From there the journey takes them to a series of fictional planets full of alien organisms.

=== Europa ===
==== Featured organisms ====
- Europa Cone Bacteria: Orange-gray bacteria that grow in towers that rise many miles above the ocean floor. Inside these vents warm water rises, providing for layer upon layer of bacteria.
- Europa Sea Vent Herbivore: A giant, gray, shark-like animal that feeds on bacteria in schools with a suction cup-like mouth on an extended, Opabinia-like trunk. These trunk-shaped mouths pierce the vents to suck in vast quantities of bacteria. These grazers are territorial and, like squid on Earth, flash warning glows to drive away rivals. They make a series of dolphin-like cries.
- Europa Sea Vent Carnivore: A predatory, yellow-green, echolocating, streamlined, shark-like animal that fast and preys on the Europa Sea Vent Herbivores. Like the Europa Sea Vent Herbivores, the Europa Sea Vent Carnivores have an Opabinia-like snout, which they use to kill their prey.

=== High Gravity Planet ===
High Gravity Planet is home to many insect-like aliens, who have adapted to 1.5 times Earth's gravity. The high gravity creates a thicker atmosphere (the planet in question having an atmosphere 15 times as dense as Earth's), so flight is easier.

==== Featured organisms ====
- Pteropede: A gray-green, millipede-like creature with accordion-folding, dragon-like wings. It resembles a dragonfly when it flies. To support its great weight, the creature's eight legs are directly under its body. It breathes through lungs in the tip of its tail, which is more efficient than the way insects take in air, so the Pteropede is able to pump oxygen through its large, heavy body. To grow, the Pteropede must enter the water. It is only in the buoyancy of water, where gravity is counteracted, that the Pteropede can shed its skin and increase in size. Once the new skin is hardened, the Pteropede can return to the demanding heavy gravity environment on land.
- Sputnik Bug: A small, blue, Eoarthropleura-like creature named after Sputnik 1, the first artificial satellite in orbit. It has spines to protect it from a dangerous fall. Whenever it does fall, it immediately rolls up in a ball when it starts to tumble.
- Splatter Bug: A small, brown, eurypterid-like creature. It has nothing to protect its soft body. It's described as an evolutionary dead-end.

=== Helliconia ===
Helliconia is a fictional world created by Brian Aldiss. It's in a binary system, which shows how life can adapt to having two suns.

==== Featured organism ====
- Helliconian Tree: a strange-looking tree with a cooling tower-shaped trunk and branches on the very top that sprout narrow leaves, making the branch look like moth antenna during the planet's short summers. Like deciduous trees on Earth, the Helliconian Tree turns dormant during snow-filled winters. It sheds its leaves, but also its branches curl up and go inside the tree. The tree then shields its top by growing an ice-like cap.

=== Sulfuria ===
Sulfuria is a fictional world created by Dougal Dixon. It's a sulfur rich world that is similar to Io.

==== Featured organisms ====
- Sulfurian Balloon Plant: A tall, orange organism that lives off of sunlight. They are like giant balloons, anchored to the ground and buoyed up by the gas inside of their flattish, pizza-like tops. They are like kelp. Babies sprout from the sides of the parent plant and eventually break off, becoming independent adults.
- Parachute Worm: A whitish-gray, earthworm-like creature that lives off the gas of the Sulfurian Balloon Plant by sucking it out. Newly born larvae resemble twigs with two umbrella-like extensions. Larvae are born live as the mother is feeding. Later the young depart from their mothers and use the umbrella-like extensions to parachute down gently through the murk of the atmosphere to the planet floor, after which the umbrellas are shed. After falling into water and shedding, the young Parachute Worms feed on the nutritious roots of the Sulfurian Balloon Plants. When they have fattened from the feeding, the adults make their epic journey back up the stalks to mate. The Parachute Worm is a perpetual migrant. Its lifecycle is a response to the extreme environment.

=== Epona ===
Epona is an imaginary ecosystem created by group of scientists and science fiction writers called The Epona Project, begun by Martyn J. Fogg at a Contact conference in 1992.

==== Featured organisms ====
- Epona Pagoda Tree: A thin-trunked, green, sessile photosynthetic animal that appears like a tree surrounded by large, disk-shaped "leaves" which are evolved limbs. The "leaves" grow very large to get as much carbon dioxide as possible. While sessile, the trees are capable of a remarkable range of movement, a trait inherited from their mobile ancestors. If a "herbivore" comes to nibble on them, they are able to fold back their branches.
- Spring Croc: A green, hopping, one-legged, predatory, Venus flytrap-like creature, and the major predator on Epona. It lies in wait for its prey, usually while partially submerged.
- Uther: A brownish-gray flying creature resembling a cross between a Sharovipteryx and a pterosaur. They are descended from flying fish-like ancestors. They began their avian-like lifestyle hunting Salacopods (small, amphibian-like creatures), and later adapted to feeding on larger carcasses. They then became predators themselves. In order to fly, they use a combination of hydrogen peroxide and ethanol to hyper-oxygenate their blood, which allows them incredible stamina.

=== Greenworld ===
Greenworld is a fictional world created by Dougal Dixon. It is an Earth-like planet filled with lush rainforests.

==== Featured organisms ====
- Curlywhorl: An arboreal, purple-red, centipede/iguana-like creature evolved from aquatic, sea star-like ancestors, like all the other inhabitants of Greenworld.
- Pud: A small, green, three-eyed, weevil-like creature from Greenworld's equator. There are thousands of species across the planet. They are like the beetles of Earth. The featured species has six limbs, five of which are used for grasping and one for movement. This gives the Pud a hopping gait. They are often seen in groups, foraging for fallen fruit in the undergrowth. They have many predators and can sense danger coming with their three sensitive, leaf-like antennae. Puds make a series of chirps and hoots.
- Kwank: A large, reddish-brown, robber crab-like creature with a turtle-like shell on its back. It feeds on Puds.
- Unidentified large, lobster-like predator: An inhabitant of Greenworld that sometimes attacks and eats Kwanks. It's only shown in the form of its shadow.

==== Artificial Life ====
On Greenworld, the ship encounters an artificial lifeforms from a robotic cube ship. It uses solar panels to gather energy and mines asteroids to get resources to grow. It even sends down a probe resembling a metallic centipede to Greenworld to explore it. At the end of the film, the narrator is revealed to be a little green man-like female alien.
