= Expedition (book) =

1990 science fiction book by Wayne Barlowe

- First edition cover
- Author: Wayne Barlowe
- Illustrator: Wayne Barlowe
- Cover artist: Wayne Barlowe
- Language: English
- Genre: Speculative evolution Science fiction
- Published: 1990
- Publisher: Workman Publishing Company
- Publication place: United States
- Media type: Print
- Pages: 192
- ISBN: 978-0894809828

Expedition: Being an Account in Words and Artwork of the 2358 A.D. Voyage to Darwin IV is a 1990 speculative evolution and science fiction book written and illustrated by the American artist and writer Wayne Barlowe. Written as a first-person account of a 24th-century crewed expedition to the fictional exoplanet of Darwin IV, Expedition describes and discusses an imaginary extraterrestrial ecosystem as if it were real.

The extraterrestrial or alien organisms of Darwin IV were designed to be "truly alien", with Barlowe having grown dissatisfied with the common science fiction trope of alien life being similar to life on Earth, especially the notion of intelligent alien humanoids. None of Darwin IV's wildlife have eyes, external ears, hair, or jaws, and they bear little resemblance to terrestrial organisms. Various sources of inspiration were used for the creature designs, including dinosaurs, modern beasts and different types of vehicles.

Expedition garnered very favorable reviews, being praised particularly for its many illustrations and for the level of detail in the text, which serves to maintain the illusion of realism. Several reviewers also criticized the life forms, finding some of them to be implausible or doubting that Darwin IV could actually function as an ecosystem. In 2005, Expedition was adapted into a TV special for the Discovery Channel titled Alien Planet. Barlowe served as the design consultant and one of the executive producers of the adaptation.

== Premise ==
Expedition is written as though it is published in the year 2366, five years after Barlowe partook in a crewed expedition to the planet Darwin IV. In the 24th century, the exploitation of the Earth's ecosystem has created an environment so toxic that mass extinctions have wiped out nearly most of its nonhuman animal population. Most of the remaining fauna, with the exception of humans themselves, have suffered horrible mutations and can only be found in zoos. Aided by a benevolent and technologically superior alien race, the Yma, humanity begins to repair their ravaged world while simultaneously learning more about the universe around them. When an uncrewed Yma probe discovers evidence of alien life on Darwin IV, the titular "expedition" is sent to investigate.

Barlowe presents his findings in a collection of paintings, sketches, field notes, and diary entries from his explorations of Darwin IV. He details a variety of alien lifeforms such as "Gyrosprinters", "Arrowtongues", "Grovebacks", "Daggerwrists", "Skewers", "Emperor Sea Striders", and "Eosapiens". Unlike the creatures presented in much of popular science fiction, which often seem to be variations of terrestrial lifeforms, Barlowe's animals are truly alien; none of them possess eyes or true jaws, their body structures are often unlike any found on Earth, and they have unique modes of locomotion, sensing, and eating. Very late in the expedition, the explorer encounters lifeforms which use tools (the Eosapiens), giving a very strong indication they are intelligent.

A conservationist theme is present throughout the book. The expedition is designed to have as minimal an impact as possible on Darwin IV's environment. When two of the expedition's members suffer a fatal accident, Yma technology is used to remove all traces of the accident from Darwin IV's environment. At the conclusion of the expedition, Darwin IV is left in the same pristine state it was in prior to the expedition, with the exception of a metal obelisk placed in a remote area by the Yma.

== Development ==
According to Barlowe, the book was partly inspired by the books on prehistoric life published by paleontologist Josef Augusta and paleoartist Zdeněk Burian. Barlowe is the son of two natural history illustrators, and viewed Expedition as a way to continue in their tradition, but also doing it in his way. The first painting completed for the book was that of the 'Rayback' a 'liquivorous' predator. At the time, the painting was just an "alien wildlife painting", with Barlowe not yet having decided to write an entire book. It was only with the second painting, which depicted the 'Daggerwrist', that the idea of the project took form. With the 'Daggerwrist' painting, Barlowe decided on the ground rule that none of the creatures were to have eyes, hair or external ears.

Barlowe used various sources of inspiration to come up with the creatures of Darwin IV. The 'Arrowtongue', a large predator, was inspired by the dinosaur Tyrannosaurus rex. In some cases, features of several different Earth animals were combined to create something otherworldly: the 'Sac-back' took inspiration from hornbills, camels and cuttlefish. In other cases, the inspirations were not even biological: the flying predatory 'Skewers' were inspired by airplanes and the 'Emperor Sea Strider' was inspired by ships at sea. The 'Eosapiens', the most intelligent and sophisticated of Darwin IV's creatures (roughly on the level of australopithecines) were deliberately designed to be as non-human as possible, due to Barlowe disliking the trope of intelligent aliens in science fiction being humanoids. Expedition took nearly five years to write and illustrate.

== Reception ==
A review in Publishers Weekly stated that the book had an "abundance of lavish full-color illustrations and detailed black-and-white sketches" and that the many details mentioned in the book, such as information on the planet of Darwin IV itself, and the intricate details on the behavior of the various creatures, "help maintain the illusion of realism and immediacy such a first person narrative demands". In his 2005 review in The Space Review of Alien Planet, a 2005 TV special based on Expedition, space historian Dwayne A. Day described Expedition as "highly regarded".

The book was nominated for the 1991 Chesley Award for Artistic Achievement. Also in 1991, Expedition was named the 'Best Book for Teenagers' by the New York Public Library. A portion of the book, "Sea Strider Skull and Littoralope" was reprinted by the American Littoral Society in 1996.

A review in The Vindicator described Expedition as a "lavish science-fiction bestiary", but stated that the "weird creatures lack the necessary aura of plausibility". This review was not the only one that found some of the creatures implausible. In his 2005 review of Alien Planet, which featured the same lifeforms, Dwayne A. Day stated that "the animals are bizarre and frequently border on the implausible" and that "they do not appear to have been developed with a single biological theory in mind". Day however also noted that they are thought-provoking and that their strangeness is a good departure from the typical science fiction approach of making alien life look much like Earth life (such as using humanoid aliens). According to Day, the life of Darwin IV "makes the point that alien life, if it is detected, will challenge our abilities to understand and even comprehend it". A review of Alien Planet in the Washington Post noted that "a few too many of the creatures seem like cartoonish monsters". The Publishers Weekly review also pointed out the bizarre nature of some of the creatures, stating that "while superbly executed, Barlowe's visualization of an alien world falls short imaginatively and is naturalistically unconvincing. Many animals look like dinosaurs designed by a committee and discerning readers will suspect that Darwin IV wouldn't work as an ecological system, no matter how alien".

== Possible sequel ==
Barlowe has hinted that he at some point intends to return to do something similar to Expedition again. In the 1995 artbook The Alien Life of Wayne Barlowe, he wrote, concerning a painting of a marine alien lifeform, that "in the future, I may further explore the oceans of some distant world". In The Alien Life of Wayne Barlowe, Barlowe also included a section on a joint speculative evolution/science fiction project between Barlowe and visual effects supervisor Phil Tippett, concerning another fictional planet with life, called 'Belon 3'. Though nothing has yet materialized, both the marine alien painting and a painting of Belon 3 are included on the Expedition section of Barlowe's website under the heading "Expedition II . . . . . . ?".

== Adaptation ==
In 2005, Expedition was adapted into the television special Alien Planet, which first aired on the Discovery Channel on 14 May 2005. Barlowe served as the executive producer and design consultant of the adaptation. The lifeforms in Alien Planet are for the most part faithful to their depictions in the book; however, the expedition is conducted by sophisticated robotic flying machines instead of humans.
