= Sara Imari Walker =

American theoretical physicist and astrobiologist

Sara Walker
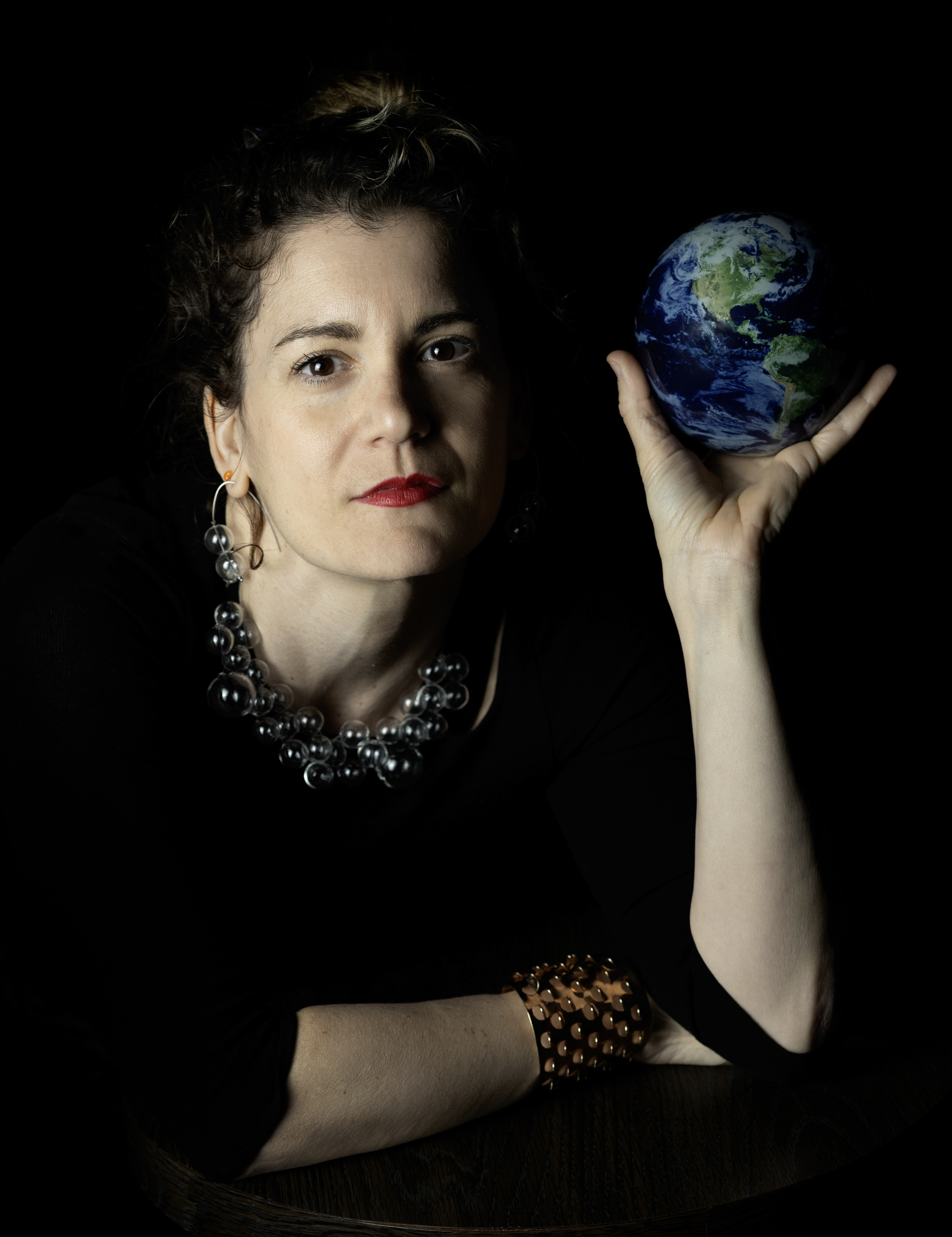
- Sara Imari Walker in 2025
- Education: Dartmouth College; Florida Institute of Technology; Cape Cod Community College
- Scientific career
- Fields: Physics of life, astrobiology, abiogenesis
- Workplaces: Georgia Institute of Technology; NASA Astrobiology Institute; Santa Fe Institute; Arizona State University
- Thesis: Theoretical Models for the Emergence of Biomolecular Homochirality
- Doctoral advisor: Marcelo Gleiser
- Other academic advisors: Paul Davies
- Website: http://emergence.asu.edu/

Sara Imari Walker is an American theoretical physicist and astrobiologist with research interests in the origins of life, astrobiology, physics of life, emergence, complex and dynamical systems, and artificial life. Walker is deputy director of the Beyond Center for Fundamental Concepts in Science at Arizona State University (ASU), associate director of the ASU-SFI Center for Biosocial Complex Systems and an associate professor at ASU. She is a co-founder of the astrobiology social network SAGANet, and on the board of directors for Blue Marble Space, a nonprofit education and science organization. As a science communicator, she is a frequent guest on podcasts and series, such as Through the Wormhole with Morgan Freeman.

== Education and background ==
Walker was born and raised in Connecticut. She attended Cape Cod Community College and studied at the Florida Institute of Technology, where she graduated cum laude earning a B.S. in physics in 2005. She earned her Ph.D. in physics and astronomy in 2010 from Dartmouth College. Her thesis was Theoretical Models for the Emergence of Biomolecular Homochirality and her doctoral advisor was Marcelo Gleiser.

== Career ==
After graduating from Dartmouth, Walker began a postdoctoral fellowship at the Georgia Institute of Technology working at the NSF/NASA Center for Chemical Evolution. In 2011 she accepted a NASA Postdoctoral Program Fellowship with the NASA Astrobiology Institute and began working at Arizona State University (ASU). In 2013, Walker became an assistant professor at the School of Earth and Space Exploration as well as the Beyond Center for Fundamental Concepts in Science at ASU. She became a faculty member for the Center for Social Dynamics and Complexity, as well as a graduate faculty member for the Department of Physics and Complex Systems Initiative at ASU in 2014. In 2015, Walker began a fellowship at the ASU-SFI Center for Biosocial Complex Systems as part of a joint educational and research program between Santa Fe Institute and Arizona State University.

== Research ==
Walker is a theoretical physicist and astrobiologist with research interests in the origin of life. She seeks to develop new theories of physics to explain what life is, how it emerged, and what signs of life might look like on other planets. She is currently working on developing new technology to detect possible signs of life with NASA as a Principle Investigator for their Interdisciplinary Consortia for Astrobiology Research (iCAR). She uses mathematical models to investigate chemical evolution and the development of networks on Prebiotic Earth. She looks at information flow in biotic and abiotic systems to further define life and its emergence. Some of the highlights of her work in this field so far are:

=== The origin of homochirality ===
Walker has studied the possible mechanisms of the origin of homochirality, which is a key problem in the origin of life. In her research she has used several models such as the Sandars polymerization model, the Langevin equation, and the activation-polymerization-epimerization-depolymerization (APED) model to imitate potential prebiotic conditions for autocatalytic polymerization networks. Walker et al. discovered that only networks with long polymers show potential to produce significant spontaneous asymmetrical chirality in speculative early Earth conditions. Walker and her colleagues, have also shown that the violent environment of prebiotic Earth would have continuously changed the chirality of reaction networks by a mechanism they termed punctuated chirality. This suggests that the origin of homochirality was not a singular event, and that chiral selection occurred at the same time as the origin of life. Walker and Gleiser also revealed that homochiral proto-domains can form in the middle of racemic networks, and that the slowdown of these networks through processes such as tidal motion or evaporating pools could have led to the stabilization of these structures on early Earth. The results of these simulations have helped to reveal what possibly occurred during the origin of homochiralty, and its effect on the origin of life.

=== Information flow in biological systems ===
One of the major challenges in studying the origin of life has been the inability to clearly define what life is. In her investigations, Walker has used the flow of information in systems as a means to distinguish life from non-life. She used the Boolean network model, information theory, and other models to discern feasible universal traits for life. It was shown that in biological systems the components are subordinate to the whole, in what is called top-down causation. Furthermore, a logistical model of Walker et al. suggested that major evolutionary transitions, such as the origin of life, could be characterized by a reverse of information flow in a system from bottom-up to top-down. They also determined that living systems have a separation of data from machinery, and non-trivial replication. Walker has shown theoretically how the occurrence of these biotic traits in an abiotic system present a possible framework for the origin of life.

== Public engagement ==
Walker is an advocate for the communication of science to the public, and has participated in many interviews, panels, and lectures to discuss her research and topics related to her fields of study. She has had press coverage in dozens of news sources, and been active on multiple media platforms. She appeared on the Discover Channel's Through the Wormhole with Morgan Freeman in the episode "Are We Here for a Reason?". She has made two appearances on National Public Radio's Science Friday. She is a co-founder of the astrobiology social network SAGANet, and was a guest scientist on the educational website I'm a Scientist: Get Me Out of Here!.

Her book Life as No One Knows It: The Physics of Life's Emergence came out in 2024.

== Organizations ==
Walker is a member of multiple scientific organizations, including the Blue Marble Space Institute of Science, the NASA Astrobiology Institute, the Foundational Questions Institute (FQXI), and the International Society for Artificial Life, serving on its board of directors. She is also a member of the Complex Systems Society and is on the board of directors for Blue Marble Space. She is a member of the Lifeboat Foundation and serves on its Astrobiology/SETI Advisory Board.

== Selected publications ==
- S.I. Walker and P.C.W. Davies "The Algorithmic Origins of Life" (2013) J. Roy. Soc. Interface 6: 20120869.
- M. Gleiser and S.I. Walker (2008) An Extended Model for the Evolution of Prebiotic Homochirality: A Bottom-Up Approach to the Origins of Life. Orig. Life Evol. Biosph. 38: 293 – 315.
- S.I. Walker, M.A. Grover and N. V. Hud. (2012) Universal Sequence Replication, Reversible Polymerization and Early Functional Biopolymers: A Model for the Initiation of Prebiotic Sequence Evolution. PLoS ONE 7: e34166.
- S.I. Walker, L. Cisneros and P.C.W. Davies. (2012) Evolutionary Transitions and Top-Down Causation. Proceedings of Artificial Life XIII. p 283-290.
- M. Gleiser, J. Thorarinson, and S.I. Walker (2008) Punctuated Chirality. Orig. Life Evol. Biosph. 38: 499 – 508.
- S.I. Walker, H. Kim and P.C.W. Davies (2016) The Informational Architecture of the Cell. Phil. Trans. Roy. Soc. A 374 20150057.
- S.I. Walker, A. Frank and D. Grinspoon. "Intelligence as a planetary scale process" (2022) International Journal of Astrobiology 21(2):47-61.
- S. I. Walker Life as No One Knows It - The Physics of Life's Emergence. London 2024

== Awards and honors ==
Walker has won multiple awards for her teaching, writing, lectures, and contributions to her community. She had been awarded several fellowships:

- Out-of-the-Box Thinking Prize in the Foundational Questions Institute Essay Contest 2015 for her essay The Descent of Math.
- Fellow, ASU-SFI Center for Biosocial Complex Systems, Arizona State University and Santa Fe Institute 2015 – 2018
- Fourth Prize, Foundational Questions Institute Essay Contest 2012.
- NASA Postdoctoral Program Fellowship, NASA Astrobiology Institute 2011
- Gordon F. Hull Fellowship, Dartmouth College 2009 – 2010
- New Hampshire Space Grant/NASA Graduate Fellowship, NH Space Grant 2007 – 2008

== See also ==
- Assembly theory, under development by Leroy Cronin and Walker
