= SAGANet =

SAGANet (Social Action for Grassroots Astrobiology Network) is a social and collaborative web platform created to connect scientists and science enthusiasts who share interests in the research and culture of astrobiology.

== Background ==
SAGANet was founded in 2011 by Blue Marble Space Institute of Science scientists Zach Adam, Julia DeMarines, Heshan Illangkoon, Betül Kaçar, Sanjoy Som, and Sara Imari Walker. It was officially launched on April 12, 2012 (51 years after the first launch of a human into space and 31 years after the first launch of the Space Shuttle Columbia (STS-1)), and was announced publicly at the 2012 Astrobiology Science Conference.

SAGANet is named after the late Carl Sagan (The acronym is used with courtesy of the Carl Sagan Foundation) and builds upon his vision of a citizenry actively engaged in learning about the cosmos. SAGANet is designed to be an immersive virtual community where members interact in an environment of shared learning. SAGANet is currently funded by Blue Marble Space.

== Events ==
SAGANet has organized several events on the site and through various platforms that engage the general public. “Talk to an Astrobiologist” started off as a monthly event where a distinguished scientist is invited to interact with SAGANet members and later evolved with support of the NASA Astrobiology Program to become the YouTube livestream show called Ask an Astrobiologist. Past guests have included David Grinspoon, Paul Davies, Susan Schneider, Betül Kaçar, Kevin Hand, Charles Cockell, Zibi Turtle, and many others from across the realm of astrobiology research. SAGANet salon was a monthly event where members of the community interacted on topics bordering science and philosophy. In the past, SAGANet has hosted academic seminars from Arizona State University and Stockholm University.
