= Robert Duval =

French alchemist (1510–1567)

Robert Duval (c. 1510–1567), also referred as Robertus Vallensis, was a French alchemist. In 1886, John Ferguson stated that the De veritate et antiquitate artis chemicae by Duval stands out as 'the first history of chemistry.' This work was published in 1561, in Paris.
