= Adam Frank =

American physicist, astronomer and writer

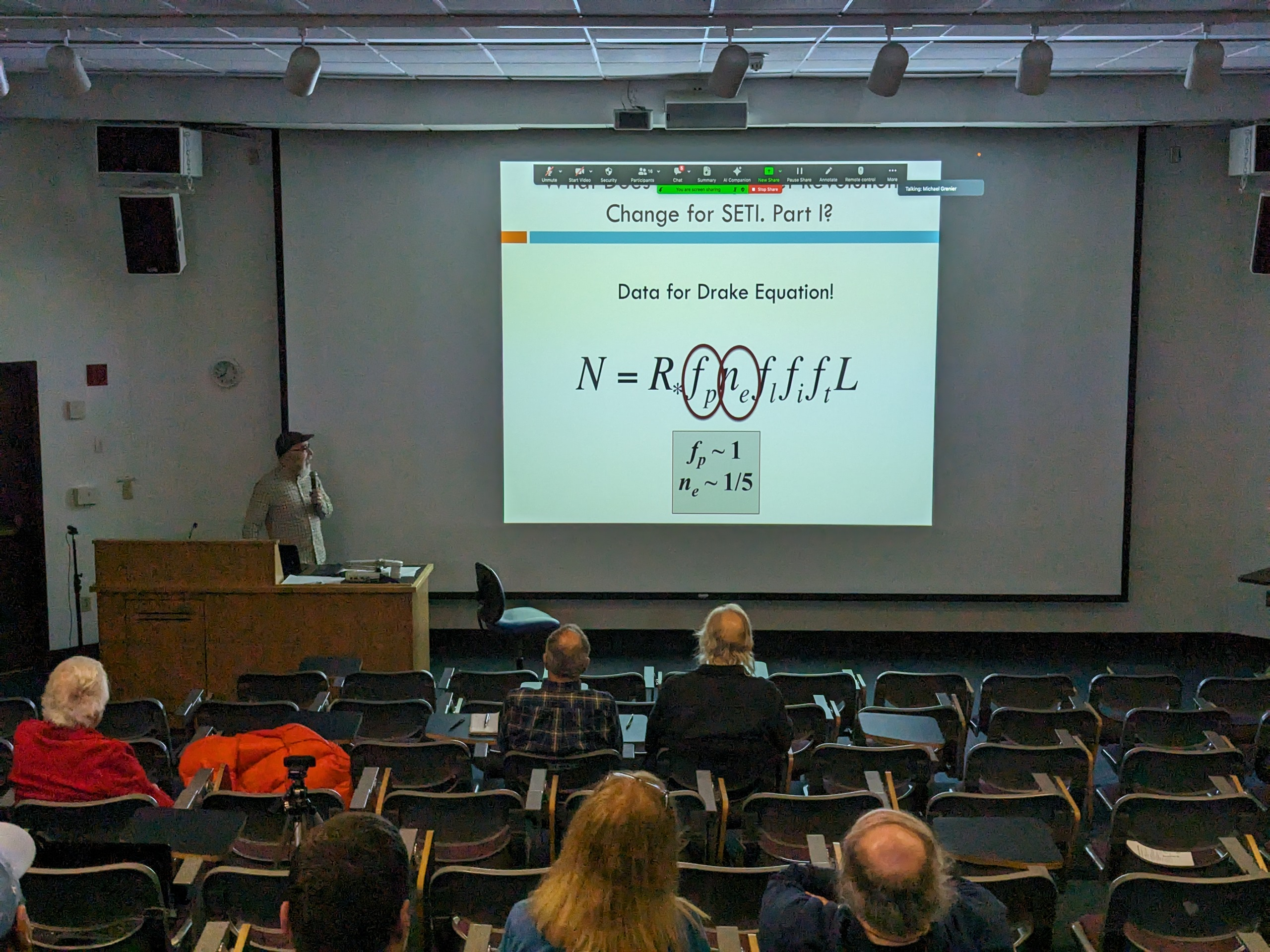
- Frank delivering a lecture at a Rochester Academy of Science meeting in 2024
- Born: 1962 (age 63–64)
- Education: University of Colorado; University of Washington
- Known for: Popular scientific writing
- Scientific career
- Fields: Physics, author, astrophysics professor
- Workplaces: Leiden University; University of Minnesota; University of Rochester

Adam Frank (born 1962) is an American physicist, astronomer, and writer. His scientific research has focused on computational astrophysics with an emphasis on star formation and late stages of stellar evolution. His work includes studies of exoplanet atmospheres and astrobiology. The latter include studies of the generic response of planets to the evolution of energy-intensive civilizations (exo-civilizations).

His popular writing has focused on issues of science in its cultural context. Topics include: issues of climate and the human future, technology, and cultural evolution; the nature of mind and experience; science and religion. He is a co-founder of the 13.7 Cosmos and Culture Blog that originated on National Public Radio (NPR), and he is a regular on-air contributor to NPR's All Things Considered. He is an occasional contributor to the New York Times.

He is the co-author with Gavin Schmidt of the Silurian hypothesis.

== Life and career ==
Frank was born on August 1, 1962, in Belleville, New Jersey. He graduated from the University of Colorado Boulder with a bachelor of arts in physics in 1984 and received his Ph.D. from the University of Washington in 1992. He held post-doctoral positions at Leiden University in the Netherlands and the University of Minnesota. In 1995, Frank was awarded the Hubble Fellowship. In 1996, he joined the faculty of the University of Rochester, where he is a professor of astrophysics.

Frank's research focus is astrophysical fluid dynamics. His research group developed the AstroBEAR adaptive mesh refinement code used for simulating magneto fluid dynamics flows in astrophysical contexts. Projects using AstroBEAR include the study of jets from protostars as well the evolution of planetary nebula at the end of the life of a solar-type star.

== Popular writing ==
In 2008, Frank authored an article for Discover magazine that explored scientific arguments regarding the Big Bang theory. Frank's first book, entitled The Constant Fire: Beyond the Science vs. Religion Debate, was published in 2009. It discussed the ongoing relationship between science and religion. His work appeared in 2009 Best Science and Nature Writing and in 2009 Best Buddhist Writing. In 2010, Frank co-founded the NPR 13.7 Cosmos and Culture Blog with Marcelo Gleiser.

A second book by Frank was published in fall 2011, About Time: Cosmology and Culture at the Twilight of the Big Bang. It explores the relationship between changing ideas in cosmology and the cultural idea of time. In 2016, Frank wrote an article entitled "Yes, There Have Been Aliens". It is based on his astronomical observations, which stated "a trillion civilizations still would have appeared over the course of cosmic history". Frank wrote a college-level science textbook entitled Astronomy At Play in the Cosmos. It was published in September 2016. Another book by Frank, Light of the Stars. Alien Worlds and the Fate of the Earth, was published on June 12, 2018. It attempts to reframe debates about climate change by showing it to be a generic phenomena that is likely to occur with almost any technological civilization on any planet. In the book, he explores what Frank calls the Astrobiology of the Anthropocene. Frank and Gleiser's blog moved to Orbiter magazine in 2018 with a new name, 13.8: Science, Culture, and Meaning.

Shortly after he and colleagues were awarded a grant from the National Aeronautics and Space Administration (NASA) to look for evidence of advanced technology on planets outside the Solar System, on May 30, 2021, Frank's guest essay, I'm a Physicist Who Searches for Aliens. U.F.O.s Don't Impress Me. was published in the New York Times. In the article, he noted the mathematical probabilities over time for extraterrestrial civilizations in the universe, however, he put forth plausible explanations for the nature of the phenomenon described in reports that have appeared in media since 1947 and lamented about the lack of scientific study of such phenomenon, which he would encourage. Furthermore, he responded to assertions that the aliens presumed to be evident in these reports could have been intending to remain hidden, by asserting, "...if the mission of these aliens calls for stealth, they seem surprisingly incompetent. You would think that creatures technologically capable of traversing the mind-boggling distances between the stars would also know how to turn off their high beams at night and to elude our primitive infrared cameras."

In September 2023, astrophysicists, including Frank, questioned the overall current view of the universe, in the form of the Standard Model of Cosmology, based on the latest James Webb Space Telescope studies.

== Awards and recognition ==
- 1995 Hubble Fellow
- 1997-2002 NSF CAREER Grant
- 1999 American Astronomical Society Solar Physics Division Popular Writing Award for a Scientist
- 2009 Best American Science and Nature Writing

== Bibliography ==
- "In the nursery of the stars". Discover. 17 (2): 38–45. February 1996.
- The Constant Fire: Beyond the Science vs Religion Debate, University of California Press (10 January 2009), ISBN 978-0-520-26586-8
- The End of the Beginning: Cosmology Culture and Time at the Twilight of the Big Bang, (27 September 2010), ISBN 978-0-452-27606-2
- Light of the Stars. Alien Worlds and the Fate of the Earth, (12 June 2018), ISBN 978-0-393-60901-1
- The Little Book of Aliens, (24 October 2023), ISBN 978-0-063-27973-5
- Co-written with Marcelo Gleiser, Evan Thompson The Blind Spot: Why Science Cannot Ignore Human Experience, (5 March 2024), ISBN 978-0-262-04880-4
