= George Barger =

British chemist (1878–1939)

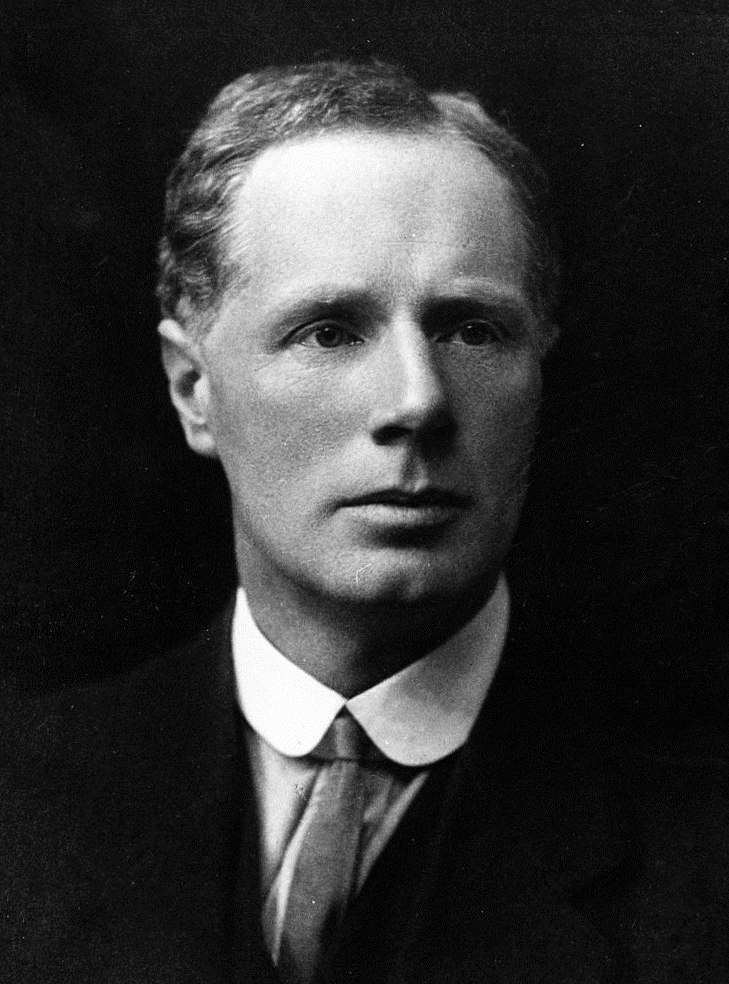
George Barger in the 1920s

George Barger FRS FRSE FCS LLD (4 April 1878 – 5 January 1939) was a British chemist.

== Life ==
He was born to an English mother, Eleanor Higginbotham, and Gerrit Barger, a Dutch engineer in Manchester, England.

He was educated at Utrecht and The Hague High School. He subsequently attended King's College, Cambridge for his undergraduate degree and University College London to do a doctorate of science. His main work focused on the study of alkaloids and investigations of simple nitrogenous compounds of biological importance. Barger identified tyramine as one of the compounds responsible for the biological activity of ergot extracts. He also made significant contributions to the synthesis of thyroxine. and vitamin B_{1}

In 1936 and 1937 he worked with Joseph John Blackie searching for materials for research.

Barger was elected a Fellow of the Royal Society in May, 1919 and awarded their Davy Medal in 1938.

Barger was married to Florence Emily Thomas in 1904 and had two sons and one daughter.

He died at Aeschi, Switzerland.

== Positions ==
- Regius Professor of Chemistry, University of Glasgow, 1937–1939
- Professor of chemistry in relation to medicine, University of Edinburgh, 1919–1937
- Professor of chemistry, Royal Holloway College, University of London, 1913–1914
- Head of Chemical Department, Goldsmiths' College, 1909–1913
- Fellow of King's College, Cambridge, 1903–1909

== Publications ==
- Some Applications of Organic Chemistry to Biology and Chemistry (1930)
- Organic Chemistry for Medical Students (1932)

== Bibliography ==
- Britons discover synthetic thyroxin, T.R. Ybarra, New York Times, Sunday 12 December 1927
