= Joseph John Blackie =

Scottish chemist

Joseph John Blackie FRSE FRIC (1894–30 October 1946) was a Scottish research chemist.

== Life ==
He was born in Duns, Berwickshire.

During the First World War he served as a staff sergeant in the Royal Army Medical Corps, serving in Gallipoli, Egypt and France.

After the war he obtained a post as laboratory assistant at Duncan Flockhart & Co in Edinburgh and at the same time studied at the Royal Dispensary School of Pharmacy in Edinburgh 1920-22. By 1930 he was a partner in Duncan Flockhart & Co. Five years later Blackie received a PhD from the University of Edinburgh.

In 1936 and 1937 he studied the alkaloids of the genus Senecio with Prof George Barger.

During the Second World War he and his staff were heavily involved in the production of anaesthetics and painkillers.

He died in Edinburgh on 30 October 1946.

== Positions held ==
- Partner, Duncan Flockhart & Co (1950)
- Member of the Edinburgh Merchant Company (1932)
- Governor of Heriot-Watt College (1934)
- Fellow of the Royal Institute of Chemistry (1936)
- Fellow of the Royal Society of Edinburgh (1937)
- Member of the Scottish Wholesale Druggists Association.
- Chairman of the Board of Examiners for the Pharmaceutical Society of Great Britain (1938 until death)
