= Thomas Anderson (chemist) =

British chemist

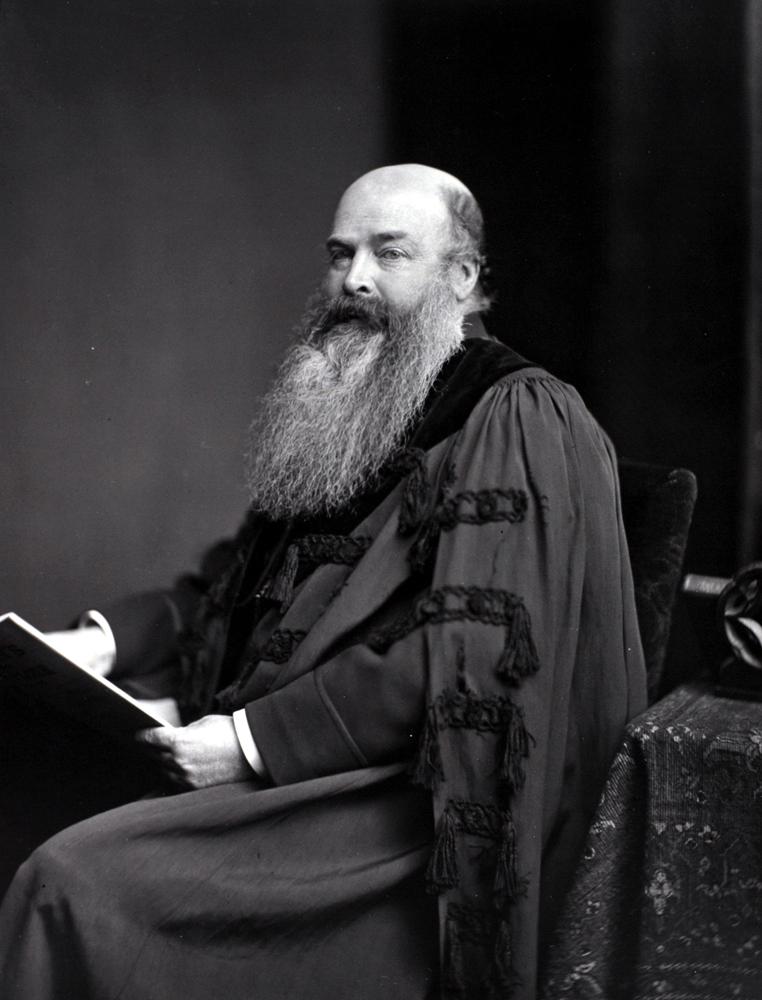
- Born: 2 July 1819; Leith, Scotland
- Died: 2 November 1874 (aged 55); Chiswick, England
- Education: University of Edinburgh
- Awards: Royal Medal (1872); Keith Medal (1853-55)
- Scientific career
- Fields: chemistry
- Workplaces: University of Glasgow

Thomas Anderson (2 July 1819 – 2 November 1874) was a 19th-century British chemist. In 1853 his work on alkaloids led him to discover the correct formula/composition for codeine. In 1868 he discovered pyridine and related organic compounds such as picoline through studies on the distillation of bone oil and other animal matter.

As well as his work on organic chemistry, Anderson made important contributions to agricultural chemistry, writing over 130 reports on soils, fertilisers and plant diseases. He kept abreast of all areas of science, and was able to advise his colleague Joseph Lister on Pasteur's germ theory and the use of carbolic acid as an antiseptic.

== Biographys ==
Born in Leith, Thomas Anderson graduated from the University of Edinburgh with a medical doctorate in 1841. Having developed an interest in chemistry during his medical studies, he then spent several years studying chemistry in Europe, including spells under Jöns Jakob Berzelius in Sweden and Justus von Liebig in Germany. Returning to Edinburgh, he worked at the University of Edinburgh and at the Highland and Agricultural Society of Scotland. In 1852, he was appointed Regius Professor of Chemistry at the University of Glasgow and remained in that post for the remainder of his career. In 1854, he became one of the editors of the Edinburgh New Philosophical Journal. In 1872, Anderson was awarded a Royal Medal from the Royal Society "for his investigations on the organic bases of Dippells animal oil; on codeine; on the crystallized constituents of opium; on piperin and on papaverin; and for his researches in physiological and animal chemistry."

His later years were marred by a progressive neurological disease which may have been syphilis. He resigned his chair in early 1874, and died later that year in Chiswick.

He was succeeded by John Ferguson.
