= Betül Kaçar =

Turkish academic

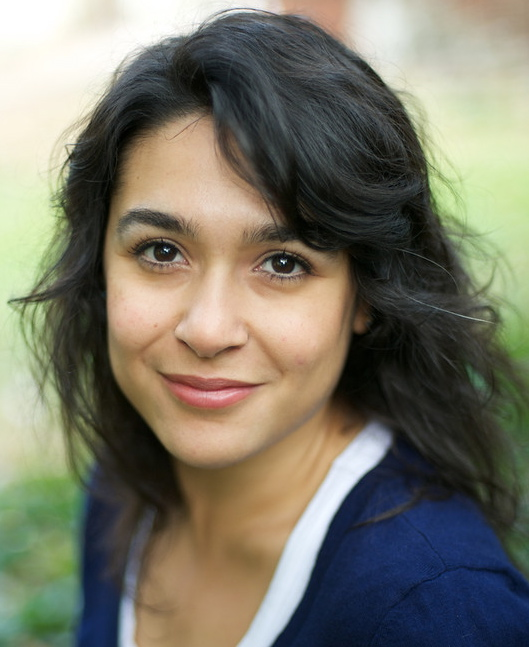
- Born: Istanbul, Turkey
- Education: Emory University; Marmara University
- Known for: Paleobiology, Astrobiology
- Scientific career
- Workplaces: University of Wisconsin-Madison; Earth-Life Science Institute; NASA; Harvard University (2014–2018)

Betül Kacar is a Turkish-American astrobiologist and an assistant professor at the University of Wisconsin-Madison. She directs a NASA Research Center exploring the essential attributes of life, its origins and how they should shape our notions of habitability and the search for life on other worlds.

== Education and career ==
Kacar was born in Istanbul. She was the first woman in her family to receive formal education. She studied chemistry at Marmara University. She received Howard Hughes Medical Institute undergraduate fellowship to spend a summer conducting scientific research in Emory University studying organic chemistry. She returned to Emory University, and eventually earned a PhD in Biomolecular Chemistry in enzyme structure-function relationship. Kacar transitioned to study origins of life after Ph.D. She was appointed as a NASA postdoctoral fellow at Georgia Institute of Technology. She was awarded a NASA scholarship in 2011, followed by funding from the NASA Astrobiology Institute and Exobiology Branch in 2013. She joined Harvard University in 2014, where she led an independent research group as a fellow in the Department of Organismic and Evolutionary Biology. In 2015, she received the Templeton Fellowship and became a member of the Harvard Origins Initiative. Kacar was named NASA Early Career Faculty Fellow in 2019. In 2020, she received the Scialog fellowship for her studies on life in the universe by the Research Corporation and Science Advancement. She has served on the National Academies' "A Science Strategy for the Human Exploration of Mars" panel. In this role, she contributed to determining NASA's science objectives and priorities for Mars exploration. In 2025 she received the Keck Foundation Award to study evolution of ancient metabolisms.

== Research ==
Kacar's research encompasses the origins of life, early evolution, life in the universe and how the molecular mechanisms of evolution can be understood. She currently leads a NASA Astrobiology Center in molecular paleobiology to understand alien planets and ancient life. She is the first Turkish woman and the youngest scientist to lead a NASA research center. She was the first to resurrect an ancient gene inside a modern microbial genome. She coined the term paleophenotype, reconstructing and examining the evolutionary history of contemporary components and then tying their phenotypes into biosignatures to provide insight into innovations that are grounded in the rock record and thus in the geological and ecological context. In 2020, she proposed a possible application of prebiotic chemistry, protospermia, sending the chemical capacity for life to emerge on another planetary body. Her research team defined "evolutionary stalling" as an evolutionary mechanism to prevent a module from reaching its local performance peak and thereby imposes a genetic load, i.e., the organism carrying a stalled module suffers a fitness cost relative to an organism whose module performance is optimal.

Kacar is a professor at the University of Wisconsin, in the Department of Bacteriology. She is also an associate professor at the Earth-Life Science Institute at the Tokyo Institute of Technology. She has been described as a "prominent member" of the NASA Astrobiology Institute. She has received over $9 million of grant funding as a lead investigator.

== Community work ==
Kacar has co-founded the only astrobiology outreach and grassroots network SAGANet that serves teachers and students in astrobiology research globally. In 2011 Kacar became a member of the Blue Marble Space Institute of Science. She was formerly part of the Global Science Coordinator for ELSI Origins Network aiming to increase early-career research scientist participation in the field of origins of life. She discussed finding alien life in SXSW in 2020. She partnered with the 2020 UN Women Generation Equality Campaign to support education of girls and women globally.

== Awards and honors ==
Asteroid 284919 Kaçar, discovered by astronomers using the WISE space telescope in 2010, was named in her honor. The official naming citation was published by the Working Group for Small Bodies Nomenclature of the IAU on 8 November 2021.
