= Dinosauroid =

Hypothetical species and thought experiment

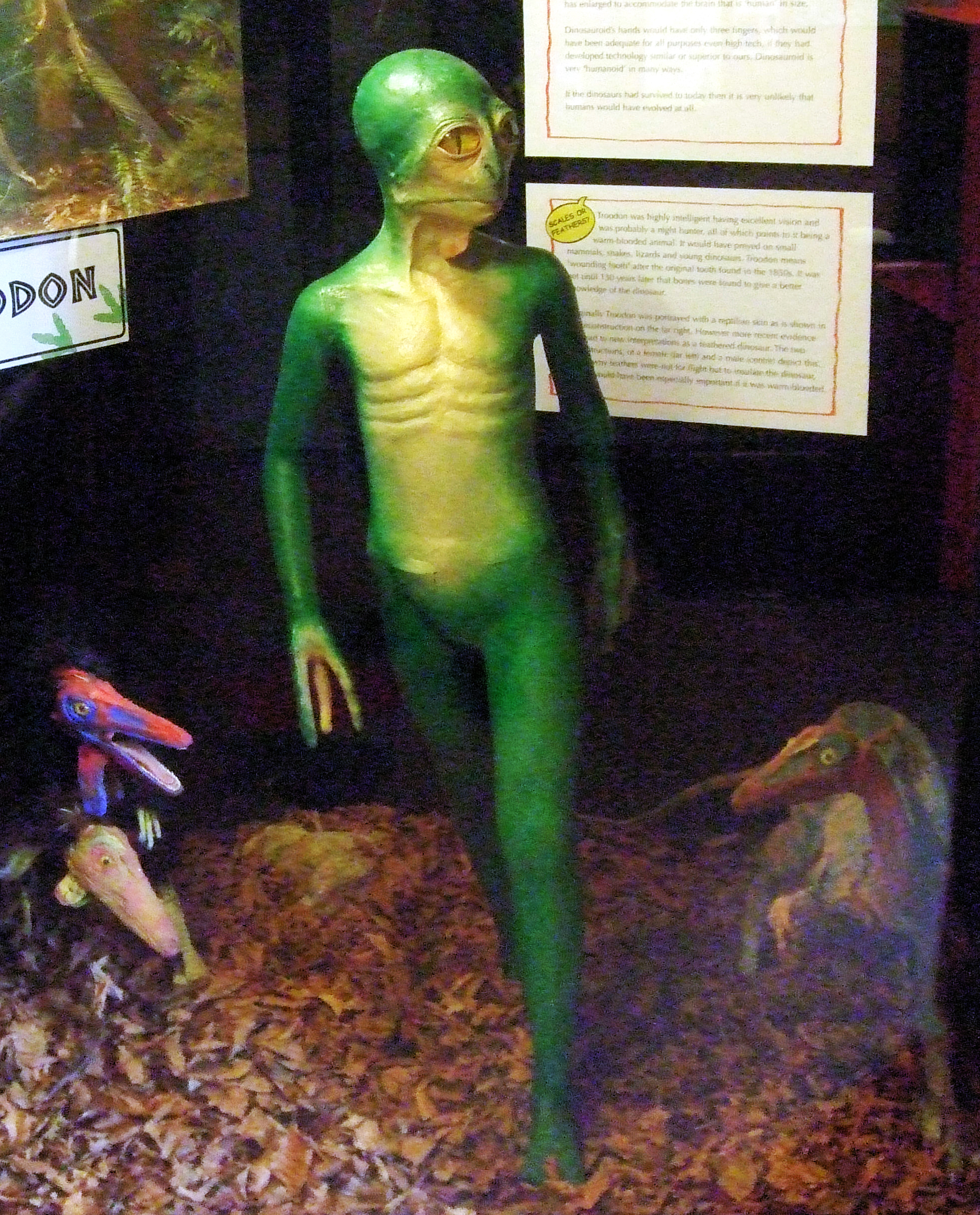
A model of the hypothetical dinosauroid, Dinosaur Museum, Dorchester

The dinosauroid is a hypothetical species created by Dale A. Russell in 1982. Russell theorized that if a dinosaur such as Stenonychosaurus had not perished in the Cretaceous–Paleogene extinction event, its descendants might have evolved to fill the same ecological niche as humans. While the theory has been met with criticism from other scientists, the dinosauroid has been featured widely in books and documentaries since the theory's inception.

== Theory ==
In 1982, Dale A. Russell, then curator of vertebrate fossils at the Canadian Museum of Nature in Ottawa, conjectured a possible evolutionary path for Stenonychosaurus, if it had not perished in the Cretaceous–Paleogene extinction event, suggesting that it could have evolved into intelligent beings similar in body plan to humans. Over geologic time, Russell noted that there had been a steady increase in the encephalization quotient or EQ (the relative brain weight when compared to other species with the same body weight) among the dinosaurs. Russell had discovered the first Troodontid skull, and noted that, while its EQ was low compared to humans, it was six times higher than that of other dinosaurs. Russell suggested that if the trend in Stenonychosaurus evolution had continued to the present, its brain case could by now measure 1,100 cm^{3}, comparable to that of a human.

Troodontids had semi-manipulative fingers, able to grasp and hold objects to a certain degree, and binocular vision. Russell proposed that his dinosauroid, like members of the troodontid family, would have had large eyes and three fingers on each hand, one of which would have been partially opposed. Russell also speculated that the dinosauroid would have had a toothless beak. As with most modern reptiles (and birds), he conceived of its genitalia as internal. Russell speculated that it would have required a navel, as a placenta aids the development of a large brain case. However, it would not have possessed mammary glands, and would have fed its young, as some birds do, on regurgitated food. He speculated that its language would have sounded somewhat like bird song.

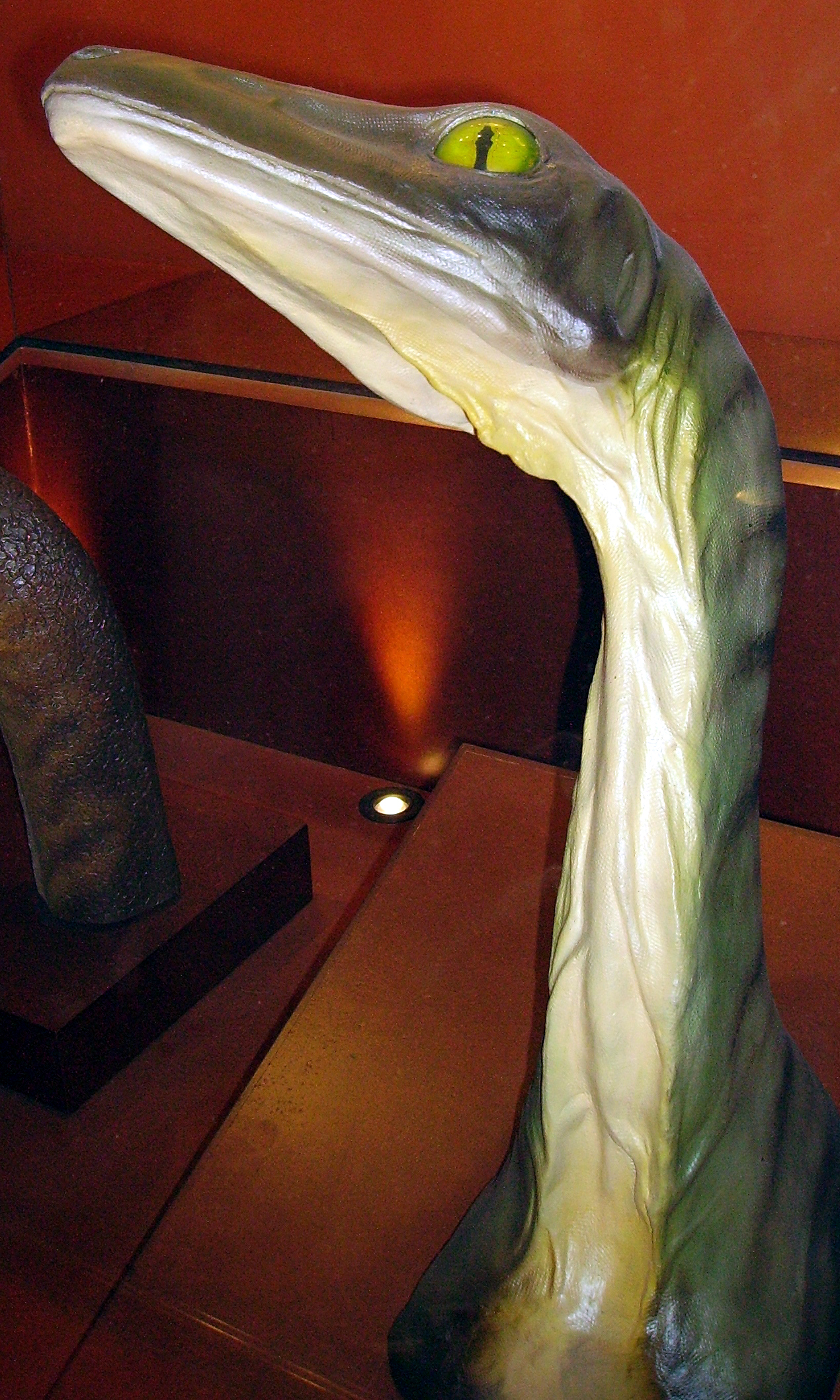
Head and neck of Dale Russell and Ron Seguin's Stenonychosaurus sculpture, Natural History Museum, London

Reflecting on the dinosauroid theory, Russell said in an interview in 2000;

"The 'dinosauroid' was a thought experiment, based on an observable, general trend toward larger relative brain size in terrestrial vertebrates through geologic time, and the energetic efficiency of an upright posture in slow-moving, bipedal animals. It seems to me that such speculation remains acceptable, particularly if directed toward non-anthropoid anatomical configurations. However, I very nearly decided not to publish the exercise because of the damaging effects it might have had on the credibility of my work in general. Most people remained polite, although there were hostile reactions from those with 'ultra-quantitative' and 'ultra-intuitive' world views."

=== Sculpture ===
Dale Russell worked in collaboration with taxidermist and artist Ron Seguin to create models of both a Stenonychosaurus and the fictional dinosauroid. While the model of Stenonychosaurus was constructed to reflect the biology of Stenonychosaurus as accurately as possible, the dinosauroid was wholly fabricated. The models were made in tandem, the Stenonychosaurus model taking about seven months to construct and the dinosauroid model taking about three and a half months to construct. The two models were built using similar techniques, built up over a skeleton of the creature, the final sculpt then being recast in fiberglass and filled with sand.

== Reception ==
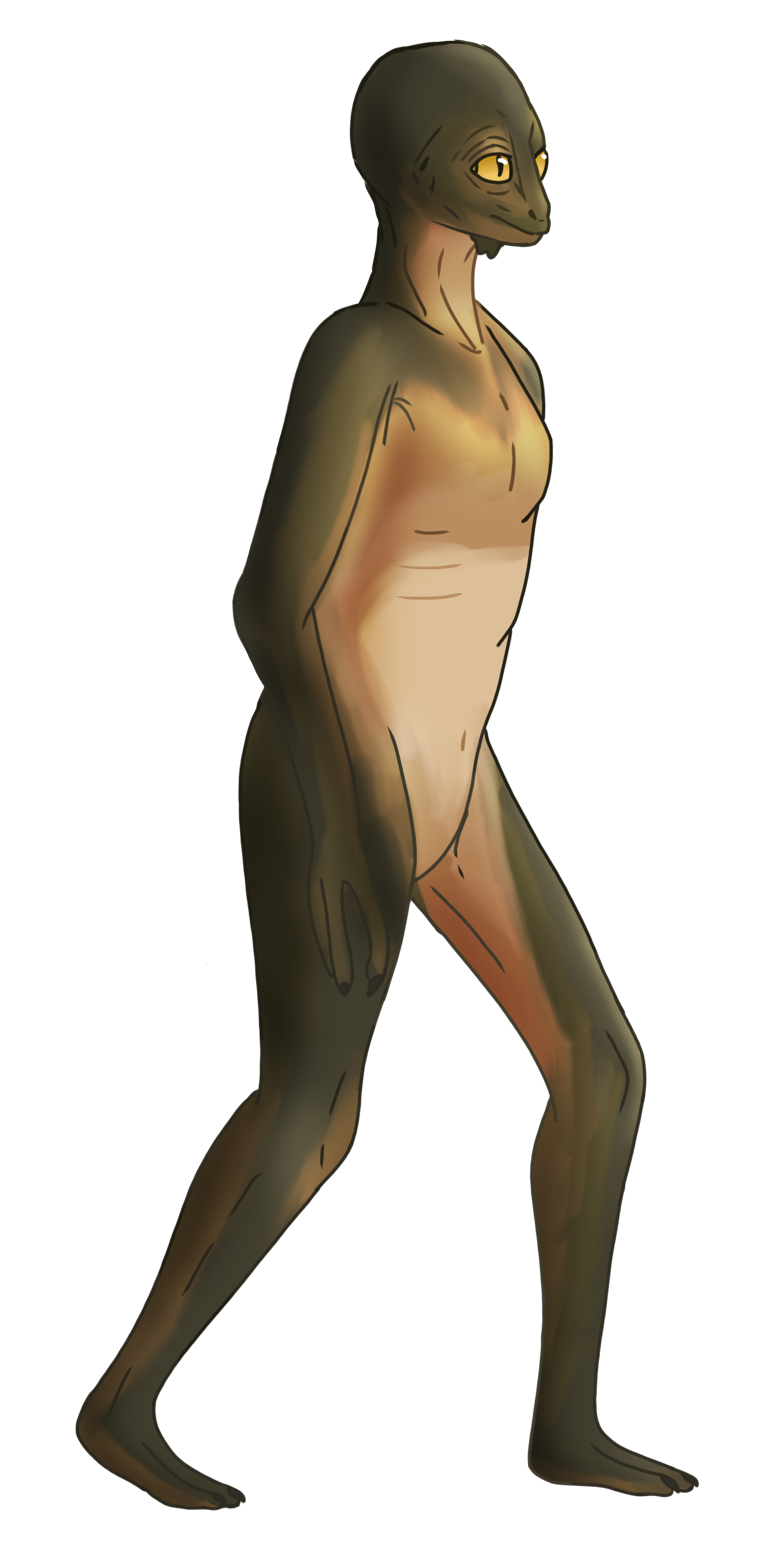
Illustration of the original dinosauroid design

Russell's thought experiment has been met with criticism from other paleontologists since the 1980s, many of whom point out that his Dinosauroid is overly anthropomorphic. Gregory S. Paul (1988) and Thomas R. Holtz, Jr., consider it "suspiciously human" and Darren Naish has argued that a large-brained, highly intelligent troodontid would retain a more standard theropod body plan, with a horizontal posture and long tail, and would probably manipulate objects with the snout and feet in the manner of a bird, rather than with human-like "hands".

As Darren Naish explained in a 2012 Scientific American article on the subject of the dinosauroid,

"The reason that we humans have the body shape that we do is not – I think – because it's the 'best' body shape for a smart, big-brained biped to have, it is instead the result of our specific lineage's evolutionary history. Given that, so far as we know, the humanoid body shape has evolved just once, we simply have no way of knowing whether it's a particularly 'good' morphology or not."

Some authors, however, had more favourable opinions on the dinosauroid, with David Norman remarking in the 1985 book The Illustrated Encyclopedia of Dinosaurs that “Such an idea is an obviously fanciful, though provocative thought.”

The dinosauroid theory, along with the often repeated fact that Troodontids were the most intelligent dinosaurs, may have led to an overestimation of its intelligence among the general public; while Stenonychosaurus did have a larger brain to body ratio when compared to other theropod dinosaurs of its time, its intelligence was likely comparable to that of modern birds such as bustards and emus.

== Modernisation ==
Since Russell's original work in the 1980s, alternate interpretations of intelligence in non-avian dinosaurs have been depicted in art. The collaborative work of Turkish artist C. M. Kosemen and Canadian comic book artist Simon Roy is a particularly notable example of a modern take on the dinosauroid concept. These art pieces from the late 2000s show dinosaurs with anatomy more reflective of modern paleontological understanding and retain more of their ancestral, theropod features. These designs for a dinosauroid were based on Darren Naish's writings on Russell and Seguin's original.

Kosemen and Roy's work expands upon the original concept by creating a wide range of different dinosauroid species and placing them inside of an entirely speculative ecosystem in a world without the Cretaceous–Paleogene extinction. These new dinosauroids are more inspired by birds and their tool use capability, with some inspiration from early hunter-gatherer societies as well.

== See also ==
- The New Dinosaurs
- Silurian hypothesis
