= John Ferguson (chemist) =

Scottish chemist and bibliographer

John Ferguson FRSE LLD (24 January 1837 – 2 November 1916) was a Scottish chemist and bibliographer. He is noted for the early alchemy and chemistry bibliography Bibliotheca chemica. He was generally nicknamed Soda Ferguson. The Ferguson Collection, a collection of 7,500 books and manuscripts from his personal library is held by the University of Glasgow.

== Life ==
Ferguson was born on 24 January 1838 in Alloa, Scotland, the son of Margaret Kidd and William Ferguson who married on 27 October 1834 at Alloa. Both is parents were born in Alloa. He had one sibling, a sister named Jane Anne Ferguson who was born on 2 March 1835 at Alloa. Both his parents died at 13 Newton Place, Glasgow. His father in December 1870 and his mother on 19 January 1884. His sister Jane died on 24 June 1891 at London, England. He moved at an early age to Glasgow and attended Glasgow High School.

He graduated from the University of Glasgow with a BA in 1861 and an MA in 1862. In 1874, he was appointed the Regius Professor of Chemistry at the University of Glasgow, in place of Prof Thomas Anderson.

He was elected a Fellow of the Royal Society of Edinburgh in 1888. His proposers were Sir William Thomson (Lord Kelvin), James Thomson Bottomley, Peter Guthrie Tait and Alexander Crum Brown. The University of St Andrews awarded him an honorary doctorate (LLD).

Ferguson had an extensive library of books pertaining to alchemy, early chemistry, metallurgy, mineralogy, Paracelsus, the Romani language, the Rosicrucians, and witchcraft. In 1921 the University of Glasgow purchased about 11,000 of the books for the sum of £7,000.

He died of heart disease at his home, 6 Claremont Terrace in Glasgow, on 3 November 1916. He was aged 78.

He is buried in the family burial plot in Greenside Cemetery, Alloa alongside his parents and his sister Jane.

== Memberships ==
- Royal Philosophical Society of Glasgow - President (1892–1895)
- Glasgow Archaeological Society - President (1891–1894)
- Royal Society of Edinburgh - Fellow
- Society of Antiquaries of Scotland - Fellow
- Chemical Society - Fellow
- Royal Institute of Chemistry - Fellow
- British Archaeological Association
- French Archaeological Society
- Honorary Fellow of the Imperial Military Academy of Medicine in Petrograd
- Royal Company of Archers

== Family ==
He married Helen Baird in 1882.

== Bibliography ==
- Recent Inquiries Into the Early History of Chemistry (1879)
- The first history of chemistry (1886) Describes Robert Duval as the first historian of chemistry.
- Some early treatises on technological chemistry (1888)
- Bibliotheca chemica: a catalogue of the alchemical, chemical and pharmaceutical books in the collection of the late James Young of Kelly and Durris (1906) in 2 vols.
- Books of secrets. A paper read before the Bibliographical Society, 21 April 1913 (1914)
