= Silurian hypothesis =

Thought experiment to assess ability to detect evidence of a prior advanced civilization

The Silurian hypothesis is a thought experiment which assesses the ability of modern science to detect evidence of a prior advanced civilization, perhaps several million years ago. The most probable indications of such a civilization might be carbon, radioactive elements or temperature variation. The name "Silurian" was derived from a sapient species in the BBC science fiction series Doctor Who, who had established an advanced civilization prior to humanity.

Astrophysicist Adam Frank and climate scientist Gavin Schmidt proposed the "Silurian Hypothesis" in a 2018 paper which explored the possibility of detecting an advanced pre-human civilization in the geological record. They argued that finding direct evidence such as technological artifacts would be unlikely because of the rarity of fossilization and Earth's exposed surface. Instead, researchers might find indirect evidence such as climate changes, anomalies in sediment, or traces of nuclear waste. The hypothesis also speculated that artifacts from past civilizations might be found on the Moon and Mars, where erosion and tectonic activity would be less likely to erase evidence. The concept of pre-human civilizations has been explored in popular culture, including novels, television shows, short stories, and video games.

Jan Zalasiewicz, a geologist, paleontologist and emeritus professor at the University of Leicester in the UK, claims that Schmidt and Frank seriously underestimate how much evidence would be left by an advanced civilization.

== Explanation ==
The idea was presented in a 2018 paper by Adam Frank, an astrophysicist at the University of Rochester, and Gavin Schmidt, director of the Goddard Institute for Space Studies. Frank and Schmidt imagined the existence of an advanced civilization before humans and considered whether it would "be possible to detect an industrial civilization in the geological record". They argued that as early as the Carboniferous period (~350 million years ago) "there has been sufficient fossil carbon to fuel an industrial civilization comparable with our own". However, they also wrote: "While we strongly doubt that any previous industrial civilization existed before our own, asking the question in a formal way that articulates explicitly what evidence for such a civilization might look like raises its own useful questions related both to astrobiology and to Anthropocene studies." The term "Silurian hypothesis" was inspired by the fictional species the Silurians in the British television series Doctor Who.

According to Frank and Schmidt, since fossilization is relatively rare and little of Earth's exposed surface has survived from before the Quaternary time period (~2.5 million years ago), there would be low probability of finding direct evidence of a previous civilization, such as technological artifacts. The researchers concluded that after a great time span, modern humans would be more likely to find indirect evidence such as rapid changes in temperature or climate (as occurred during the Paleocene–Eocene Thermal Maximum ~55 million years ago); evidence of tapping geothermal power sources; or anomalies of chemical composition in sediment such as evidence of artificial fertilizers or isotope ratios (There is no naturally occurring plutonium-244 outside a supernova, for example, so the presence of this isotope could indicate a technologically advanced civilization). Objects that could be evidence of past civilizations include plastics and nuclear waste residues buried deep underground or on the ocean floor. The paper also mentioned the natural fission reactors at Oklo, Gabon, which were active some two billion years BP. None of the transuranic elements produced are still present, having decayed to longer-lived or stable daughter nuclides, but the depletion of ^{235}U and the characteristic isotope ratios of fission products confirm that fission had occurred.

Frank and Schmidt speculated that such a civilization could have gone to space and left artifacts on other celestial bodies, such as the Moon and Mars. Evidence for artifacts on these two worlds would be easier to find than on Earth, where erosion and tectonic activity would have erased much of it. Frank first approached Schmidt to discuss how to detect alien civilizations by their potential impact upon climate through the study of ice cores and tree rings. They both realized that the hypothesis could be expanded and applied to Earth and humanity, where humans have been in their current form for the past 300,000 years and have had sophisticated technology for only the last few centuries.

The idea has been connected to the cryptoterrestrial hypothesis explaining the existence of UFOs.

== History in science fiction ==
The Silurians from Doctor Who were a race of reptilian humanoids from Earth's distant past who made their first appearance in the show in 1970. (The fictional Silurians actually flourished in the Eocene, not the Silurian.) Frank and Schmidt cited Inherit the Stars, a 1977 novel by J. P. Hogan which contained a similar idea, but say they were surprised by how rarely the concept was explored in science fiction.

An early borderline example occurred in H. P. Lovecraft's "The Shadow Out of Time", published in 1926. This posited the Great Race of Yith as having existed in Earth's distant past. In this case, the minds of the Great Race originated with an extraterrestrial intelligence which took over the bodies of Earth-based life-forms.

A common theme in science fiction is that dinosaurs evolved into sentience and tool use, as in the novels The Dreaming Dragons (1980, revised as The Dreaming) by Damien Broderick and Toolmaker Koan (1987) by John McLoughlin. Broderick's novel received the Ditmar Award. McLoughlin's novel also deals with the Fermi paradox. The trope of sentient dinosaur species appeared in "Distant Origin", a 1997 episode of Star Trek: Voyager, which has the Voyager encounter the Voth, a starfaring species that appear to have evolved on Earth from dinosaurs. Discussing this theory with a Voth scientist, series regular Chakotay speculates that their ancestors evolved on an isolated continent that was destroyed by cataclysm, with all traces now on the seabed or under kilometres of rock.

Another fictional example is Larry Niven's 1980 short story "The Green Marauder", in which an alien over 700 million years old (a result of relativistic travel) tells a human about the last time it visited Earth, and the hopeless plea from Earth's anaerobic civilization for help against the growing environmental threat of chlorophyll.

== See also ==
- Ancient astronauts
- Dinosauroid
- Drake equation
- Out-of-place artifact
- Paleocene–Eocene thermal maximum
- Permian–Triassic extinction event
- Precambrian rabbit
- The Science of Discworld, a 1999 book hypothesising on previous civilisations
- The World Without Us
- Time capsule
- Xenoarchaeology
