= Regius Professor of Chemistry (Glasgow) =

Regius Chair of Chemistry University of Glasgow
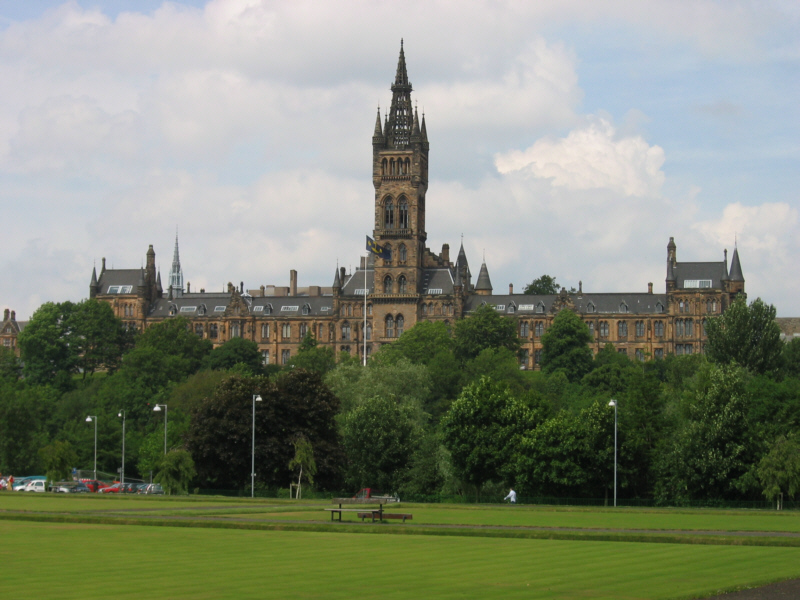
- Incumbent; Leroy (Lee) Cronin since 2013
- Formation: 1817
- First holder: Thomas Thomson
- Website: www.gla.ac.uk/chemistry

The Regius Chair of Chemistry at the University of Glasgow was founded in 1817 by King George III, who also established the Regius Chairs of Surgery and Natural History at the university. The chair originated from a lectureship in chemistry, established in 1747.

== Regius Professors of Chemistry ==
The first Professor was Thomas Thomson, inventor of the saccharometer and discoverer of Thomsonite. He was succeeded by Thomas Anderson, who assisted Joseph Lister, Regius Professor of Surgery, with his work on antisepsis, and who discovered pyridine. The chair was later held by Nobel laureate Sir Derek Barton.

The current occupant is Professor Leroy Cronin.

- Thomas Thomson FRS FLS FRSE (1818)
- Thomas Anderson (1852)
- John Ferguson FRS (1874)
- George Henderson FRS (1919)
- George Barger FRS FRSE FCS LLD (1937)
- Sir James Cook (1939)
- Sir Derek Barton FRS FRSE (1955)
- Ralph Raphael CBE FRS FRSE (1957)
- Gordon Kirby (1972)
- Philip Kocienski FRS (1997)
- Charles Wilson (2003)
- Leroy Cronin FRSE FRSC (2013)

== See also ==
- List of Professorships at the University of Glasgow
