= Marcelo Gleiser =

Brazilian physicist and astronomer (born 1959)

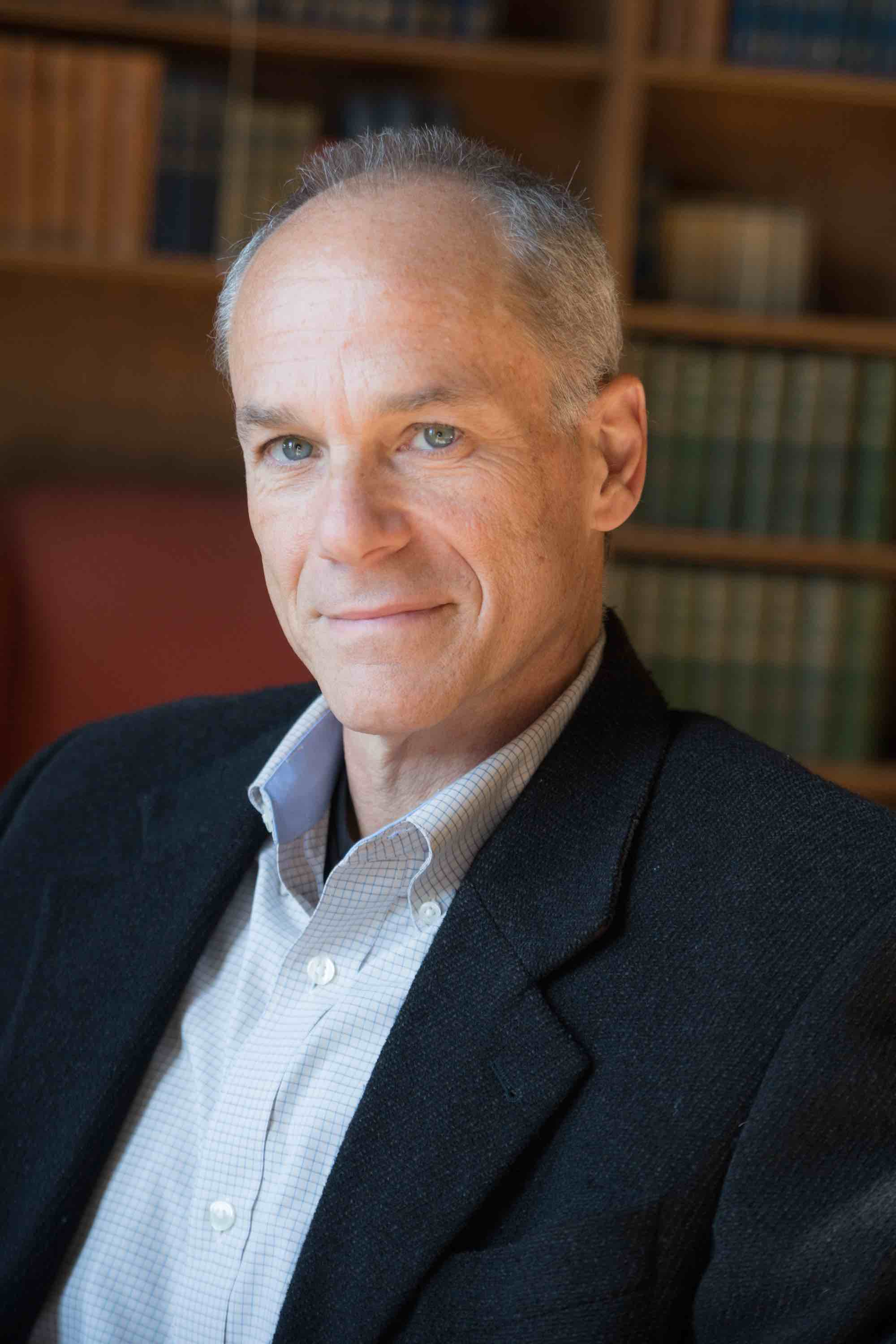
- Gleiser in 2015
- Born: 19 March 1959 (age 67); Rio de Janeiro, Brazil
- Education: Pontifical Catholic University of Rio de Janeiro (BA); Federal University of Rio de Janeiro (MSc); King's College London (PhD)
- Awards: Templeton Prize (2019)
- Scientific career
- Fields: Physics
- Workplaces: Dartmouth College; Fermilab; Kavli Institute for Theoretical Physics; NASA; NATO

Marcelo Gleiser (born 19 March 1959) is a Brazilian-American physicist and astronomer. He is the Appleton Professor of Natural Philosophy and a professor of physics and astronomy at Dartmouth College.

== Education ==
Gleiser received his bachelor's degree in 1981 from the Pontifical Catholic University of Rio de Janeiro, his M.Sc. degree in 1982 from the Federal University of Rio de Janeiro, and his Ph.D. in 1986 from King's College London. He was a postdoctoral researcher at Fermilab until 1988, and thereafter until 1991 at the Kavli Institute for Theoretical Physics.

== Academic career ==
Since 1991 Gleiser has taught at Dartmouth College, where he was awarded the Appleton Professorship of Natural Philosophy in 1999, and is currently a professor of physics and astronomy.

Gleiser is the co-discoverer of "oscillons," time-dependent long-lived field configurations which are present in many physical systems from cosmology to vibrating grains. In 2012, he pioneered the use of concepts from information theory as a measure of complexity in nature.

Gleiser wrote a weekly science column for the Brazilian Folha de S.Paulo newspaper from 1997 to 2017 and currently writes for BigThink. He is a Fellow of the American Physical Society, and served as its General Councilor. He has been awarded the Presidential Faculty Fellows Award from the White House and the National Science Foundation. He is also a member of the Brazilian Academy of Philosophy. He is the co-founder of a science and culture blog, hosted by National Public Radio from 2011 to 2018, and now hosted by BigThink under the new name 13.8: Science, Culture, and Meaning. In 2015 he founded the Institute for Cross-Disciplinary Engagement at Dartmouth, dedicated to foster a constructive dialogue between the sciences and the humanities. On 19 March 2019 he received the Templeton Prize for his works exploring the complex relationship between science, philosophy, and religion as complementary pathways for humankind's search for meaning. In 2024, Gleiser founded a think tank in Tuscany called The Island of Knowledge, dedicated to addressing foundational scientific and philosophical questions and to fostering planetary health and human flourishing. Gleiser is the author of over 100 refereed articles and thousands of essays, as well as 8 books in English and 16 in Portuguese translated into 18 languages.

In September 2023, astrophysicists, including Gleiser, questioned the overall current view of the universe, in the form of the Standard Model of Cosmology, based on the latest James Webb Space Telescope studies.

== Bibliography (English) ==
- The Dancing Universe: From Creation Myths to the Big Bang, Plume (1 November 1998), ISBN 978-0-452-27606-2
- The Prophet and the Astronomer: Apocalyptic Science and the End of the World, W. W. Norton & Company (21 July 2003), ISBN 978-0-393-32431-0
- A Tear at the Edge of Creation: A Radical New Vision for Life in an Imperfect Universe, Free Press (6 April 2010), ISBN 978-1-4391-0832-1
- The Island of Knowledge: The Limits of Science and the Search for Meaning, Basic Books (3 June 2014), ISBN 978-0-4650-3171-9
- The Simple Beauty of the Unexpected: A Natural Philosopher's Quest for Trout and the Meaning of Everything, ForeEdge (7 June 2016), ISBN 978-1-61168-441-4
- "How Much Can We Know? The reach of the scientific method is constrained by the limitations of our tools and the intrinsic impenetrability of some of nature's deepest questions", Scientific American, vol. 318, no. 6 (June 2018), pp. 72–73.
- Great Minds Don't Think Alike: Debates on Consciousness, Reality, Intelligence, Faith, Time, AI, Immortality, and the Human (editor), (February 2022), ISBN 9780231204118
- The Dawn of a Mindful Universe: A Manifesto for Humanity's Future, HarperOne (22 August 2023), ISBN 978-0063056879
- Co-written with Adam Frank and Evan Thompson, The Blind Spot: Why Science Cannot Ignore Human Experience, MIT Press (5 March 2024), ISBN 978-0-262-04880-4

== See also ==
- List of astronomers § M. Gleiser
