= Leroy Cronin =

British chemist

- FRSE FRSC
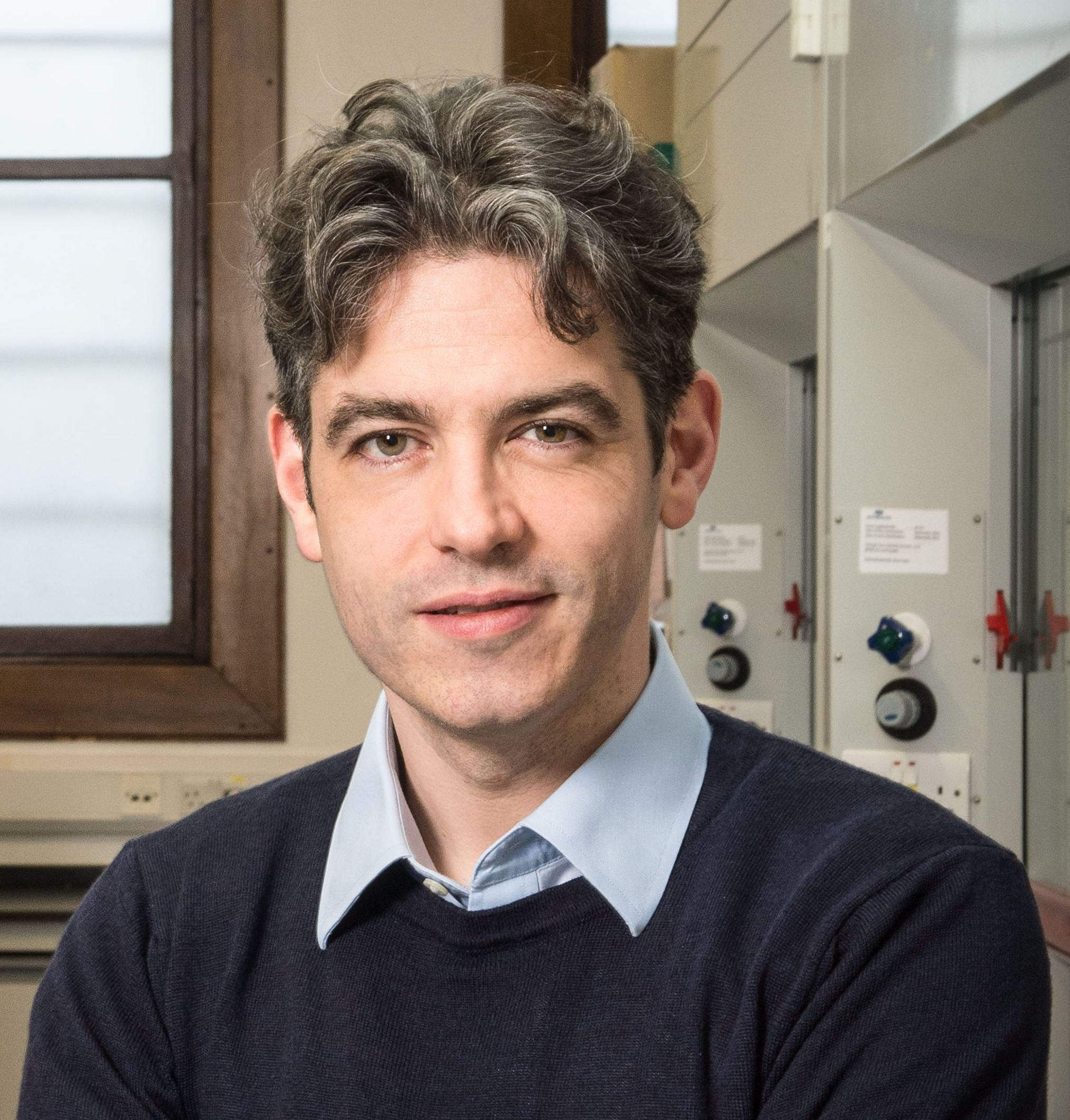
- Cronin in 2015
- Born: 1 June 1973 (age 53)
- Education: University of York
- Known for: Chemistry
- Awards: FRSE FRSC Philip Leverhulme Prize Corday–Morgan Prize; RSE BP Hutton Prize; Tilden Prize; Interdisciplinary Prize
- Scientific career
- Fields: Chemistry, Digital Chemistry, Assembly Theory, Nanoscience, Self Assembly, Systems chemistry, Complex Chemical Systems, Inorganic Biology, Supramolecular chemistry, Self-organization, 3D printing
- Workplaces: University of Glasgow; University of Birmingham; Research Institute for Electronic Science, University of Hokkaido; University of Bielefeld; University of Edinburgh
- Doctoral advisor: Paul. H. Walton

Leroy "Lee" Cronin FRSE FRSC (born 1 June 1973) is the Regius Chair of Chemistry in the School of Chemistry at the University of Glasgow. He was elected to the Fellowship of the Royal Society of Edinburgh, the Royal Society of Chemistry, and appointed to the Regius Chair of Chemistry in 2013. He was previously the Gardiner Chair, appointed April 2009.

== Biography ==
Cronin was awarded BSc (1994) and PhD (1997) from the University of York. From 1997 to 1999, he was a Leverhulme fellow at the University of Edinburgh working with Neil Robertson. From 1999 to 2000 he worked as an Alexander von Humboldt research fellow in the laboratory of Achim Mueller at the University of Bielefeld (1999–2000). In 2000, he joined the University of Birmingham as a lecturer in chemistry, and in 2002 he moved to a similar position at the University of Glasgow. In 2005, he was promoted to Reader at the University of Glasgow, EPSRC Advanced Fellow followed by promotion to Professor of Chemistry in 2006, and in 2009 became the Gardiner Professor. In 2013, he became the Regius Professor of Chemistry (Glasgow).

In 2012 Cronin was described to be designing robots using 3D printed-architectures to discover and design new chemicals including pharmaceuticals. By making a modular system he was able to build a programming language for chemistry named XDL. This was extended to ensure the "chemputer" was universal and this was demonstrated by reading the chemistry synthesis literature and converting it into executable chemical code. A spinoff company led by Cronin, called Chemify, was launched in 2019 and raised £33m in 2023.

In 2017 Cronin first published the concept of assembly theory which aims to quantify how complex a molecule is, considering how many steps it would take to build the molecule using the minimum number of steps to add together the various parts allowing reuse.

In 2022 Cronin was suspended by the Royal Society of Chemistry for three months for breaching their code of conduct, following an investigation of a complaint made by a third party.

== Awards and recognition ==
- 2007 Philip Leverhulme Prize by the Leverhulme Trust
- 2012 Royal Society of Chemistry Corday–Morgan medal
- 2014 recognised as one of the UK's top 10 Inspiring Scientists and Engineers (RISE) as well as being recognised as one of the top 100 UK practising Scientists by the UK Science Council.
- 2015 Royal Society of Edinburgh BP / Hutton Prize for Energy innovation. Royal Society of Chemistry Tilden Prize.
- 2018 American Chemical Society Inorganic Chemistry Lectureship Royal Society of Chemistry Interdisciplinary Prize for his work developing the field of digital chemistry
