= Speculative fiction =

Genre of fiction including science fiction, horror and fantasy

Speculative fiction is an umbrella genre of fiction that encompasses all the subgenres that depart from realism, or strictly imitating everyday reality, instead presenting fantastical, supernatural, futuristic, or other highly imaginative realms or beings.

This catch-all genre includes but is not limited to fantasy, science fiction, social science fiction, science fantasy, superhero, paranormal and supernatural horror, alternate history, slipstream, weird fiction, utopia, dystopia, and apocalyptic and post-apocalyptic fiction. In other words, the genre presents individuals, events, or places beyond the ordinary real world.

The term speculative fiction has been used for works of literature, film, television, drama, video games, radio, and hybrid media.

== Speculative versus realistic fiction ==
The umbrella genre of speculative fiction is characterized by a lesser degree of adherence to plausible depictions of individuals, events, or places, while the umbrella genre of realistic fiction (partly crossing over with literary realism) is characterized by a greater degree of adherence to such depictions. For instance, speculative fiction may depict an entirely imaginary universe or one in which the laws of nature do not strictly apply (often the subgenre of fantasy). Alternatively, the genre depicts actual historical moments, except that they have concluded in an entirely imaginary way or been followed by major imaginary events (i.e., the subgenre of alternative history). As another alternative, the genre depicts impossible technology or technology that defies current scientific understanding or capabilities (i.e., the subgenre of science fiction).

By contrast, realistic fiction involves a story whose basic setting is real and whose events could plausibly occur in the real world. One realistic fiction subgenre is historical fiction, which is centred around actual major events and time periods of the past. The attempt to make stories seem faithful to reality or to more objectively describe details and also the 19th-century artistic movement that vigorously promoted this approach is called "literary realism" and includes both fiction and non-fiction works.

=== Distinguishing science fiction from other speculative fiction ===
"Speculative fiction" is sometimes abbreviated as spec-fic, spec fic, specfic, S-F, SF, or sf. The last three abbreviations, however, are ambiguous since they have long been used to refer to science fiction (which lies within this general area of literature). The genre is sometimes known as the fantastic or fantastika; the latter term is attributed to science fiction scholar John Clute, who coined it in 2007 after the term for the genre in some Slavic languages.

The term speculative fiction has been used by some critics and writers who oppose a perceived limitation of science fiction: the requirement for a story to adhere to scientific principles. These people argue that speculative fiction better defines an expanded, open, imaginative type of fiction than does genre fiction, and the categories of fantasy, mystery, horror and science fiction. Harlan Ellison used the term to avoid being classified as a science fiction writer. Ellison, a fervent proponent of writers embracing more literary and modernist directions, broke out of genre conventions to push the boundaries of speculative fiction.

The term suppositional fiction is sometimes used as a subcategory designating fiction in which characters and stories are constrained by an internally consistent world, but not necessarily one defined by any particular genre.

== History ==
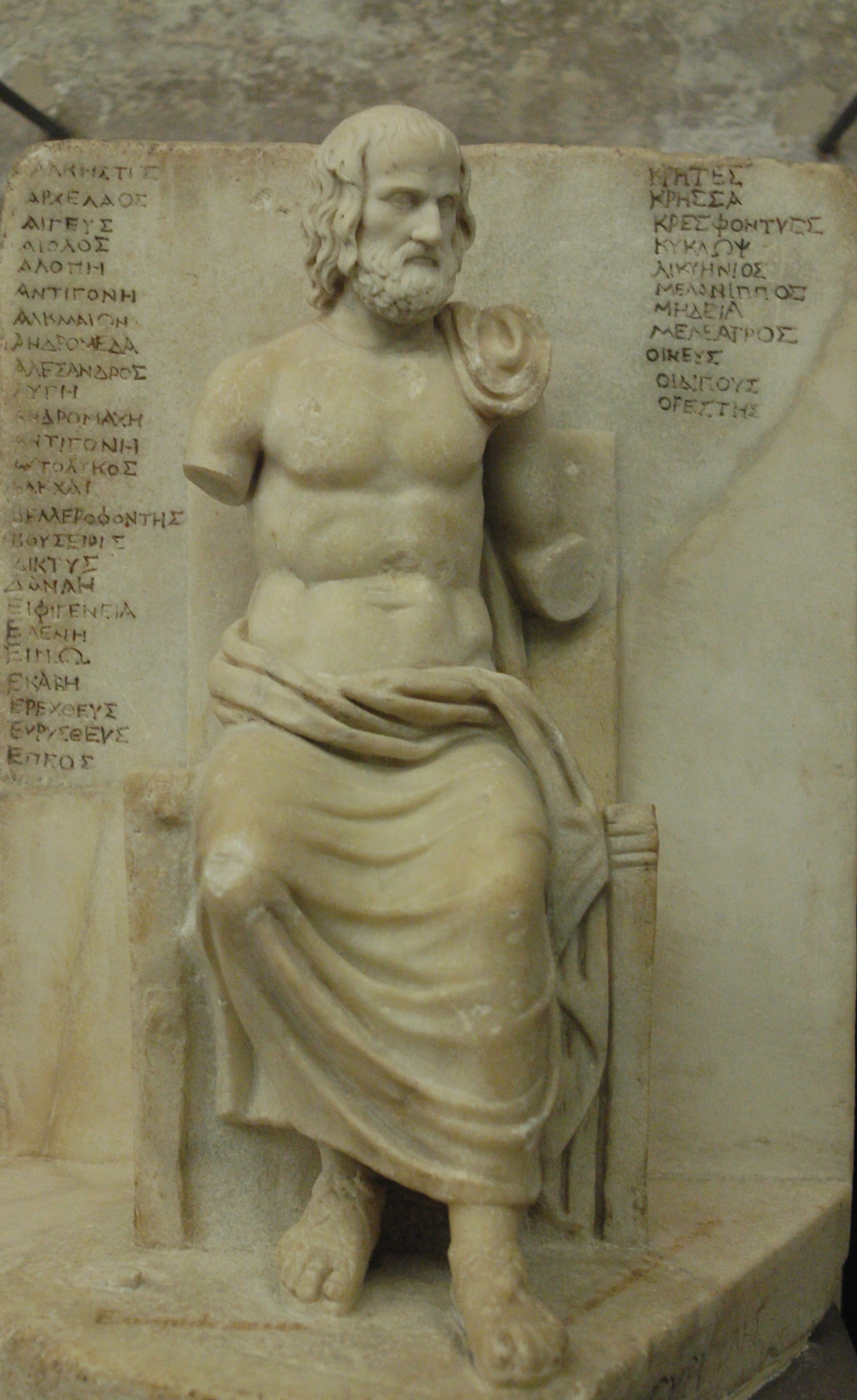
Euripides

Speculative fiction as a category ranges from ancient works to paradigm-changing and neotraditional works of the 21st century. Characteristics of speculative fiction have been recognized in older works whose authors' intentions are now known or in the social contexts of the stories that they tell. An example is the ancient Greek dramatist, Euripides (c. 480 – c. 406 BCE), whose play Medea seems to have offended Athenian audiences; in this play, he speculated that the titular sorceress Medea killed her own children, as opposed to their being killed by other Corinthians after her departure.

In historiography, what is now called speculative fiction has previously been termed historical invention, historical fiction, and similar names. These terms have been extensively applied in literary criticism to the works of William Shakespeare. For example, in A Midsummer Night's Dream, he places several characters from different locations and times into the Fairyland of the fictional Merovingian Germanic sovereign Oberon; these characters include the Athenian Duke Theseus, the Amazonian Queen Hippolyta, the English fairy Puck, and the Roman god Cupid.

In mythography, the concept of speculative fiction has been termed mythopoesis or mythopoeia. This process involves the creative design and development of lore and mythology for works of fiction. The term's definition comes from use by J. R. R. Tolkien; his series of novels, The Lord of the Rings, shows an application of the process. Themes common in mythopoeia, such as the supernatural, alternate history, and sexuality, continue to be explored in works produced in modern speculative fiction.

Speculative fiction in the general sense of hypothetical history, explanation, or ahistorical storytelling has been attributed to authors in ostensibly non-fiction modes since Herodotus of Halicarnassus (fl. 5th century BCE) with his Histories; it was already both created and edited out by early encyclopedic writers such Sima Qian (c. 145 or 135 BCE–86 BCE), author of Shiji.

Those examples highlight a caveat: many works that are now viewed as speculative fiction long predated the labelling of the genre. In the broadest sense, the genre's concept does two things: it captures both conscious and unconscious aspects of human psychology in making sense of the world, and it responds to the world by creating imaginative, inventive, and artistic expressions. Such expressions can contribute to practical societal progress through interpersonal influences; social and cultural movements; scientific research and advances; and the philosophy of science.

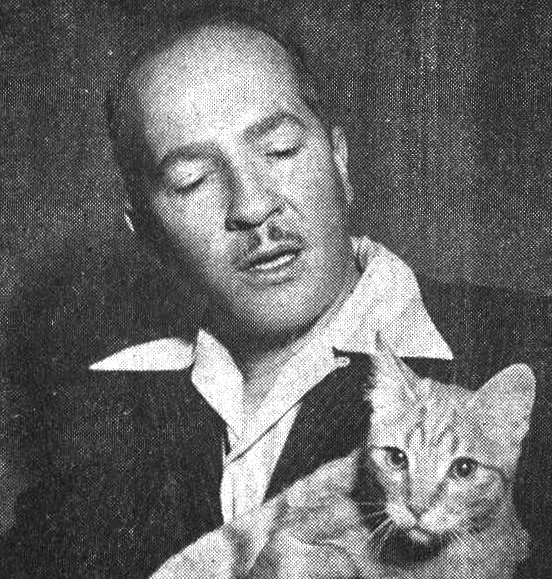
Robert Heinlein c. 1953

In English-language usage in arts and literature since the mid 20th century, the term speculative fiction has often been attributed to Robert A. Heinlein, who first used it in an editorial in The Saturday Evening Post (on 8 February 1947). In the article, Heinlein used Speculative Fiction as a synonym for science fiction; in a later article, he stated explicitly that his use of the term excluded fantasy. Although Heinlein may have invented the term independently, earlier citations exist. An article in Lippincott's Monthly Magazine in 1889 used the term in reference to Edward Bellamy's novel Looking Backward: 2000–1887 and other works; and an article in the May 1900 issue of The Bookman mentioned that John Uri Lloyd's novel Etidorhpa, or, The End of the Earth had "created a great deal of discussion among people interested in speculative fiction". A variant of this term is speculative literature.

The use of the term speculative fiction to express dissatisfaction with traditional or establishment science fiction was popularized in the 1960s and early 1970s by Judith Merril, as well as other writers and editors connected with the New Wave movement. However, this use of the term became less popular toward the mid-1970s.

During the 2000s, the term speculative fiction came into wider use as a convenient way to describe a set of genres. However, some writers (such as Margaret Atwood) still distinguish "speculative fiction" as a specifically "no Martians" type of science fiction, "about things that really could happen".

The term speculative fiction is also used to describe genres combined into a single narrative or fictional world, such as "science fiction, horror, fantasy...[and]...mystery".

In documenting this broad genre, the Internet Speculative Fiction Database includes a list of different subtypes.

According to publisher statistics, men outnumber women about two to one among English-language speculative fiction writers who seek professional publication. However, the percentages vary considerably by genre, with women outnumbering men in the areas of urban fantasy, paranormal romance and young adult fiction.

Academic journals that publish essays on speculative fiction include Extrapolation and Foundation.

== Genres ==
Speculative fiction may include elements from one or more of the following genres:

Subgenres of speculative fiction
Name	Description	Examples
Fantasy	Includes elements and beings originating from or inspired by traditional stories, such as mythical creatures (dragons, elves, dwarves, fairies, and giants), magic, witchcraft, and potions.	The Lord of the Rings, Conan the Barbarian, Elric of Melniboné, Dungeons and Dragons, The Legend of Zelda, A Song of Ice and Fire, Magic: The Gathering, Warcraft, The Witcher, Final Fantasy, One Piece, Hunter × Hunter, Avatar: The Last Airbender
Science fiction	Features technologies and other elements that do not actually exist, but may be imagined as being created or discovered in the future through scientific advancement, such as advanced robots, interstellar travel, aliens, time travel, mutants and cyborgs. Many science fiction stories are set in the future.	Frankenstein, Halo, The Time Machine, Cyberpunk 2077, Mass Effect, 2001: A Space Odyssey, Terminator, Doctor Who, Stranger in a Strange Land, Blade Runner, The Matrix, The Expanse, Transformers, The Three-Body Problem, Stargate, Babylon 5, Andromeda, Star Trek, Patternist series, Lilith's Brood
Social science fiction	Focuses on speculation about society and human behaviour, often with an anthropological lens. Social science fiction may explore the impact of science and technology on society, or may explore plausible future evolutions of society.	The Time Machine, Gulliver's Travels, Thomas Moore's Utopia, Brave New World, Nineteen Eighty-Four, Fahrenheit 451, The Left Hand of Darkness, The Dispossessed, Stranger in a Strange Land, the Mars Trilogy, The Hunger Games
Science fantasy	Hybrid genre that draws on or combines tropes and elements from both science fiction and fantasy.	Star Wars, Dune, Barsoom, Space Dandy, Super Mario, ThunderCats, Masters of the Universe, Warhammer 40,000, Avatar, Guilty Gear
Superhero	Centers on superheroes (i.e., heroes with extraordinary abilities or powers) and their fight against evil forces such as supervillains. Typically incorporates elements of science fiction or fantasy, and may be a subgenre of these.	DC Universe, Marvel Universe, Kamen Rider, My Hero Academia, Super Sentai, Metal Heroes
Space Western	Hybrid genre that draws on or combines tropes and elements from both science fiction and the Western genre.	The Mandalorian, BraveStarr, Firefly, Outlaw Star, Space Dandy, Trigun, Bucky O'Hare, Cowboy Bebop, ThunderCats, Masters of the Universe, Buck Rogers, Dan Dare, Flash Gordon, Duck Dodgers
Weird West	Also known as Weird Western—the hybrid genres of fantasy Western, horror Western and science fiction Western, combining elements of the Western genre with those of fantasy, horror and science fiction.	Jonah Hex, Dead in the West, The Dark Tower, Westworld, Bone Tomahawk, Cowboys & Aliens, Undead Nightmare, Hard West
Supernatural	Similar to horror and fantasy, this genre overlaps with Paranormal Romance, Contemporary Fantasy, Urban Fantasy, Occult Detective Fiction, and Paranormal Fiction. It exploits or requires plot devices or themes that often contradict commonplace, materialist assumptions about the natural world.	The Castle of Otranto, Buffy the Vampire Slayer, Angel, Big Wolf on Campus, Teen Wolf, Harry Potter, Percy Jackson & the Olympians, Stranger Things, The X-Files, Paranormal Activity, Dark, Fallen, The Vampire Diaries, Charmed, The Others, The Gift, The Skeleton Key, SCP Foundation, Fledgling
Horror	Focuses on stories that inspire fear. Villains may be either supernatural entities, such as monsters, vampires, ghosts and demons, or mundane people, such as psychopathic and cruel murderers. Often features violence and death.	Dracula, The Exorcist, Cthulhu Mythos, A Nightmare on Elm Street, Us, Books of Blood, The Hellbound Heart, Resident Evil, The Blair Witch Project
Utopian	Takes place in a highly desirable society, often presented as advanced, happy, intelligent, or even perfect and problem-free.	Island, Ecotopia, 17776
Dystopian	Takes place in a highly undesirable society, often troubled by strict control, violence, chaos, brainwashing, or other negative elements.	Neon Genesis Evangelion, 1984, Brazil, The Handmaid's Tale, A Clockwork Orange, The Hunger Games, Judge Dredd
Alternate history	Focuses on historical events as if they had occurred differently, and the resulting implications for the present.	The Man in the High Castle, The Last Starship from Earth, Inglourious Basterds, The Guns of the South, Fatherland, The Years of Rice and Salt, Wolfenstein
Apocalyptic	Takes place before and during a global catastrophe, typically a large-scale pandemic, natural disaster, or nuclear holocaust.	Godzilla, On the Beach, Threads, The Day After Tomorrow, Bird Box, 2012, Attack on Titan, War of the Worlds, World War Z, Parable of the Sower, Parable of the Talents
Post-apocalyptic	Focuses on groups of survivors after global disasters.	Planet of the Apes, The Stand, Mad Max, The Walking Dead, Waterworld, Fallout, Metroid Prime, Metro 2033, The Last Of Us, Nausicaä of the Valley of the Wind, Wasteland, Z213: Exit
Speculative evolution	Focuses on a hypothetical alternative or future evolution of humans and/or animals.	Expedition, After Man: A Zoology of the Future, All Tomorrows, The New Dinosaurs: An Alternative Evolution, Man After Man: An Anthropology of the Future, Snaiad
Xenofiction	Follows the perspectives of non-human characters, focusing on the way their species impacts their lifestyle and thoughts.	Watership Down, The Plague Dogs, The Call of the Wild, Warriors, Guardians of Ga'Hoole

== See also ==
- Biblical speculative fiction
- Comic genres
- Genre fiction
- List of genres
- Megatext
- Speculative art
- Speculative fiction by writers of color
- Speculative poetry
- Weird fiction
