= Greenworld =

2010 novel by Dougal Dixon

- Japanese cover of the First Edition of the first volume. The cover depicts three organisms native to Greenworld in the lower left; the flying "Fallicon" and a "Strida" (an animal used similarly to horses by the human colonizers) carrying a "Sitta" on its back.
- Author: Dougal Dixon
- Language: Japanese
- Genre: Speculative evolution Science fiction
- Publisher: Diamond
- Publication date: 2010 (Japan, in two volumes)
- Publication place: Japan
- Media type: Print (hardback)
- Pages: 337 (Volume 1); 365 (Volume 2)
- ISBN: 978-4478860588 (Volume 1); 978-4478012512 (Volume 2)

Greenworld (Japanese: グリーンワールド Hepburn: Gurīn wārudo) is a 2010 speculative evolution and science fiction book written by Scottish geologist and paleontologist Dougal Dixon and primarily illustrated by Dixon himself, alongside a few images by other artists. Greenworld features a fictional alien planet of the same name and a diverse biosphere of alien organisms. Greenworld has so far only been published in Japan, where it was released in two volumes.

The premise of Greenworld follows human colonisation of the alien planet over the course of a thousand years, chronicling mankind's disastrous impact on Greenworld's ecosystems, similar to how humans today are impacting Earth and its life. Greenworld and its creatures were originally designed by Dixon as a design exercise for his local science fiction group and the planet and its organisms first appeared in a 1992 episode of the Channel 4 series Equinox, followed by appearances in various other media, including the 1997 programme Natural History of an Alien.

Greenworld's premise is similar to, and repurposed from, Dixon's original idea for his book Man After Man (1990), which would have involved humans time-travelling 50 million years into the future to colonize biosphere of the future he had developed for After Man (1981). The version of Man After Man that was eventually published was considerably different from Dixon's original concept.

== Summary ==
Greenworld is a hypothetical Earth-like exoplanet with a diverse and thriving biosphere. All animal-analogous organisms on Greenworld are descended from a radially symmetrical six-legged starfish-like animal. Animals on Greenworld secondarily developed bilateral symmetry (which is what is seen in most animals on Earth), developing into two major groups; "sulcosyms" in which the plane of symmetry lies between the legs (meaning they have three pairs of limbs) and "brachiosyms" in which the plane of symmetry has led to the formation of one "arm" at each of its ends (meaning two pairs of limbs and two unpaired limbs, one at the front and one at the back).

In the book, humanity discovers Greenworld just as Earth finally collapses under the pressure of mankind's impact and a generation ship with ten thousand people is sent to colonize the planet. Greenworld then explores the first thousand years of human colonisation on the planet through following some key families of settlers. Over the course of this timespan, every ecological catastrophe caused by humans on Earth is repeated on Greenworld. The book is divided into several shorter chapters, each telling a short story and featuring illustrations of the local animals and their interactions and relations to humans. Illustrations also include "excerpts" of advertisements, science papers, field guides and recipes. By the end of the book, Greenworld and its ecosystems are in ruins, mankind having caused a mass extinction event through their actions on the planet.

== Development ==
The fictional planet and biosphere featured in Greenworld was originally created as a design exercise by Dixon for his local science fiction group, basing it on the same biochemical processes behind the evolution of life on Earth. Before Dixon put the whole concept together as a cohesive book, parts of the project appeared in different media in which Dixon featured. In this capacity, Greenworld first appeared in the Channel 4 programme E.T, Please call Earth (part of the series Equinox) in 1992, followed by appearances in BBC's It'll Never Work?, The Radio Times and in BBC Focus in 1993 and it was one of many hypothetical alien worlds by different scientists featured on the BBC2/Discovery Channel programme Natural History of an Alien in 1997.

Following the success of his previous speculative evolution books After Man (1981) and The New Dinosaurs (1988), Dixon worked on a new project dubbed Man After Man which was to involve mankind avoiding catastrophes such as overpopulation and mass starvation by inventing time travel and moving 50 million years in the future to re-establish civilization. As such Man After Man would have been set in the same world as After Man and would have focused on the man-made catastrophes destroying the ecosystems Dixon had established in the previous book. The final version of Man After Man, published as a book in 1990, was instead focused on future climate change through the eyes of future human descendants genetically engineered to adapt to it and was a project Dixon was reluctant to be involved in. Dixon's original concept for Man After Man, the destruction of an established ecosystem by mankind, was instead eventually used for Greenworld, with Dixon applying it to the fictional alien world which he had created.

The majority of the illustrations in Greenworld were done by Dixon himself, though some images were also produced by other artists such as Julius T. Csotonyi and Margaret Walty. Although Greenworld has so far only been published in Japan, Dixon has expressed interest in getting an English-language version published. In the spring of 2021, the fictional biosphere of Greenworld was highlighted among other science fiction works at the exhibition "Interspecies Futures" at the Center for Book Arts in New York.
