= Dougal Dixon =

Scottish geologist and paleontologist (born 1947)

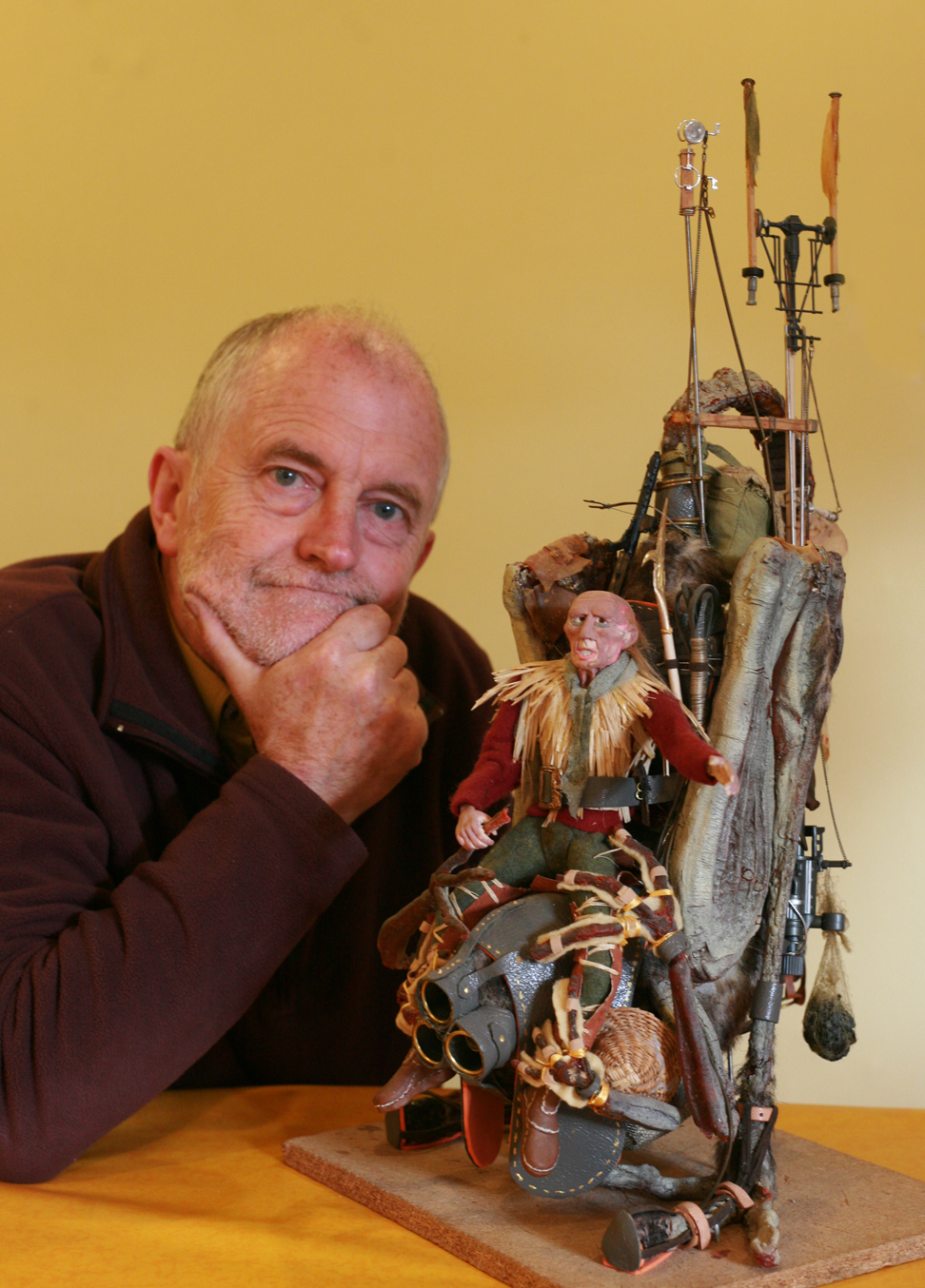
- Dougal Dixon in 2009 with a model of a "Strida", one of the creatures featured in his 2010 book Greenworld
- Born: 1 March 1947 (age 79); Dumfries, Scotland
- Citizenship: United Kingdom
- Education: University of St Andrews
- Known for: After Man; Foundation of the speculative evolution movement Palaeontology and geology books
- Spouse: Jean Dixon (m. 1971)
- Children: 2
- Awards: See text
- Scientific career
- Fields: Geology; Palaeontology
- Website: www.dougal-dixon.co.uk

Dougal Dixon (born 1 March 1947) is a Scottish geologist, palaeontologist, educator and author. Dixon has written well over a hundred books on geology and palaeontology, many of them for children, which have been credited with attracting many to the study of the prehistoric animals. Because of his work as a prolific science writer, he has also served as a consultant on dinosaur programmes.

Dixon is most famous for his 1980/90s trilogy of speculative evolution books: After Man (1981), The New Dinosaurs (1988) and Man After Man (1990). These books use imagined future and alternate animals to explain various natural processes, including evolution, natural selection, zoogeography and climate change.

== Early life and education ==
Dixon was born in Dumfries on 1 March 1947 to parents Thomas Bell Dixon and Margaret Ann Hurst. He had an older brother, John Edward, who died in 1942 at the age of six. Dixon spent most of his younger years in the Scottish borderlands. He credits the beginning of his writing career as being spawned from his love of creating stories, usually in the form of comic strips, as a child. His comic strips were typically science fiction-themed or otherwise futuristic, and frequently incorporated strange creatures. Dixon has had a special interest in evolution and fossils since his youth.

Dixon was first introduced to dinosaurs at the age of five, when he saw one in a comic book. Having never seen dinosaurs before, he took showed the image to his father, who in turn showed Dixon an old natural history book with pictures of ancient animals and fossils. Dixon has since credited this moment as igniting his interest for prehistoric creatures and natural history.

In 1970, Dixon graduated from the University of St Andrews with a Bachelor of Science, also with a degree in geology and teaching aids, and in 1972, he graduated with a Master of Science, having studied geology and palaeontology. Dixon's research thesis focused on palaeogeography, tracing the different landscapes of the British Isles throughout their geological history.

== Career ==
Dixon's first experiences with publishing came when he worked as the in-house geological consultant for the publishing company Mitchell/Beazley Ltd. in London from 1973 to 1978. From 1978 to 1980 he worked as a book editor for Blandford Press in Dorset, England and from 1980 onwards he has worked as a freelance editor and writer. From 1976 to 1978 Dixon also worked as a part-time tutor, teaching geology and palaeontology, at the Open University. He also did teaching work from 1993 to 2005, sponsored by the publishing company Boyds Mills Press as a visiting lecturer at elementary schools in the United States, giving presentations about dinosaurs.

Dixon was a member of the board of governors of the Sandford First School in Wareham, Dorset from 1985 to 1987, and also a chairman of the Parent-Teachers Association at the Sandford Middle School, also located in Wareham, from 1985 to 1989.

Dixon has also done various other types of work. From 1981 to 1990, he worked as a civilian instructor for the Air Training Corps, a British volunteer-military youth organisation. He has also worked as a practical geologist. In 1995, he partook in an Open University/Earthwatch expedition to Askja Caldera, Iceland, and in 1987, Dixon was one of the excavators at a Jurassic-aged dinosaur-rich fossil site in Durlston, Dorset. Dixon was also involved in excavations of stegosaurian fossils in Montana from 2004 to 2008. Dixon has also participated in excavations in the United Kingdom and Ireland.

== Writing ==
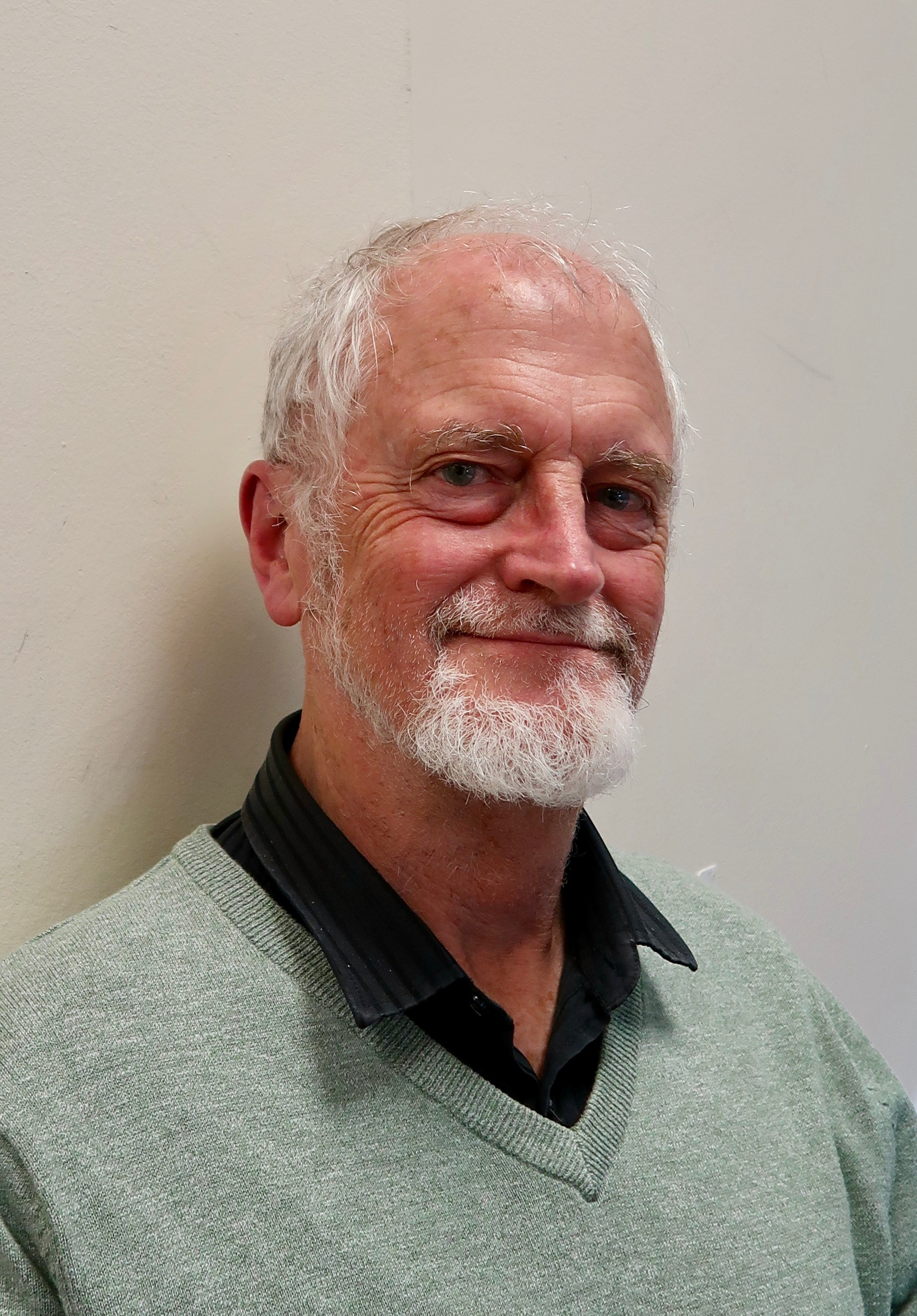
Dougal Dixon in 2019

=== Palaeontology and geology ===
Dixon today works as a full-time author and book editor and has written well over a hundred books. (Note: As of 2021, Dixon's own website lists 180 published titles.) The majority of Dixon's books are encyclopaedias or children's books concerning palaeontology or geology. Through writing books on the subject on several different levels and adapting the material accordingly, reviewers have credited Dixon with attracting many to the study of dinosaurs and many of his books have been praised by critics. Some of his books, such as Hunting the Dinosaurs and Other Prehistoric Animals (1987), Be a Dinosaur Detective (1988), and Dougal Dixon's Dinosaurs (1993), have long been recommended inclusions in school libraries and children's curricula. Dougal Dixon's Dinosaurs features Dixon's own artwork, an early example of a palaeontology book written and illustrated by the same person.

Dixon himself considers his palaeontology and geology books, due to inspiring others to take an active interest in these fields, to be his greatest contribution to science. He has also noted that the speed in which new palaeontology discoveries are made today often render portions of his books outdated before they are even published.

As a result of his books, Dixon is recognised as an authority on dinosaurs and has worked as a consultant and animator on dinosaur programmes. He has also hosted a Japanese programme on evolution, during which he travelled across the world, visiting, among other locations, the Galápagos Islands and the Serengeti. One of Dixon's more novel dinosaur books which has garnered him some attention is Time Exposure (1984), in which he collaborated with the wildlife photographer Jane Burton to portray extinct animals in life-like photographs. In addition to writing his own books, Dixon has also contributed to several collaborative encyclopaedias and dictionaries.

=== Speculative evolution ===
Dixon is most well-known for his illustrated books within the field of speculative evolution, particularly his three books sometimes dubbed the 'After trilogy': After Man (1981), The New Dinosaurs (1988) and Man After Man (1990). These books contain elaborate visions of plausible future and alternate ecosystems. Reviews were highly positive, and Dixon went on publicity tours in both Britain and the United States. Through the After trilogy, Dixon is generally considered to be the founder of the modern speculative evolution movement, an artistic and scientific movement focused on speculative paths in the evolution of life. His ideas have been repurposed or used as inspirations for numerous similar projects, both in print and on the internet, and have in some cases spawned adaptations and exhibitions.

Dixon has also been involved in further projects since the After trilogy. In 1996, he served as the designer for the creatures of the Japanese IMAX film Krakken: Adventure of Future Ocean, which imagined future ocean creatures. In 1998, Dixon was one of the scientists featured on the programme Natural History of an Alien, where several hypothesised alien ecosystems were explored. Dixon's imagined world, "Greenworld", was later utilised in his fourth personal speculative evolution book, Greenworld (2010). Dixon served as a consultant and creature designer for the miniseries The Future is Wild (2002) and also co-authored its companion book with the series producer Joanna Adams. Dixon also contributed to the 2020 Netflix series Alien Worlds.

Dixon uses his speculative evolution books to explain various natural processes through fictitious examples: After Man explores evolution and natural selection through a fictional future ecosystem, The New Dinosaurs explores zoogeography through a fictional alternate world where the Cretaceous–Paleogene extinction event never happened, Man After Man explores climate change through the eyes of future human descendants engineered to adapt to it, and Greenworld explores the relationship between humans and the natural environment through a fictional extraterrestrial biosphere. Dixon has consequently described himself as a "populariser", who presents the scientific information in new and unusual forms.

The inspiration for Dixon's interest in speculative biology was according to himself "a mixture of a fascination for science and an appreciation of fantasy and imagination". In particular, he also credits H. G. Wells' The Time Machine as inspiring him as a child to invent future animals descended from modern ones. In the 1960s and 1970s, conservationist movements caused the idea to periodically resurface, eventually culminating in the publication of After Man in 1981. The success of After Man then inspired his further works in the genre.

== Personal life ==
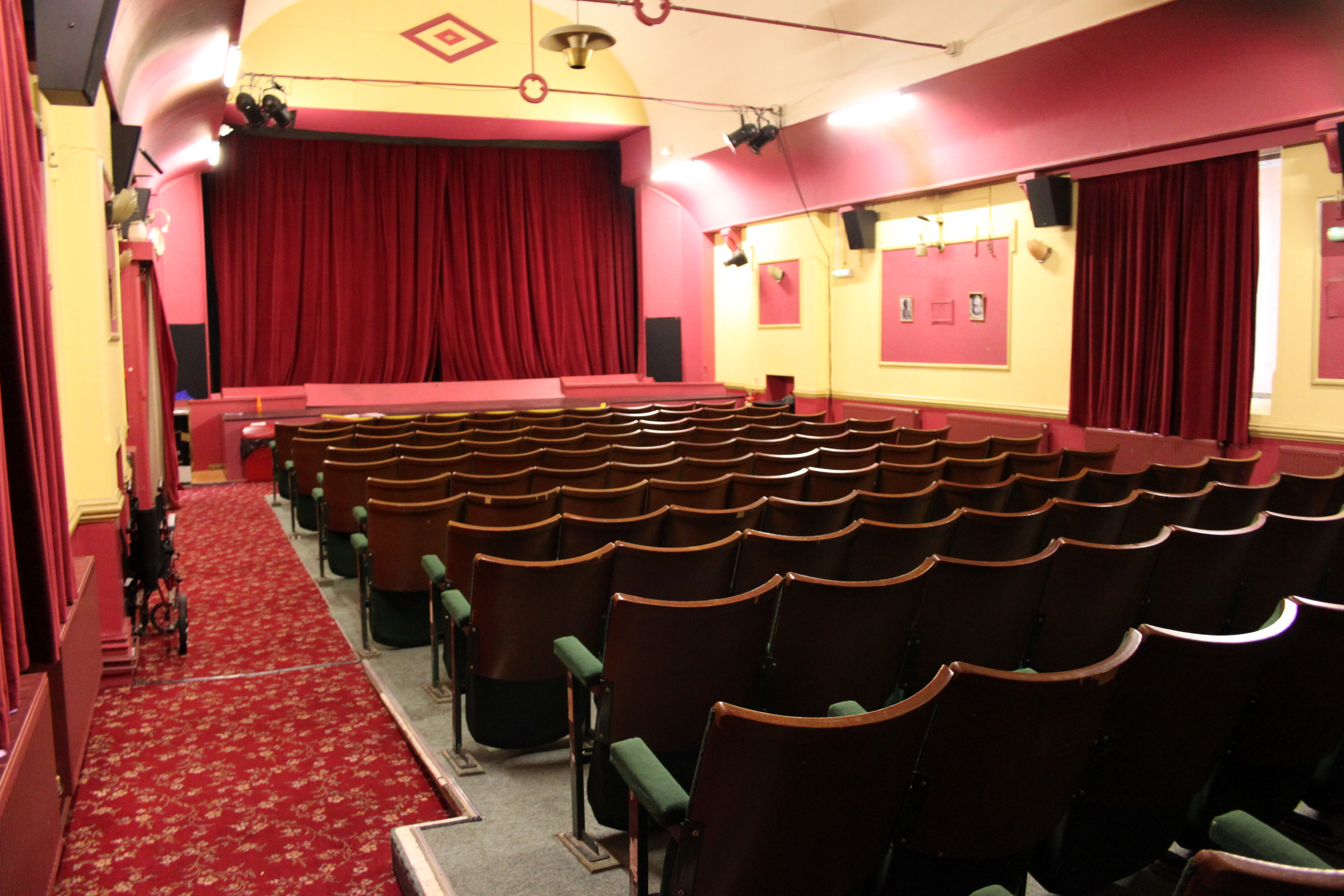
The Rex Cinema in Wareham

Dixon married his wife Jean Mary Young on 3 April 1971. They live together in Wareham in Dorset and have two children: Gavin (born 1975) and Lindsay (born 1980), as well as three grandchildren. In Wareham, Dixon is also the director, operations manager and chief projectionist of the local movie theatre, the Rex Cinema, and he has created claymation stop-motion advertisements for local businesses, as well as animated short films, that screen before the feature films. Dixon's hobbies also include painting and sculpting.

Dixon is a science fiction enthusiast and has attended several conventions, often speaking about the veracity, in terms of evolution and ecology, of alien creatures in science fiction. Dixon has stated that he mostly reads science fiction stories from the "golden age", by writers such as Brian Aldiss, Arthur C. Clarke, Robert Silverberg and Clifford D. Simak.

Dixon has stated that he does not believe in a god "as far as evolution is concerned".

== Awards ==
- 1993 – Helen Roney Sattler Award, for Dougal Dixon's Dinosaurs.
- 1993 – Distinguished Achievement Award for Excellence in Educational Journalism, for Dougal Dixon's Dinosaurs. Granted by the Educational Press Association of America.
- 1994 – Outstanding Science Trade Book Award, for Dougal Dixon's Dinosaurs. Granted by the Children's Book Council.
- 1996 – Times Educational Supplement Primary Schoolbook Award, for Discovery Dinosaurs.
- 2019 – Children's Choice Award, for When the Whales Walked. Granted by the School Library Association.

=== Nominations ===
- 1982 – Hugo Award for Best Related Work nomination, for After Man.
- 1991 – Rhone Poulenc Science Book Prize nomination, for The Big Book of Prehistoric Life.
