= Man After Man =

Book by Dougal Dixon

Man After Man An Anthropology of the Future
- First Edition cover. The cover depicts "Jimez Smoot's descendant", a spacefaring human descendant living five million years in the future.
- Author: Dougal Dixon
- Language: English
- Genre: Speculative evolution Science fiction
- Publisher: Blandford Press (UK); St. Martin's Press (US)
- Publication date: 1990
- Publication place: United Kingdom
- Media type: Print (hardback and paperback)
- Pages: 128
- ISBN: 978-0713720716

Man After Man: An Anthropology of the Future is a 1990 speculative evolution and science fiction book written by Scottish geologist and palaeontologist Dougal Dixon and illustrated by Philip Hood. The book also features a foreword by Brian Aldiss. Man After Man explores a hypothetical future path of human evolution set from 200 years in the future to 5 million years in the future, with several future human species evolving through genetic engineering and natural means through the course of the book.

Man After Man is Dixon's third work on speculative evolution, following After Man (1981) and The New Dinosaurs (1988). Unlike the previous two books, which were written much like field guides, the focus of Man After Man lies much on the individual perspectives of future human individuals of various species. Man After Man, like its predecessors, uses its fictional setting to explore and explain real natural processes, in this case climate change through the eyes of the various human descendants in the book, who have been engineered specifically to adapt to it.

Reviews of Man After Man were generally positive, but more mixed than the previous books and criticised its scientific basis to a greater extent than that of its predecessors. Dixon himself is not fond of the book, having referred to it as a "disaster of a project". During writing, the book had changed considerably from its initial concept, which Dixon instead repurposed for his later book Greenworld (2010).

== Summary ==
Man After Man explores an imaginary future evolutionary path of humanity, from 200 years in the future to five million years in the future. It contains several technological, social and biological concepts, most prominently genetic engineering but also parasitism, slavery, and elective surgery. As a result of mankind's technological prowess, evolution is accelerated, producing several species with varying intraspecific relations, many of them unrecognizable as humans.

Instead of the field guide-like format of Dixon's previous books, After Man (1981) and The New Dinosaurs (1988), and instead of the conventional narrative style of most science fiction works, the book is told through short stories, isolated sequences of dramatic events in the lives of select individuals of the future human species imagined by Dixon. The genetically engineered humans of the future, in total numbering about 40 species through the book, occur in several different and diverse forms, with genetically engineered forms first being slave races created to survive underwater and in space without the need of protective gear and suits, described as the "ultimate triumphs of the genetic engineer".

Eventually, modern humanity dies out during a reversal of the poles, leaving the engineered human species to their own devices. As they were bred to approximate non-human animals, the lives of most human descendants revolve around gathering food and surviving the harsh conditions of nature. Eventually, as the creatures start to rediscover technology and civilization, they are visited by the descendants of the humans who fled the planet for space, millions of years ago, unaware that they had arrived at the homeworld of their ancestors. The visitors enslave the various earthling species, using genetic engineering to turn them into working animals and livestock. Having plundered the planet's resources, they eventually leave, leaving Earth uninhabitable and with the vast majority of human species rendered extinct. In the end, what remains of humanity is a species of aquatic human that lives in the depths of the ocean. The book ends on a relatively hopeful note, with the text establishing that someday the last remnants of humanity may evolve to meet the radically altered conditions of the barren surface "if they can change enough."

== Development ==
Dixon's previous speculative evolution book projects, After Man (1981) and The New Dinosaurs (1988), used fictional examples to exemplify real-life factual natural processes. After Man focuses on the processes within evolution and projects them into a hypothetical future scenario set 50 million years after the extinction of mankind, where various hypothetical future animal species are used to explain the concepts within evolution. The New Dinosaurs, meanwhile, focuses on the science of zoogeography, using fictional species in a world where the Cretaceous-Paleogene extinction event never happened to explain the process.

Man After Man follows in the same tradition, though the process to be explained changed during production of the book. Initially, Man After Man was intended to be about mankind avoiding catastrophes such as overpopulation and mass starvation by inventing time travel and moving 50 million years into the future to re-establish civilization. This original Man After Man would have been set in the same world as After Man and would have focused on man-made catastrophes destroying the ecosystem established in the previous book. Dixon was reluctant to be involved in the final version of the project, which instead focused on changing climate conditions through the eyes of future human species engineered to adapt to them, and has in subsequent interviews referred to it as a "disaster of a project". Man After Man is the only one of Dixon's speculative evolution works not featured on his website.

The original Man After Man concept, mankind destroying an established ecosystem, was later used by Dixon for another project where mankind colonized an alien planet with a complex and unique ecosystem. This project, published as the book Greenworld in 2010 (though so far only released in Japan), follows human colonization of the planet Greenworld over the course of a thousand years, showing how mankind affects its ecosystem.

== Reception ==
Like its predecessors After Man and The New Dinosaurs, Man After Man received generally positive reviews, though the science of the book was criticised in a greater extent than that featured in the preceding works. Writing for the Los Angeles Times, reviewer John Wilkes likened the future explored within Man After Man to the world of the film Blade Runner (1982) in its grim depictions of "technological progress decaying into human viciousness". Wilkes praised the introductionary chapters of the book, particularly the "easy-to-grasp and clearly illustrated" chapter on genetics. The various future human species were referred to by Wilkes as "truly wondrous" but "miserable". Wilkes also praised the "striking" illustrations by Philip Hood, particularly that of the "vacuumorph", though noted that some of his artwork was somewhat anatomically questionable and that some aspects of the book's science and technology "raised questions too involved to introduce here". He concluded that the greatest strength of the work was its ability to "compel empathy with such strange creatures".

Writing for the magazine The Skeptic, British critic and author David Langford stated that the book was a "superior coffee-table production", but found it "illuminating and fun" rather than realistic. In particular, Langford questioned the scattered usages of the term "telepathy" and the genetic engineering of humans capable of life in space and underwater without suits when suits would surely be more economical and avoid creating slave races dependent on high technology to survive. He found the most questionable decision to be the repopulation of Earth's ecosystem by human species engineered to be unintelligent, though noted that "the initial premise once accepted, this is good, striking stuff".

The British palaeontologist Henry Gee gave Man After Man a negative review in Nature. Gee found the book to be a "highly improbable mess" and criticised Dixon for "skirt[ing] over the ethics" of the different societal developments explored. He also thought the book read more like the synopsis for a science fiction novel than a scientific work and found the illustrations to be "lumpen and adolescent". He further noted that he found the work to be much inferior to After Man and The New Dinosaurs and that the application of the same format, with invented Latin nomenclature for the various human species, in Man After Man was "completely ridiculous".

=== Legacy ===
George Thomas Kurian and Graham T. T. Molitor listed both After Man and Man After Man as among the hundred most influential books on the future in their Encyclopedia of the Future (1996). Man After Man is often characterised as "dystopian", featuring a "freak show of genetic engineering", and as feeling more like science fiction than science, in contrast to After Man and The New Dinosaurs. Some of the illustrations in Man After Man have been turned into internet memes; particularly widespread is an illustration depicting a "woodland-dweller" attacking a "tundra-dweller", with the added text "Season's Greetings".

Some researchers, such as the anthropologist Matthew Wolf-Meyer, have described Man After Man's vision of the future as nihilistic. Wolf-Meyer assessed Man After Man in 2019 as "humanity’s ultimate humiliation in the face of the world they had created". In 2001, William Leiss described the illustrations in Man After Man as "quite striking" and as "[providing] much food for reflection".

== See also ==
- Transhuman
- Posthuman
- Last and First Men (1930) by Olaf Stapledon – a book which similarly explores future humans and their descendants
- All Tomorrows (2006) by C. M. Kosemen – another book which similarly explores future humans and their descendants
