= The Future Is Wild =

2002 television miniseries

- Official logo of The Future Is Wild
- Genre: Speculative evolution Nature documentary
- Created by: Joanna Adams
- Written by: Victoria Coules
- Directed by: Pierre de Lespinois
- Narrated by: Christian Rodska (UK/Europe); Tim White (US, Discovery Channel)
- Composers: Nicholas Hooper; Paul Pritchard
- Countries of origin: United Kingdom; United States
- No. of episodes: 13

Production
- Executive producers: Joanna Adams; Daniela Bagliani; Walter Köhler; Ruth Omphalius; Dawn Sinsel; Emanuela Spinetta
- Producers: Steve Nicholls; Paul Reddish; Jeremy Cadle; Clare Dornan
- Running time: 20–25 minutes

Original release
- Network: Animal Planet
- Release: 5 December 2002 – 16 January 2003

The Future Is Wild (also referred to by the acronym FIW) is a 2002 speculative evolution docufiction miniseries and an accompanying multimedia entertainment franchise. The Future Is Wild explores the ecosystems and wildlife of three future time periods: 5 million, 100 million, and 200 million years in the future, in the format of a nature documentary. Though the settings and animals are fictional, the series has an educational purpose, serving as an informative and entertaining way to explore concepts such as evolution and climate change.

The Future Is Wild was first conceived by independent producer Joanna Adams (Note: Adams was assigned male at birth and is in most of the early The Future Is Wild material recorded under her birth name, John Adams.) in 1996 and developed together with various scientists, including Dougal Dixon, best known as the author of the 1981 book After Man, which also explored future wildlife. The 2002 series was an international co-production, involving the Franco-German channel Arte, the German ZDF, the Austrian ORF, the Italian MFE - MediaForEurope (via their Mediaset division), and the American Animal Planet and Discovery Channel. Wildly successful, The Future Is Wild continues to be broadcast to this day and has been shown on TV in more than 60 countries.

The success of The Future Is Wild spawned a large multimedia franchise, including books, children's entertainment, exhibitions, theme park rides, educational material, and toys. There have also been cancelled projects, such as a potential movie adaptation, as well as a sequel series, The Future Is Wild 2. From 2016 onwards, there has been talk of "relaunching" the franchise through various projects, such as an action-adventure TV series and The Future is Wild VR (a virtual reality videogame), though no new media has yet materialized.

== Premise ==
The Future Is Wild explores twelve different future ecosystems across three future time periods: 5 million years in the future, 100 million years in the future, and 200 million years in the future. Four ecosystems from each period are explored and described.

=== Ice World: 5 million years in the future ===
The early episodes describe a world after an ice age, when giant seal-like sea-birds roam the beaches and carnivorous bats rule the skies. Ice sheets extend as far south as Paris in the northern hemisphere and as far north as Buenos Aires in the southern hemisphere. The Amazon rainforest has dried up and become grassland. The North American plains have become a cold desert, and Africa has collided with Europe, enclosing the Mediterranean Sea. Without water to replace it in the dry climate, the Mediterranean has dried out into a salt flat dotted with brine lakes, as it has been in the past. Most of Europe is a frozen tundra. The part of Africa east of the African Rift Valley has broken away from the rest of the continent. Asia has dried up and is now mountainous. The once warm, tropical area of Central America has been transformed into a dry area. Australia has moved north and collided with eastern Indonesia.

=== Hothouse World: 100 million years in the future ===
In the scenario for 100 million years in the future, the Earth has a muggy hothouse climate. Octopuses and enormous tortoises have come on to the land, much of which is flooded by shallow seas surrounded by brackish swamps surrounding jungles. Antarctica has drifted towards the tropics and is covered with dense rainforests, as it was before. Australia has collided with North America and Asia, forcing up an enormous, 12-kilometre-high mountain plateau much taller than the modern Himalayas. Greenland has been reduced to a small, temperate island. There are cold, deep ocean trenches. The Sahara has once again become the rich grassland it was millions of years ago.

=== New World: 200 million years in the future ===
The hypothetical world of 200 million years from now is recovering from a mass extinction caused by a flood basalt eruption even larger than the one that created the Siberian Traps, wiping out 95% of the species on the planet. Fish have taken to the skies, squid to the forests, and the world's largest-ever desert is filled with strange worms and insects. All the continents have collided with one another and fused into a single heavily desertified supercontinent, a Second Pangaea or New Pangea. Although the formation of this new supercontinent has caused most distinctive geological features of its components to disappear, some can still be discerned, including Hudson Bay, the Novaya Zemlya archipelago and the Scandinavian Peninsula, as well as the general outline of Africa. One large global ocean with a single-current system gives rise to deadly hurricanes called hypercanes, which batter the coastlines of the continent all year long. The northwestern side of Pangaea II, drenched with an endless supply of rain, has become a temperate forest. Mountains resting at the end of the coast prevent most of the rain's moisture from reaching a long line of scrubby rainshadow deserts. The very center of the continent receives no rain at all and has become a barren, plantless desert. The survivors of the aforementioned mass extinction - fish, arthropods, worms and mollusks - populate the Earth and continue the process of adaptation and evolution.

== Development and production ==
The idea for The Future Is Wild was first conceived in 1996 by Joanna Adams, a British entrepreneur who has previously produced documentaries on modern and extinct animals. As an independent producer, Adams wanted to create a documentary series different from anything that had come before, and something that could not be copied by larger production companies. The series was envisioned as an entertaining, informative and inspirational way to explain planetary change and evolution, suitable for the popular market worldwide. In 1996, the concept of the series, and ideas for an accompanying multimedia franchise, was first unveiled at the Frankfurt Book Fair and the MIPTV Media Market.

The Future Is Wild was influenced by Scottish geologist and paleontologist Dougal Dixon's 1981 book After Man, which imagines wildlife and ecosystems 50 million years in the future. Dixon was brought in as a consultant early on in the development of the series and designed many of the creatures featured. The series was not able to use any of Dixon's creatures from After Man, given that the rights to adapting After Man were at this time owned by DreamWorks SKG. Nevertheless, several creatures were similar to Dixon's earlier designs, such as the Gannetwhale, a seal-like bird similar to whale-like penguins in After Man.

The series was created in close collaboration with scientists, filmmakers and animators. Although the future creatures and environments created for the series are all fictional, they were based on evolutionary principles and grounded in science. According to Adams: "If you look at the creatures, you cannot say with any degree of accuracy that this is going to happen, but what you can say is, given certain conditions, creatures like this could develop." Adams felt that it was important that the series would not just be dismissed as "another science-fiction fantasy", but that it would instead be seen as something credible. The geography of the future worlds depicted were designed through collaboration with geologists, and botanists and weather experts were consulted for the future environments. In addition to Dougal Dixon, several other animal experts, biomechanics engineers, and other scientists took part in designing the animals in the series.

In total, development and production of The Future Is Wild took six years. Throughout its development, some television executives had very different and conflicting ideas of what the series should be. In particular, some were concerned about humans being absent and wished for a contrived explanation as to what happened to humanity. Adams co-produced the series with the Franco-German channel Arte, the German ZDF, the Austrian ORF, the Italian Mediaset and the American Animal Planet and Discovery Channel. In total, the series cost £5 million to make.

== Episodes ==
No.	Title	Original release date
1	"Welcome to the Future"	
An introductory episode, giving an overview of the series and featuring many clips from later episodes. 'Welcome to the Future' also discusses which animals are likely to go extinct in the near future and briefly touches on the absence of humans in the future.
2	"Return of the Ice"	
This episode is set in North Europe, 5 million years into the future. It focuses on three hypothesized species: (1) Shagrat, a descendant of the marmot that has grown in size and developed thicker fur and a smaller nose to protect it from the cold; (2) Snowstalker, a descendant of the wolverine that has evolved sabre-teeth to kill large prey the same way as how smilodons hunted megafauna, white fur for camouflage and a keen yet sensitive sense of smell for hunting and foraging with one drawback being it can't stand disgusting smells; (3) Gannetwhale, a descendant of the gannet, which has given up on flying, grown to immense size to replace the sea mammals and lays eggs on land similarly to penguins. The episode explains that the onset of the ice age was very fast, so many animals died out. The ones that did survive had to have quick generations so they evolved fast. The episode follows the story of a female Snowstalker hunting for Shagrats and teaching her cubs to hunt, the Gannetwhale's breeding season and defending themselves and their eggs against the same Snowstalker attempting to take one of their eggs, and the southern mass migration of the Shagrats in search of food to eat.
3	"The Vanished Sea"	
This episode is set in what was once the Mediterranean, 5 million years in the future. It features three species: (1) Cryptile, a lizard with a sticky frill to catch flies; (2) Scrofa, a descendant of the wild boar, which has developed spindly legs to allow it to live on rocky islands in the desert; (3) Gryken, a descendant of the pine marten, which hunts Scrofa in the cracked rocks of the landscape. Because of the collision between Africa and the southern tip of Spain, the Mediterranean has been enclosed and dried up, becoming an enormous salt desert with a few lakes of ultra-saline water. The episode follows the mating season of the Cryptiles, brine flies thriving in the salty conditions along with the Cryptiles who eat and drink them, and Grykens hunting for food, as well as a young Scrofa who ends up leaving the rocks and gets lost in the salt desert with a sad end.
4	"Prairies of Amazonia"	
This episode is set in South America where the Amazon rainforest used to be, 5 million years in the future. It features three species: (1) Carakillers, a descendant of the mountain caracara, which has evolved to replace land predators, even though they were inspired by Phorusrhacidae (aka terror-birds). (2) Babookari, a descendant of the uakari, which lives like baboons and has discovered how to catch fish; (3) Rattleback, a descendant of the agouti, which has developed tough armor and can live through quickly-passing grass fires. By this time, the Amazon rainforest has been replaced by grassland. The episode follows the various animals of the Amazon prairies, seeing the Babookari become smarter than their ancestors through the construction of tools and a prairie fire threatening to tear the local environment apart with Carakillers using the fire to eat tiny creatures who flee from the fire.
5	"Cold Kansas Desert"	
The episode is set in Kansas, 5 million years into the future. The episode focuses on three species: (1) Deathgleaner, a massive carnivorous false vampire bat that spends the day hunting for prey in the desert and spends the night in a communal roost; (2) Spink, a descendant of the quail with blade-like wings and a similar lifestyle to the naked mole-rat; and (3) Desert Rattleback, a descendant of the agouti that lives in the cold regions. The episode explains that the onset of the ice age caused the agricultural belt of the United States to turn into a desert, and shows how the animals have evolved to cope with the harsh features of this forbidding landscape.
6	"Waterland"	
The episode is set in Kolkata, India, 100 million years in the future. The episode focuses on three species: (1) Toraton, a descendant of the giant tortoise and, at 120 tons, the largest creature ever to walk the Earth; (2) Swampus, a descendant of the octopus, which has formed a symbiotic relationship with a plant to house its young, and has evolved to stay above water, but only for a short amount of time, like the modern day mudskipper. (3) Lurkfish, a descendant of the electric catfish that is an ambush predator and can fire up to 1000 volts to stun prey. The episode shows that, at this point in the future, the large amount of greenhouse gases generated by volcanoes have caused the planet to overheat. It is also explored how Swampuses breed and how Toratons have evolved to cope with their massive size.
7	"Flooded World"	
The episode is set in shallow seas of Paris, 100 million years into the future. The episode focuses on three species thatlive together: (1) Ocean Phantom, a type of colonial portuguese man-of-war that can grow to ten metres in diameter; (2) Reef Glider, a descendant of the sea slug, which hunts ocean phantoms; (3) Spindle Trooper, sea spiders that live in chambers on the Ocean Phantom and protect it from danger. The Ocean Phantom in return feeds it. This episode focuses on the extinction of the coral reefs and their replacement with red algae reefs. It shows how this food chain works and how the animals have evolved together.
8	"Tropical Antarctica"	
The episode is set in Antarctica, 100 million years into the future. The episode focuses on four species: (1) Roachcutter, a descendant of an undisclosed sea bird and one of the first species to colonize Antarctica; (2) Falconfly, a large descendant of the wasp, which preys on the Roachcutter and other birds; (3) Spitfire Bird, a descendant of an undisclosed sea bird that collects chemicals from flowers of the Spitfire tree, which it then spits at enemies; (4) Spitfire Beetle, a beetle or mantis that gathers in groups of four to take on the appearance of a Spitfire flower. At this point in the future, Antarctica has moved so far north it is now on the equator and has grown a tropical jungle. It shows how the seabirds have evolved to deal with the new dangers of the jungle.
9	"The Great Plateau"	
The episode is set in a plateau created by the collision of Australia and Japan, 100 million years into the future. The episode focuses on four species: (1) Silver Spiders, a descendant of modern spiders, that live in huge colonies, have a caste system based on size and build massive webs across canyons; (2) Poggle, a descendant of the hamster and the last mammal species on Earth at this time; (3) Great Blue Windrunner, a brilliant blue bird with wings on its legs, sees in ultraviolet and lives at the highest points on the plateau; (4) Grass Trees, tree-like plants descended from bamboo. The episode explores the nature of this bizarre food chain, including how the Poggles are effectively farmed by the Silver Spiders. At the end of the episode, it's revealed that the increase in volcanic activity, which caused the planet to warm up, will also lead to a huge mass extinction, wiping out almost all life on Earth.
10	"The Endless Desert"	
The episode is set in the central desert of the new supercontinent, 200 million years into the future. At this point in the future, there are no mammals, birds, reptiles or amphibians, as they were all wiped out by the mass extinction. The episode focuses on four species: (1) Terabyte, descendants of termites that live in massive air-conditioned underground cities and farm algae; (2) Gardenworm, a descendant of the Convoluta worms that house green algae in fleshy lobes on their back that convert sunlight into food for it; (3) Slickribbon, a transparent worm with pincer jaws and a nasty sting; (4) Gloomworm, a simple worm that is descended from a single type of bristleworm that survived the mass extinction. With no rainfall reaching the middle of the single continent, water is scarce and many animals live in underground lakes and caves to get away from the heat of the desert.
11	"The Global Ocean"	
The episode is set in the oceans, 200 million years in the future. The episode focuses on four species: (1) Rainbow Squid, a massive squid, which changes color to hide; (2) Ocean Flish, descendants of flying fish, which have evolved to breathe out of water and have developed wings; (3) Sharkopath, a descendant of sharks that have bioluminescent patches on their sides to communicate with one another; (4) Silverswimmer, descendants of crustaceans that have grown in size and evolved to fill the roles that fish previously held. The episode explores the strange lifeforms and ways of life in the future ocean.
12	"Graveyard Desert"	
The episode is set in a rain shadow desert on the eastern side of the new supercontinent, 200 million years into the future. Wedged between the Endless Desert and the Global Ocean is a series of tall mountain ranges that are tall enough to block all but the most powerful storms. The episode focuses on four species: (1) Bumblebeetle, a highly-specialized species of beetle that spends its entire life seeking out the bodies of dead animals; (2) Grimworm, a worm and the larval stage of the Bumblebeetle, that lives in the bodies of dead animals, scavenging the organs from the inside; (3) Desert Hopper, a bizarre rabbit-sized cone snail that hops about on one muscular foot; (4) Deathbottle, a large carnivorous plant, that uses traps to feed on the Desert Hoppers and has a flower that looks and smells like a dead Flish to trick Bumblebeetles into picking up the plant's seeds from the flower and planting them around dead animals. The episode explores how these bizarre creatures have evolved to survive in such a harsh environment fueled by Ocean Flish from the last episode who get swept into the desert over the mountains by powerful storms and the inhabitants of the desert taking advantage of the Flish corpses that end up in the desert.
13	"The Tentacled Forest"	
The episode is set in the northern forest of the new supercontinent, 200 million years into the future. The episode focuses on five species: (1) Lichen Trees, a bush-like species evolved from simple lichens; (2) Forest Flish, a smaller species of flish with hooks for feet so it can hang upside down on tree branches to rest; (3) Megasquid, a five-metre-tall (16 ft) squid with rhinoceros-like skin; (4) Squibbon, an arboreal species of squid that swing through trees and have stereoscopic vision; (5) Slithersucker, an arboreal species of predatory and giant slime mold. This episode explores the strange forms of life in one of the few places on Earth where there is still consistent rain and plants can grow. It ends by suggesting that the Squibbons may eventually develop sapience and create a new civilization like how apes have evolved into humans.

== Distribution ==
The Future Is Wild aired on Animal Planet in the United Kingdom, on the Discovery Channel and Animal Planet in the United States, on ZDF in Germany, on ORF in Austria and on Mediaset in Italy. The series was wildly successful, winning several accolades and achieving high ratings on channels worldwide. The premiere of The Future Is Wild on Animal Planet in the United States doubled the channel's previous highest viewership (being viewed by about 1.8 million households) and The Future Is Wild to this day remains the number one most viewed series in Animal Planet's history. ZDF Enterprises sold the television rights of the series to 18 markets: Belgium, Canada, Croatia, the Czech Republic, Ecuador, France, Germany, Hong Kong, Hungary, Japan, Korea, Mexico, the Middle East, Poland, Romania, Russia, Slovenia and Venezuela. The series continues to be licensed internationally. As of 2021, The Future Is Wild has been broadcast in over 60 countries.

== Multimedia franchise ==
Following the airing of the series, The Future Is Wild branched out into various other media, including books, children's entertainment, exhibitions, theme park rides, educational material and toys.

=== Books ===
The Future Is Wild was accompanied by two companion books, The Future Is Wild: A Natural History of the Future (2002), co-authored by Dougal Dixon and Joanna Adams, and The Wild World of the Future (2003) by Claire Pye. The Future Is Wild: A Natural History of the Future is a 128-page family reference work and The Wild World of the Future is a 96-page reference work for younger children. These books were translated into 20 languages. The French translation of The Wild World of the Future, titled Les Animaux du Futur ('The Animals of the Future'), incorporated augmented reality, one of the first books to do so.

Another children's reference work, also 96 pages long, was co-authored by Dougal Dixon and Joanna Adams in the 2010s, titled The Future Is Wild: Our World Tomorrow. The book was published in 2016 in China by Hunan Publishing. Internationally, the book has been released in eBook and iBook format as an augmented reality book, under the title The Future Is Wild: The Living Book. The Future Is Wild: The Living Book was released in 2011, first presented at the 2011 Frankfurt Book Fair. The more than forty different augmented reality features were developed by the German company Meatio. The book has received scholarly attention as a work that showcases how augmented reality can encourage readers to connect with a book.

=== Animated children’s series ===
In 2007, a 3D animated children's series (targeted at children aged six to twelve) based on The Future Is Wild premiered on Discovery Kids. Consisting of 26 episodes, each 22 minutes in length, the series was also simply called The Future Is Wild, and followed the four children C.G., Ethan, Emily and Luis, and their pet Squibbon, as they travelled through time and explored the settings and animals seen in the original series. According to Joanna Adams, the animated series, just like the original series, encourages viewers to think about the future of the planet, but "this time it is devoted particularly to kids and our future science is woven into some really fun stories about a group of time travelling kids." Portions of the original The Future Is Wild team worked on the series, and it was jointly produced by the Singaporean company iVL Animation and the Canadian company Nelvana. It was the first co-produced Singaporean 3D-animated TV programme to be broadcast in the United States and Germany.

=== Exhibitions ===
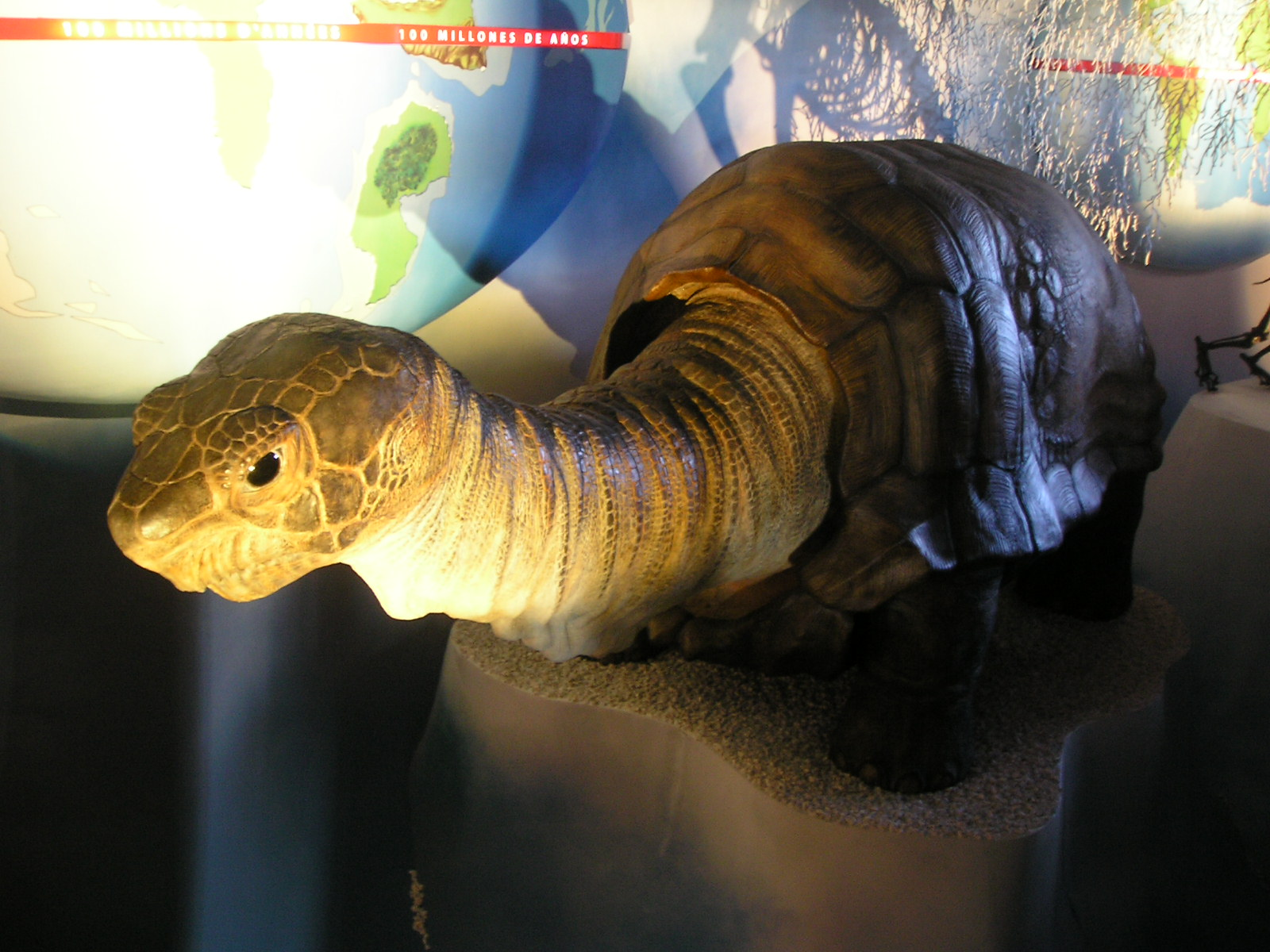
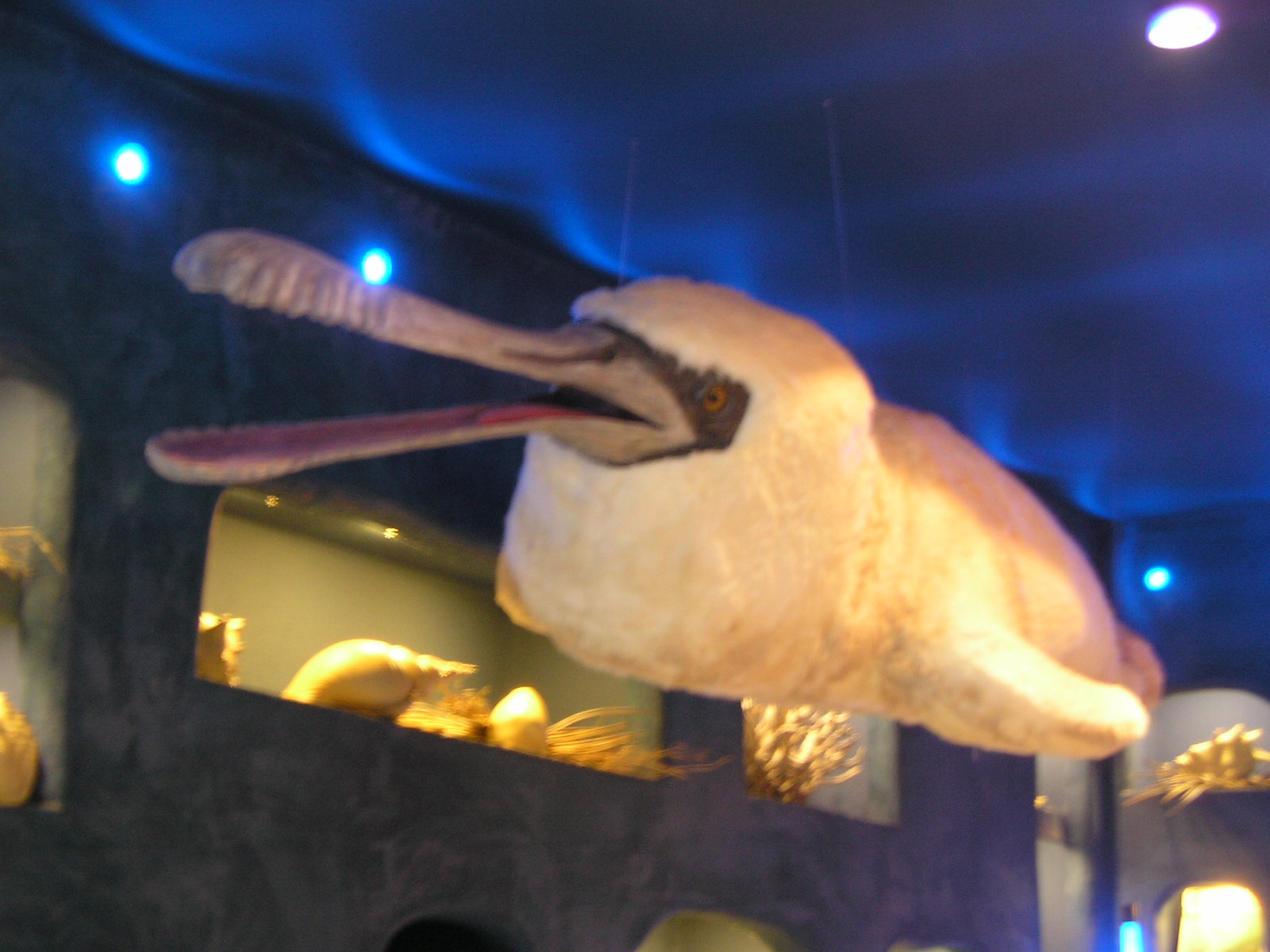
Toraton (top) and Gannetwhale (bottom) models, as exhibited at Futuroscope in France from 2008 to 2012

The Future Is Wild has been adapted into exhibition form, both for use as a temporary exhibition or short-term events, and for long-term high-profile attractions. There have been four notable The Future Is Wild special exhibitions: at Futuroscope in France, the Sydney Aquarium in Australia, Dinosaurier-Park Münchehagen in Germany and Dinosaurierpark Teufelsschlucht in Germany. There have also been exhibitions elsewhere, for instance in Japan.

The exhibition at Futuroscope was called Les Animaux du Futur and was inaugurated on 5 April 2008 by French politician Hervé Novelli. The exhibition itself was fully interactive, utilizing augmented reality technology, and also contained the first augmented reality theme park ride in the world. The ride involved visitors sitting in a car, equipped with sensor-bracelets and googles with LCD-screens. The ride then simulated a time travel-safari expedition, with visitors being able to interact with the various creatures they encounter. In total, the exhibition cost €7 million to make. The exhibition received recognition among specialists in virtual reality, being the recipient of the prestigious Laval Virtual award in 2008. Les Animaux du Futur was shut down in 2012.

Like the Futuroscope exhibition and ride, the Sydney Aquarium exhibition, open from 2010 to 2011, employed advanced technology such as holograms, computer-generated imagery, animatronics and augmented reality. Among other things, augmented reality and face-tracking technology was used to allow visitors to see themselves in virtual diving gear, diving alongside some of the creatures. In contrast to most special exhibitions, The Future Is Wild installations were separated into species-specific installations spread throughout the aquarium, rather than concentrated in one place and each showcased new technologies. The exhibition also intended to encourage school participation, launching a competition called "Design a Future Marine Creature", which saw the winning design become a "life-size" permanent exhibit at the aquarium.

The exhibition at Dinosaurier-Park Münchehagen, opened in 2012, was considerably different from the French and Australian exhibitions, opting for a much more traditional exhibition containing just "life-size" models of some of the creatures of The Future Is Wild, with realistic backgrounds behind them. The hall containing the models was designed to act as a "journey's end", after visitors have walked through the millions of years of prehistoric creatures exhibited elsewhere in the park. In 2016, the sixteen The Future Is Wild models were moved to Dinosaurierpark Teufelsschlucht, another park, and placed at the end of the park's walkway of exhibited models of dinosaurs and other prehistoric creatures.

=== Other ===
In 2004, The Future Is Wild was adapted into a 20-minute fulldome film. The fulldome film was made by Evans & Sutherland, in association with Discovery Channel International, Animal Planet and GOTO Optical Company and is narrated by the American actor John de Lancie.

The Future Is Wild had a very strong fanbase in Japan. In 2006–2007, the series was adapted into a story-driven manga, written and illustrated by artist Takaaki Ogawa. A line of toy figurines based on creatures from The Future Is Wild was produced by Tokyo-based company Diamond in 2006. Seven figures were released, each about five centimetres tall, depicting the Gannetwhale, Carakiller, Toraton, Poggle, Terabyte, Ocean Flish and Megasquid. The figures were also released in France in 2008 to coincide with the opening of the exhibition at Futuroscope, and in Australia in 2010 to coincide with the exhibition at the Sydney Aquarium.

Since The Future Is Wild is based on actual science concerning evolution, the environment, ecology and climate change, the series has been adapted into educational material. Marketed as "a unique mix of science and imagination combined with education and entertainment", there are United Kingdom curriculum specific lesson plans based on the series, which are freely available. Among other things, lessons include children creating their own future environments, plants and animals. In France, experimental educational projects were coordinated with The Future Is Wild exhibition at Futuroscope, and included classroom resources such as printed charts and an interactive CD-ROM programme.

=== Cancelled projects ===
Following the success of The Future Is Wild, plans were made to adapt the series into a feature film with Warner Bros., but those plans fell through after the release of the film Avatar (2009), when Warner Bros. felt that the bar for such a film had been raised too high. Joanna Adams and the team at one point also worked on developing a sequel documentary series to the original The Future Is Wild series, dubbed The Future Is Wild 2, and had raised the necessary funding, but the project collapsed when Discovery Channel announced that they would no longer be making documentaries.

In 2015, the virtual reality and augmented reality developer Cornel Hillmann, and his studio, STUDIO CGARTIST, began developing The Future Is Wild for virtual reality, initially focusing on small-scale preview projects. The first completed project was a small preview programme for Google Cardboard, which met with positive response at the 2016 Frankfurt Book Fair. A The Future Is Wild virtual reality game, The Future Is Wild VR, was in development in 2016. According to Hillmann, the game was intended to be a first-person exploration game with survival elements, with players able to travel through five future time periods between 50 and 200 million years in the future. The game was also planned to introduce 20 new creatures, some of them based on designs originally intended for the unproduced The Future Is Wild 2. Hillmann had the opportunity to correspond with Dougal Dixon, who offered his input on some of the designs. In 2019, the game was still in development. According to Hillmann, The Future Is Wild VR would eventually be part of a "major brand relaunch" alongside other types of The Future Is Wild media and material. In September 2024, Adams confirmed that the VR game was no longer in development.

=== Planned revival of the franchise ===
In 2016, John H. Williams, a producer of the animated Shrek franchise, and his animation company Vanguard Animation, acquired the rights to produce an animated TV series based on The Future Is Wild. In a January 2016 interview, Williams stated that "we believe The Future Is Wild will be a spectacular franchise launch point for us into quality television" and also mentioned that Vanguard Animation was working on creating a 26-part science fiction action-adventure series, planned to be produced as an international co-production.

At the same time as Vanguard Animation acquired the rights to produce a new TV series, Adams also stated in an interview that she was looking at relaunching the franchise: "coinciding with this new series development, we are rolling out our plans for digital media, such as mobile games, apps and interactive multimedia books". Adams believes that more modern technology could help to lift and help launch The Future Is Wild in a new direction, while still re-creating or further developing some of the "original stories" and "original themes". Coinciding with this attempted revival of the franchise, The Future Is Wild was once more at the Frankfurt Book Fair and MIPTV Media Market events in 2016 to present new planned content.

In 2024, Adams claimed that they are in the early stages of development for a new documentary series.
