= Matthew Wolf-Meyer =

American anthropologist

- Born: Matthew Joseph Wolf-Meyer; July 19, 1976 (age 49); Warren, Michigan, U.S.
- Occupation: Anthropologist
- Years active: 2002–present

Matthew Wolf-Meyer is an American anthropologist.

== Education ==
Wolf-Meyer graduated with the Ph.D. from the University of Minnesota.

== Career and research ==
He served as an assistant professor of anthropology at Wayne State University in 2007–2008, an assistant and associate professor of anthropology at the University of California, Santa Cruz, from 2008 to 2015, and is currently an associate professor of anthropology at Binghamton University. From 2021 to 2023, he is a Senior Research Fellow at the Institute for Advanced Study at Tampere University in Tampere, Finland. He is the author of three books. The first is called The Slumbering Masses: Sleep, Medicine and Modern American Life which was published in 2012, and received the Society for Medical Anthropology's New Millennium Book Award in 203. His second book, Theory for the World to Come: Speculative Fiction and Apocalyptic Anthropology, was published in 2019, and his most recent book, Unraveling: Remaking Personhood in a Neurodiverse Age was published in 2020.

Wolf-Meyer's research focuses on the interconnections between science and technology studies, bioethics, and disability studies. His work draws on poststructuralist and affect theory—particularly the work of Gilles Deleuze and Felix Guattari—to develop frameworks to conceptualize human variation in ways that move beyond typical understandings of disability, impairment, and medicalization. He is most associated with anti-reductive approaches to race and disability, represented in his work on the biology of everyday life and affective bioethics.

His work has been profiled in the New Yorker, the Los Angeles Review of Books, and other leading journals in the sciences and social sciences.
