= After Man =

1981 book by Dougal Dixon

After Man A Zoology of the Future
- Cover of a 1998 paperback edition by St. Martin's Press. The cover depicts the Reedstilt (Harundopes virgatus), a tall fish-eating talpid from Eurasia.
- Author: Dougal Dixon
- Language: English
- Genre: Speculative evolution
- Publisher: Granada Publishing (UK); St. Martin's Press (US)
- Publication date: 1981
- Publication place: United Kingdom
- Media type: Print (hardback and paperback)
- Pages: 128
- ISBN: 978-0586057506

After Man: A Zoology of the Future is a 1981 speculative evolution book written by Scottish geologist and paleontologist Dougal Dixon and illustrated by several illustrators including Diz Wallis, John Butler, Brian McIntyre, Philip Hood, Roy Woodard and Gary Marsh. The book features a foreword by Desmond Morris. After Man explores a hypothetical future set 50 million years after extinction of humanity, a time period Dixon dubs the "Posthomic", which is inhabited by animals that have evolved from survivors of a mass extinction succeeding our own time.

After Man used a fictional setting and hypothetical animals to explain the natural processes behind evolution and natural selection. In total, over a hundred different invented animal species are featured in the book, described as part of fleshed-out fictional future ecosystems. Reviews for After Man were highly positive and its success spawned two follow-up speculative evolution books which used new fictional settings and creatures to explain other natural processes: The New Dinosaurs (1988) and Man After Man (1990).

After Man and Dixon's following books inspired the speculative evolution artistic movement which focuses on speculative scenarios in the evolution of life, often possible future scenarios (such as After Man) or alternative paths in the past (such as The New Dinosaurs). Dixon is often considered the founder of the modern speculative evolution movement.

== Summary ==
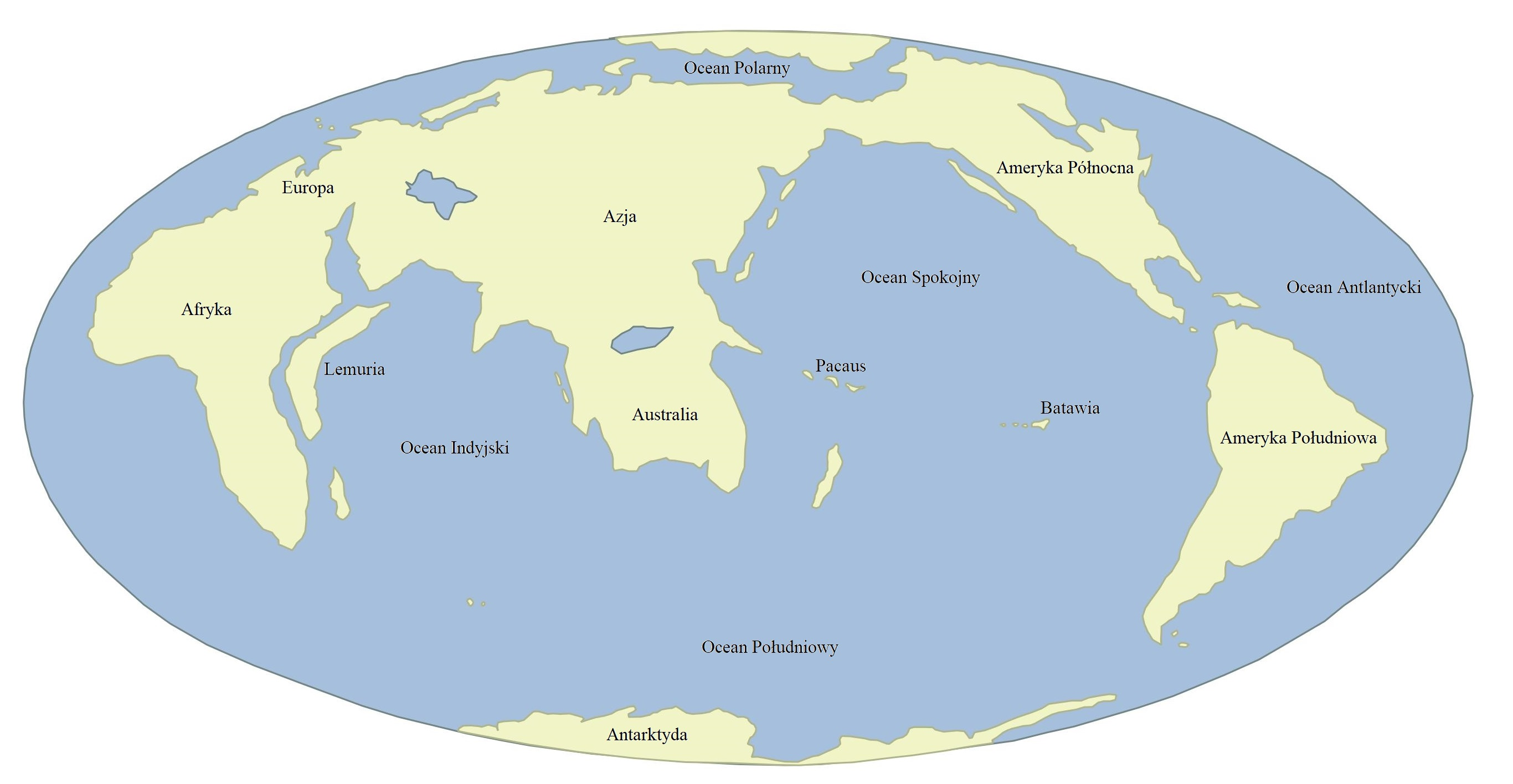
Polish-language map of the continents in After Man, having experienced 50 million years of continental drift since the present day

After Man explores an imagined future Earth, set 50 million years from the present, hypothesizing what new animals might evolve in the timespan between its setting and the present day. Ecology and evolutionary theory are applied to create believable creatures, all of which have their own binomial names and text describing their behaviour and interactions with other contemporary animals.

In this new period of the Cenozoic, which Dixon calls the "Posthomic", Europe and Africa have fused, closing the Mediterranean Sea; whereas Asia and North America have collided and closed the Bering Strait; South America has split from Central America; Australia has collided with Southern Asia (colliding with the mainland sometime in the last 10 million years), uplifting a mountain range beyond the mountains of the Far East that has become the most extensive and the highest chain in the world, greater even than the Himalayas at their zenith 50 million years ago; and parts of eastern Africa have split off to form a new island called Lemuria. Other volcanic islands have been added, such as the Pacaus archipelago and Batavia.

Over a hundred future animal species are described and illustrated in the book. Major groups include the "rabbucks", versatile descendants of rabbits filling the ecological niches of deer, zebras, giraffes and antelope; "gigantelopes", descendants of antelope filling niches held by elephants, giraffes, moose, musk oxen, rhinoceroses, and other large herbivores; "vortexes" and "porpins", descendants of penguins evolved to fill the aquatic niche of cetaceans; and the predatory rats, the major group of terrestrial predators and descendants of rats.

There are also more bizarre creatures such as the "raboons", gigantic theropod-esque descendants of baboons; the "night stalker", a gigantic predatory leaf-nosed bat native to Batavia; the "desert leaper", a giant kangaroo-like dipodid; and the "chiselhead", a descendant of the eastern gray squirrel that has evolved a wormlike shape and large incisors for chiseling into coniferous trees (hence its name).

== Development ==
As a child, Dixon was inspired by H. G. Wells' The Time Machine, particularly the far-future creatures featured in the book, to create his own imaginary future animals descended from creatures of the modern day. These animals often served as background characters in Dixon's own retellings of Wells' work. In the 1960s, Dixon was influenced by the contemporary conservationist movements, especially a campaign to save the tigers. Dixon began to ponder that should the tiger and other endangered animals go extinct, something would inevitably take their place. After seeing a "Save the Whale" badge on a friend in the late 1970s, the idea materialized again. Thinking of what might evolve to take their place if whales did go extinct eventually led to the idea of the giant aquatic penguins in the final book.

Dixon devised After Man as a popular-level book on the processes of evolution that instead of using the past to tell the story projected the processes into the future. After finishing a dummy version of the book, with text and his own illustrations, Dixon took the book to two different publishers in London, both of whom immediately greenlit the project.

When designing the various animals of the book, Dixon looked at the different types of biomes on the planet and what adaptations animals living there have, designing new animals descended from modern day ones with the same set of adaptations. Though Dixon made illustrations of his future animals to pitch the project, the final book used illustrations by other artists due to a publisher decision. Dixon created detailed illustrations that the artists followed in the creation of the final artwork featured in After Man.

One of few major speculative evolution works which preceded After Man, German zoologist Gerolf Steiner's 1957 Bau und Leben der Rhinogradentia, which included a complete fictional order of mammals (the "Rhinogradentia", or "snouters"), included some ideas similar to what was later featured in Dixon's work, such as an animal with a face mimicking a flower (also present on a future bat in After Man). Dixon was completely unaware of Steiner's work, however, and had not used it as an inspiration.

=== Later editions ===
In March 2018, Breakdown Press published a new edition of the book, updated to reflect modern science relating to evolution. The updated version also features new artwork for some of the animals, created by Dixon himself. The release of the new edition was celebrated with an event hosted at Conway Hall in London on 11 September that same year, which included a joint talk with Dixon and British paleontologist and science writer Darren Naish. The event also included showcases of original sketches and models and a showing of the Japanese stop-motion adaptation of After Man.

A 40th Anniversary Edition of After Man was published by Breakdown Press in February 2022, featuring 18 additional pages of production material and previously unpublished sketches as well as a new afterword written by Dixon.

== Reception ==
The first review of After Man was one made by Professor Barry Cox of King's College London in a science-based radio programme. Cox's review was extremely negative, but subsequent reviews were highly positive. Peter Stoler's review in Time called the animals in the book "variously amusing or appalling" but "perfectly logical". Dan Brothwell, writing for the British Book News stated that the world depicted in After Man is not one "of absurd monsters", since Dixon had carefully derived his animals from "the biological reality of the past and present" and had "taken careful note of the biological factors that account for the evolution of lifeforms". The review by Redmond O'Hanlon in The Times Literary Supplement particularly praised the introductionary essays on natural selection, genetics and various other natural processes. Reviews in New Scientist and BBC Wildlife also praised the book and Dixon went on publicity tours in the United States and the United Kingdom.

After Man was at the time of its release portrayed in reviews as a book about the extinction of mankind, though Dixon has stated that mankind's end was simply an excuse to discuss evolution, humanity having very little do with the "plot" of the book. Following its success, the book has been translated into a number of different languages.

In 1982, the book was a finalist for the Hugo Award for Best Related Work.

== Legacy ==
Following the success of After Man, Dixon realized that there was a market for popular-level books which use fictional examples and settings to explain factual scientific processes. While After Man had explained the process of evolution by creating a complex hypothetical future ecosystem, the "sequel" The New Dinosaurs (1988) was instead aimed at creating a book on zoogeography, a subject the general public was quite unfamiliar with, by using a fictional world in which the non-avian dinosaurs had not gone extinct to explain the process. The New Dinosaurs was followed by another project in 1990, Man After Man, which focused on climate change over the next few million years through the eyes of future human species genetically engineered to adapt to it.

Although ideas about future creatures had been explored since H. G. Wells's The Time Machine in 1895, After Man was the first large-scale project that went into detail on several species. The fact that Dixon created an entire fictional world, which was then made easily accessible through a book with color illustrations printed by mainstream publishing companies had a large impact and effectively laid the foundation of speculative evolution, which in recent years has been increasingly popular on the internet through various personal projects.

Many of the animals presented in the book remain plausible even in the light of more modern discoveries, with particular examples including the rise of animals that were transported around the world by humans (for instance the rats) to prominent positions within worldwide ecology and that corvids and rodents could evolve into various predatory roles. Other ideas are seen as somewhat less likely, such as the theropod-like gait used by predatory descendants of baboons (though predatory baboons as an idea isn't considered as unlikely) and the evolution of penguins into huge, whale-like filter-feeders. Some of the animals featured in the book, in particular the popular "night stalker" (a giant and flightless predatory descendant of bats), have inspired numerous similar designs through speculative evolution projects since. Future flightless predatory bats are perhaps most famous for their inclusion within the ITV series Primeval (2007–2011) in the form of the "future predators".

The Future is Wild, a 2002 miniseries, features future animals evolving over the course of several million years. Early in its development, Dixon was brought in as a consultant. Dixon designed many of the creatures featured in the programme, some of which are similar to creatures in After Man (such as the "gannetwhale", a bird similar to the whale-like penguins of After Man), and co-authored the companion book with the producer of the series, John Adams. The Future is Wild also focused considerably on future environmental changes, something Dixon avoided in After Man so that readers would at the very least recognize the background inhabited by the various future animals.

== Adaptations ==
Japanese markets were highly interested in After Man, and Japanese adaptations were made of the book, including both a 1990 stop-motion documentary and an animated film. To date, Dixon's 2010 speculative evolution book Greenworld, exploring humanity's impact on an alien ecosystem, has only been published in Japan.

The Future is Wild was unable to use Dixon's original creatures as DreamWorks SKG had bought and owned the rights to After Man. DreamWorks eventually abandoned the project, and the rights were then bought by Paramount, though no potential movie adaptation has yet materialized.

=== Exhibitions ===
In 1987, an exhibition based on the book and organized by a Japanese exhibition company, featuring a number of "life"-size models of the animals featured therein, was displayed at the Denver Museum of Natural History, from 6 February to 3 May, and then at the California Academy of Sciences from 5 June to 7 September. The exhibition began with a "time tunnel", which visitors passed through before being met by several dioramas featuring the speculative future animals, including two full-size animatronic figures produced by Dinamation. According to spokespeople from both museums, the exhibition garnered positive reactions from visitors. The exhibition also included illustrations Dixon had previously made of a possible future evolutionary path of humanity, previously published under the title Visions of Man Evolved in Omni in 1982. Prior to this, a limited version of the exhibition (featuring 8 models rather than the 19 dioramas featured in the 1987 version) had been at the Newquay Zoo in Cornwall in 1983, in Japan in 1984 and in various locations within the United States from 1985 to 1986. The exhibition was later featured at the Orlando Science Center in 1989 and the Science Museum of Western Virginia in 1992.

A new After Man exhibition was organized at the Fukuoka City Science Museum in Fukuoka, Japan in 2021. Running from 20 November 2021 to 23 January 2022, the exhibition featured new models of animals from the book alongside animations of them in natural environments. The exhibition also featured new animals designed for the world of After Man by Dixon. The exhibition was then put up at the Nagasaki City Dinosaur Museum in Nagasaki from 26 March to 7 October 2022.
