= Speculative evolution =

Science fiction genre

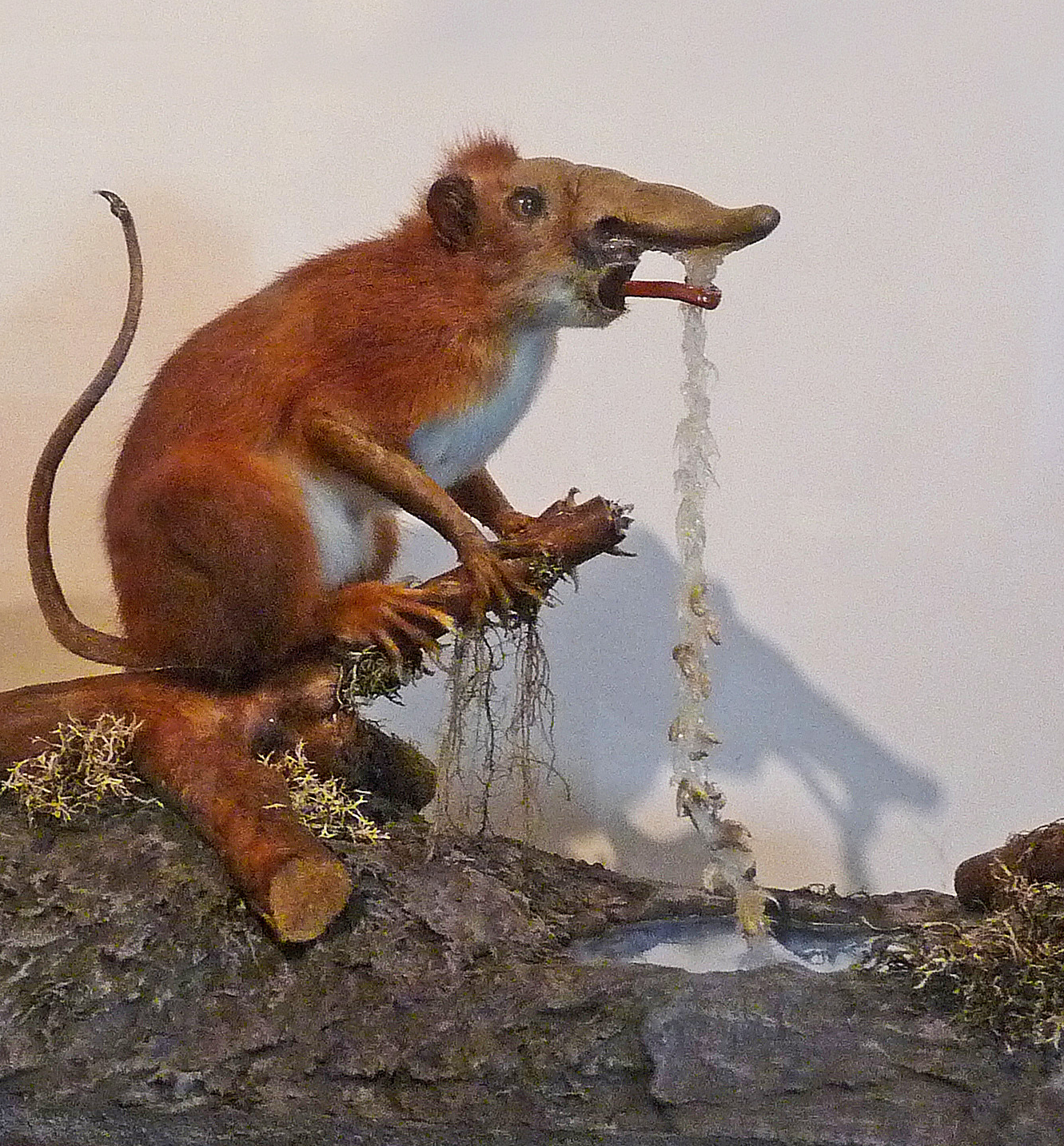
A mock taxidermy of a rhinograde, using its nasorium to catch fish. Rhinogrades, created by Gerolf Steiner in 1957, are one of the earliest concrete examples of speculative zoology.

Speculative evolution is a subgenre of science fiction and an artistic movement focused on hypothetical scenarios in the evolution of life, and a significant form of fictional biology. It is also known as speculative biology and it is referred to as speculative zoology in regards to hypothetical animals. Works incorporating speculative evolution may have entirely conceptual species that evolve on a planet other than Earth, or they may be an alternate history focused on an alternate evolution of terrestrial life. Speculative evolution is often considered hard science fiction because of its strong connection to and basis in science, particularly biology.

Speculative evolution is a long-standing trope within science fiction, often recognized as beginning as such with H. G. Wells's 1895 novel The Time Machine, which featured several imaginary future creatures. Although small-scale speculative faunas were a hallmark of science fiction throughout the 20th century, ideas were only rarely well-developed, with some exceptions such as Stanley Weinbaum's Planetary series, Edgar Rice Burroughs's Barsoom, a fictional rendition of Mars and its ecosystem published through novels from 1912 to 1948, and Amtor, a fictional rendition of Venus and its ecosystem published through novels from 1934 to 1964, and Gerolf Steiner's Rhinogradentia, a fictional order of mammals created in 1957.

The modern speculative evolution movement is generally agreed to have begun with the publication of Dougal Dixon's 1981 book After Man, which explored a fully realized future Earth with a complete ecosystem of over a hundred hypothetical animals. The success of After Man spawned several "sequels" by Dixon, focusing on different alternate and future scenarios. Dixon's work, like most similar works that came after them, were created with real biological principles in mind and were aimed at exploring real life processes, such as evolution and climate change, through the use of fictional examples.

Speculative evolution's possible use as an educational and scientific tool has been noted and discussed through the decades following the publication of After Man. Speculative evolution can be useful in exploring and showcasing patterns present in the present and in the past. By extrapolating past trends into the future, scientists can research and predict the most likely scenarios of how certain organisms and lineages could respond to ecological changes. In some cases, attributes and creatures first imagined within speculative evolution have since been discovered. A filter feeder radiodont was illustrated by artist John Meszaros in the 2013 book All Your Yesterdays by John Conway, C. M. Kosemen and Darren Naish. In the year following publication, a taxonomic study proved the existence of the filter feeding radiodont Tamisiocaris.

== History ==
=== Early works ===
The Time Machine (1895) by H. G. Wells is seen by some as an early instance of speculative evolution and has been cited as an inspiration by later creators within the field.

Explorations of hypothetical worlds featuring future, alternate or alien lifeforms is a long-standing trope in science fiction. One of the earliest works usually recognized as representing one of speculative evolution is H. G. Wells's science fiction novel The Time Machine, published in 1895. The Time Machine, set over eight hundred thousand years in the future, features post-human descendants in the form of the beautiful but weak Eloi and the brutish Morlocks. Further into the future, the protagonist of the book finds large crab-monsters and huge butterflies. Science fiction authors who wrote after Wells often used fictional creatures in the same vein, but most such imaginary faunas were small and not very developed.

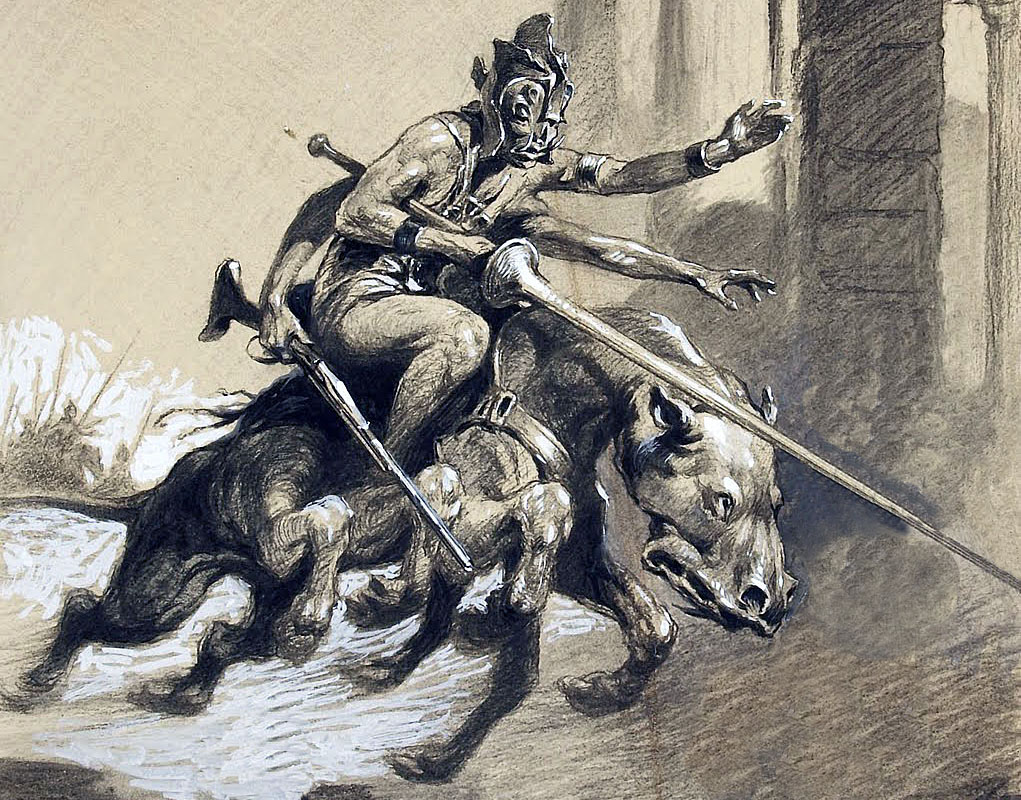
A four-armed "Green Martian" riding a "thoat" from Edgar Rice Burroughs's Barsoom, a fictional version of the planet Mars. Illustration by James Allen St. John (1920).

Edgar Rice Burroughs, who wrote in the early 20th century, can like Wells be considered an early speculative evolution author. Although his fictional ecosystems were still relatively small in scope, they were the settings of many of his novels and as such quite well-developed. In particular, Burroughs's Barsoom, a fictional version of the planet Mars which appeared in ten novels published from 1912 to 1948, featured a Martian ecosystem with a variety of alien creatures and several distinct Martian cultures and ethnic groups, as well as Amtor, a fictional version of the planet Venus which appeared in five novels published from 1934 to 1964, also featured a Venusian ecosystem with a variety of alien creatures and several distinct Venusian cultures and ethnic groups. Stanley Weinbaum's Planetary series also includes significantly conceptualized and developed alien life. Frederik Pohl wrote that before Weinbaum, science fiction's aliens "might be catmen, lizard-men, antmen, plantmen or rockmen; but they were, always and incurably, men. Weinbaum changed that. ... it was the difference in orientation – in drives, goals and thought processes – that made the Weinbaum-type alien so fresh and rewarding in science fiction in the mid-thirties."

In 1930, Olaf Stapledon published a "future history", Last and First Men: A Story of the Near and Far Future, describing the history of humanity from the present onwards, across two billion years and eighteen human species, of which Homo sapiens is the first. Besides conventional environment-driven evolution -during which offshoots of humanity experienced both elevated and the total loss of sentience - the book anticipates the science of genetic engineering, and is an early instance of the fictional group mind idea. Published in 1957, German zoologist Gerolf Steiner's book Bau und Leben der Rhinogradentia (translated into English as The Snouters: The Form and Life of the Rhinogrades) described the fictional evolution, biology and behavior of an imaginary order of mammals, the Rhinogradentia or "rhinogrades". The Rhinogrades are characterized by a nose-like feature called a "nasorium", the form and function of which vary significantly between species, akin to Darwin's finches and their beak specialization. This diverse group of fictional animals inhabits a series of islands in which they have gradually evolved, radiating into most ecological niches. Satirical papers have been published continuing Steiner's imagined world. Although the work does feature an entire speculative ecosystem, its impact is dwarfed by the later works due to its limited scope, only exploring the life of an island archipelago.

In 1976, the Italian author and illustrator Leo Lionni published Parallel Botany, a "field guide to imaginary plants", presented with academic-style mentions of genuine people and places. Parallel Botany has been compared to the 1972 book Invisible Cities by Italo Calvino, in which Marco Polo in a dialogue with Kublai Khan describes 55 cities, which, like Lionni's "parallel" plants, are "only as real as the mind's ability to conceptualize them".

=== Movement ===
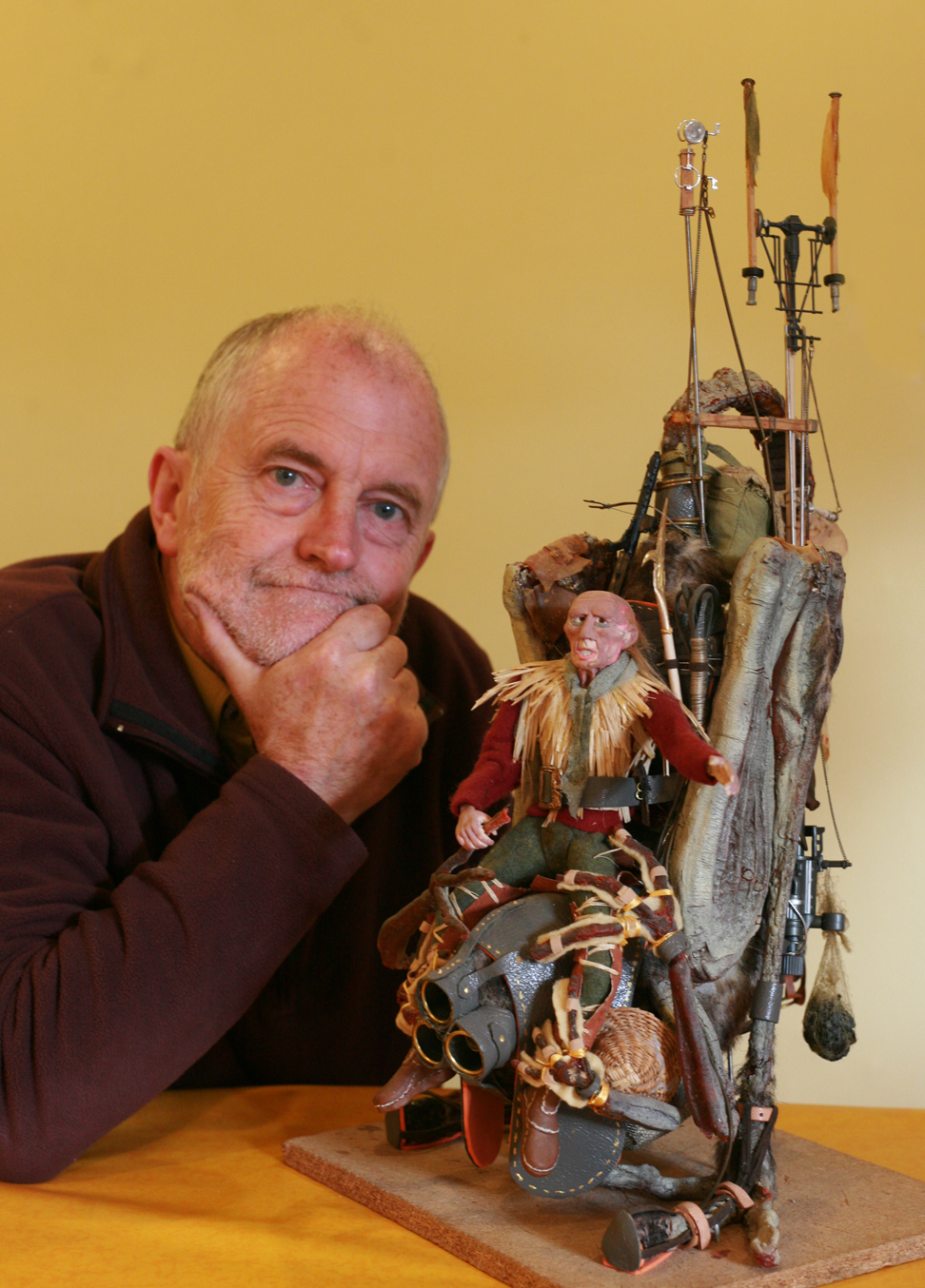
Author Dougal Dixon with a model of a "Strida", one of the creatures featured in his 2010 book Greenworld.

One of the significant "founding" works of speculative evolution is After Man by Dougal Dixon, published in 1981. To this day, After Man is recognized as the first truly large-scale speculative evolution project involving a whole world and a vast array of species. Furthering its significance is the fact that the book was made very accessible by being published by mainstream publishers and being fully illustrated with color images. As such, After Man is often seen as having firmly established the idea of creating entire speculative worlds. Through the decades following After Man's publication, Dixon remained one of the sole authors of speculative evolution, publishing two more books in the same vein as After Man; The New Dinosaurs in 1988 and Man After Man in 1990. Dixon cited The Time Machine as his primary inspiration, being unaware of Steiner's work, and devised After Man as a popular-level book on the processes of evolution that instead of using the past to tell the story projected the processes into the future. A central idea of After Man, besides a wave of extinction following humans, is convergent evolution as new species bear a close resemblance to their unrelated predecessors.

When designing the various animals of the book, Dixon looked at the different types of biomes on the planet and what adaptations animals living there have, designing new animals descended from modern day ones with the same set of adaptations. The success of After Man inspired Dixon to continue writing books that explained factual scientific processes through fictional examples. The New Dinosaurs was in essence a book about zoogeography, something the general public would be unfamiliar with, using a world in which the non-avian dinosaurs had not gone extinct. Man After Man, explored climate change over the course of the next few million years by showcasing its effects through the eyes of future human descendants.

Today, many artists and writers work on speculative evolution projects online, often in the same vein as Dixon's works. Speculative evolution continues to endure a somewhat mainstream presence through films and TV shows featuring hypothetical and imaginary creatures, such as The Future is Wild (2002), Extraterrestrial/Alien Worlds (2005) Primeval (2007–2011), Avatar (2009), Terra Nova (2011), and Alien Worlds (2020). The modern explosion of speculative evolution has been termed by British paleontologist Darren Naish as the "Speculative Zoology Movement".

== As an educational and scientific tool ==
Reconstruction of frontal appendage of Tamisiocaris, a radiodont from the Cambrian which was discovered to have been a filter-feeder in 2014. A hypothetical filter-feeding radiodont was featured in the book All Your Yesterdays (2013).

Although primarily characterized as entertainment, speculative evolution can be used as educational tool to explain and illustrate real natural processes through using fictional and imaginary examples. The worlds created are often built on ecological and biological principles inferred from the real evolutionary history of life on Earth and readers can learn from them as such. For example, all of Dixon's speculative works are aimed at exploring real processes, with After Man exploring evolution, The New Dinosaurs zoogeography and both Man After Man and Greenworld (2010) exploring climate change, offering an environmental message.

In some cases, speculative evolution artists have successfully predicted the existence of organisms that were later discovered to resemble something real. Many of the animals featured in Dixon's After Man are still considered plausible ideas, with some of them (such as specialized rodents and semi-aquatic primates) being reinforced with recent biology studies. A creature dubbed "Ceticaris", conceived by artist John Meszaros as a filter-feeding radiodont, was published in the 2013 book All Your Yesterdays, and in 2014, the actual Cambrian radiodont Tamisiocaris was discovered to have been a filter-feeder. In honor of Meszaros's prediction, Tamisiocaris was included in a new clade named the Cetiocaridae.

Dougal Dixon's The New Dinosaurs was heavily influenced by paleontological ideas developing during its time, such as the ongoing dinosaur renaissance, and as such many of the dinosaurs in the book are energetic and active creatures rather than sluggish and lumbering. Dixon extrapolated on the ideas of paleontologists such as Robert Bakker and Gregory S. Paul when creating his creatures and also used patterns seen in the actual evolutionary history of the dinosaurs and pushing them to an extreme. Perhaps because of this, many of the animals in the book are similar to actual Mesozoic animals that were later discovered. Many of the dinosaurs in it are feathered, something not widely accepted at the time of its publication but seen as likely today. Similarly, After Man in 1981 represents a sort of time capsule of geological thought before global warming was fully discerned, but Dixon also portrays a sixth mass extinction or Anthropocene before it was commonplace to do so.

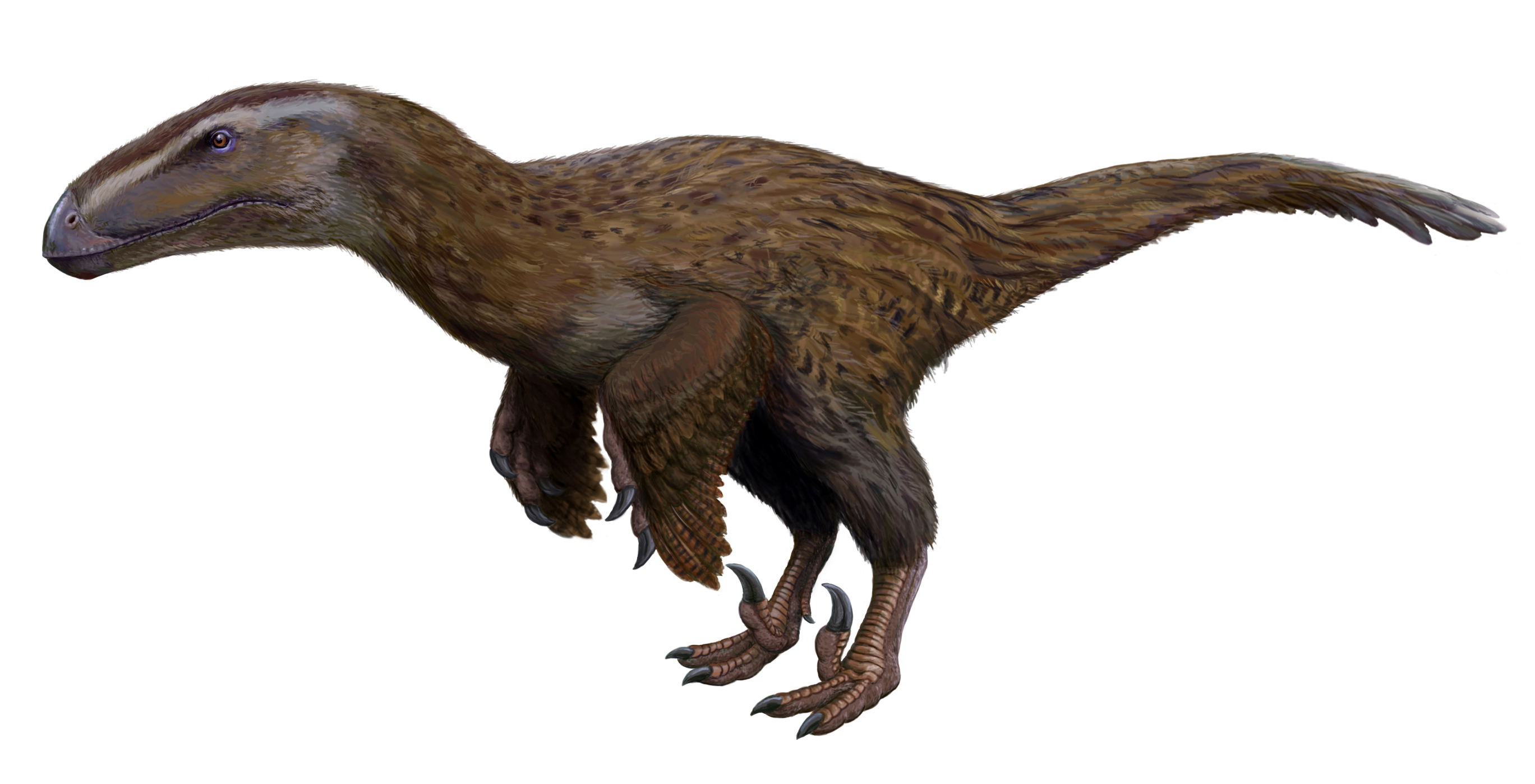
Hypothetical restoration of Dromaeosauroides bornholmensis, which is known from two teeth. Its appearance is inferred from related genera.

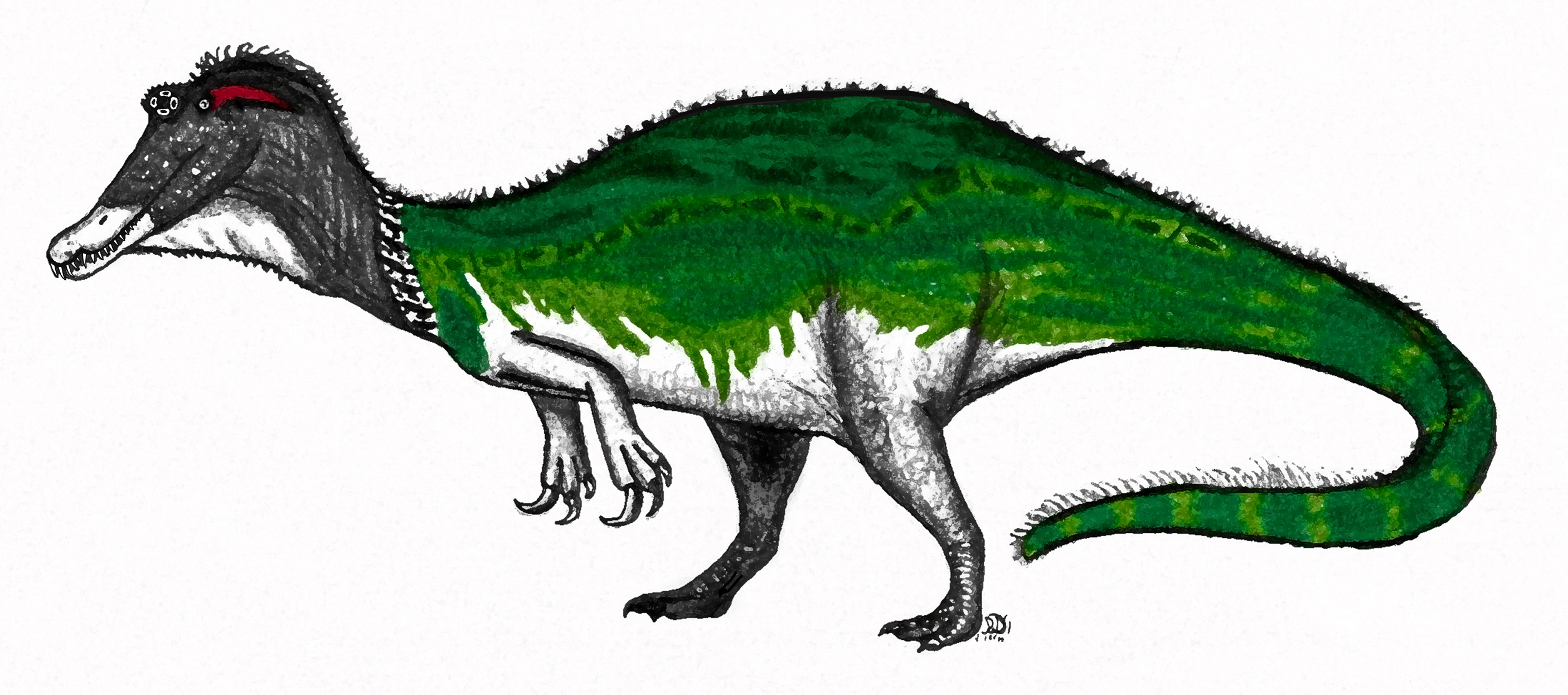
Speculative reconstruction of Sinopliosaurus fusuiensis with generalized spinosaurid morphology, and unique coloration pattern.

Speculative evolution can be useful in exploring and showcasing patterns present in the present and in the past, and there is a useful aspect to hypothesizing on the form of future and alien life. By extrapolating past trends into the future, scientists could research and predict the most likely scenarios of how certain organisms and lineages could respond to ecological changes. As such, speculative evolution facilitates authors and artists to develop realistic hypotheses of the future. In some scientific fields, speculation is essential in understanding what is being studied. Paleontologists apply their own understanding of natural processes and biology to understand the appearances and lifestyles of extinct organisms that are discovered, varying in how far their speculation goes. For instance, All Yesterdays and its sequel All Your Yesterdays (2017) explores highly speculative renditions of real (and in some cases hypothetical) prehistoric animals that do not explicitly contradict any of the recovered fossil material. The speculation undertaken for All Yesterdays and its sequel has been compared to that of Dixon's speculative evolution works, though its objective was to challenge modern conservative perceptions and ideas of how dinosaurs and other prehistoric creatures lived, rather than designing whole new ecosystems. The books have inspired a modern artistic movement of artists going beyond conventional paleoart tropes, expanding into increasingly speculative renditions of prehistoric life.

Additionally, the evolutionary history of fictional organisms has been used as a tool in biology education. Caminalcules, named after Joseph H. Camin, are a group of animal-like lifeforms, consisting of 77 purported extant and fossil species that were invented as a tool for understanding phylogenetics. The classification of Caminalcules, as well as other fictional creatures such as dragons and aliens, have been used as analogies to teach concepts in evolution and systematics.

Speculative evolution is sometimes presented in museum exhibitions. For instance, both After Man and The Future is Wild has been presented in exhibition form, educating museum visitors on the principles of biology and evolution through using their own fictional future creatures.

== Subsets ==
=== Extraterrestrial life ===
A popular subset of speculative evolution is the exploration of possible realistic extraterrestrial life and ecosystems. Speculative evolution writings focusing on extraterrestrial life, like the blog Furahan Biology, use realistic scientific principles to describe the biomechanics of hypothetical alien life. Although commonly identified with terms such as "astrobiology", "xenobiology" or "exobiology", these terms designate actual scientific fields. Though 20th century work in exobiology sometimes formulated "audacious" ideas about extraterrestrial forms of life. Astrophysicists Carl Sagan and Edwin Salpeter speculated that a "hunters, floaters and sinkers" ecosystem could populate the atmospheres of gas giant planets like Jupiter, and scientifically described it in a 1976 paper.

In extraterrestrial-focused speculative biology, lifeforms are often designed with the intention to populate planets wildly different from Earth, and in such cases concerns like chemistry, astronomy and the laws of physics become just as important to consider as the usual biological principles. Very exotic environments of physical extremes may be explored in such scenarios. For example, Robert Forward's 1980 Dragon's Egg develops a tale of life on a neutron star, and the resulting high-gravity, high-energy environment with an atmosphere of iron vapor and mountains 5-100 millimeters high. Once the star cools down and stable chemistry develops, life evolves extremely quickly, and Forward imagines a civilization of "cheela" that lives a million times faster than humans.

In some cases, artists and writers exploring possible alien life conjure similar ideas independent of each other, often attributed to studying the same biological processes and ideas. Such occasions can be called "convergent speculation", similar to the scientific idea of convergent evolution.

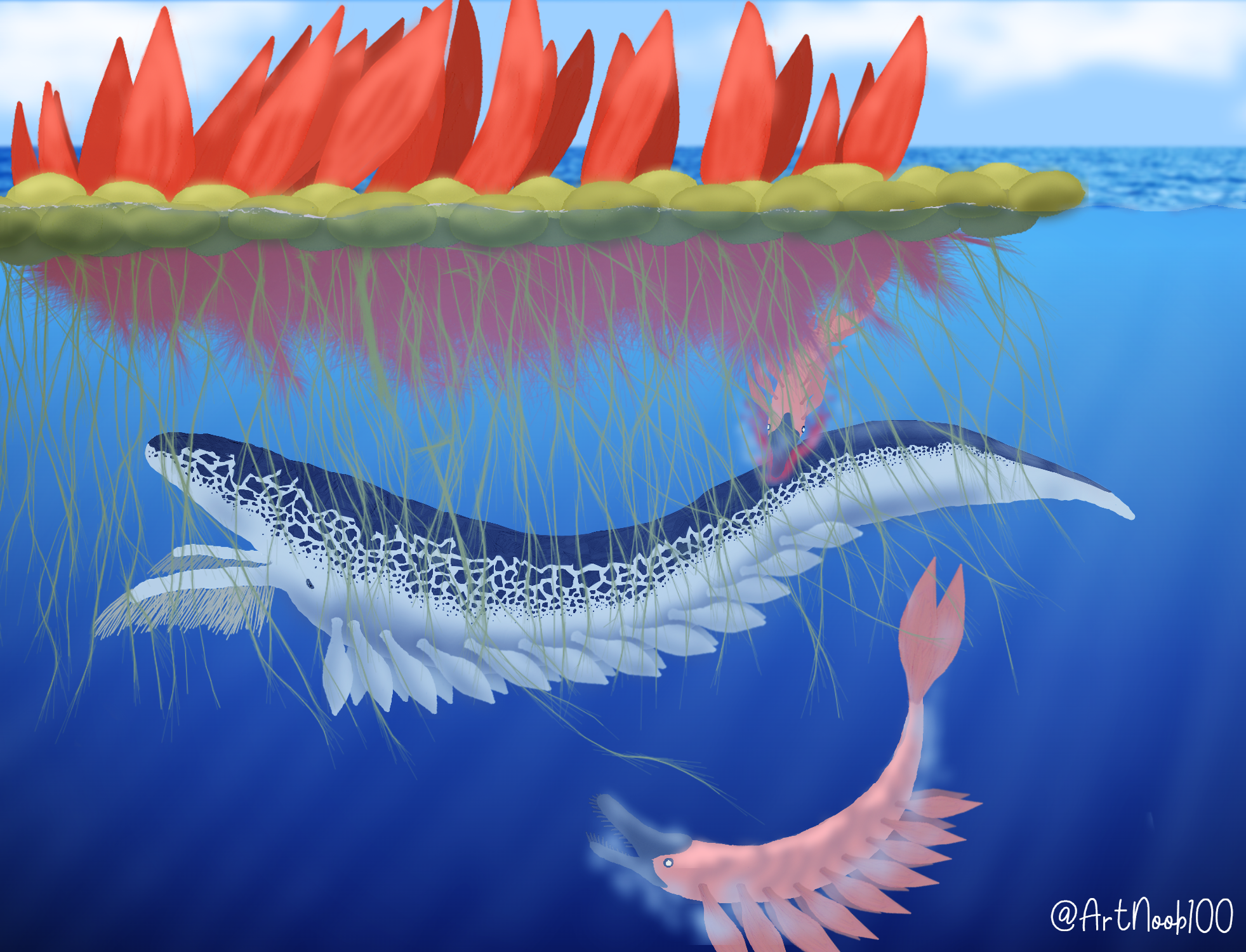
Tytge Sea Leviathan (the creature in the center), from the sci-fi franchise Infinity Horizon.

Perhaps the most famous speculative work on a hypothetical alien ecosystem is Wayne Barlowe's 1990 book Expedition, which explores the fictional exoplanet Darwin IV. Expedition was written as a report of a 24th-century expedition that had been led to the planet by a team composed of both humans and intelligent aliens and used paintings and descriptive texts to create and describe a fully realized extraterrestrial ecosystem. Barlowe later served as an executive producer of a TV adaptation of the book, Alien Planet (2005) where exploration of Darwin IV is instead carried out by robotic probes and the segments detailing the ecosystems of the planet are intercut with interviews with scientists, such as Michio Kaku, Jack Horner and James B. Garvin.

Other examples of speculative evolution focused on extraterrestrial life include Dougal Dixon's 2010 book Greenworld, TV programmes such as 1997 the BBC2/Discovery Channel special Natural History of an Alien and the 2005 Channel 4/National Geographic programme Extraterrestrial as well as a variety of personal web-based artistic projects, such as C. M. Kosemen's "Snaiad" and Gert van Dijk's "Furaha", and collaborative web-based projects like "Sagan 4", envisioning the biosphere of entire alien worlds.

Through science fiction, the speculative biology of extraterrestrial organisms has a strong presence in popular culture. The eponymous monster of Alien (1979), particularly its life cycle from egg to parasitoid larva to 'Xenomorph', is thought to be based on the real habits of parasitoid wasps in biology. Further, H. R. Giger's design of the Alien incorporated the features of insects, echinoderms and fossil crinoids, while concept artist John Cobb suggested acid blood as a biological defense mechanism. James Cameron's 2009 film Avatar constructed a fictional biosphere full of original, speculative alien species; a team of experts ensured that the lifeforms were scientifically plausible. The creatures of the movie took inspiration from Earth species as diverse as pterosaurs, microraptors, great white sharks, wolves, coyotes, and panthers, and combined their traits to create an alien world. Darren Naish praised the creature design of 2022's Avatar: The Way of Water as well, admitting suspension of disbelief on the humanoid Na'vi protagonists. He notes the other creatures, aliens and their anatomies and lifestyles are inspired by evolution and ecology to a significant degree, with probable inspirations such as mycorrhizal fungi, marine reptiles, and simian evolution. According to Naish, "the series will be a mainstay in discussions about creature design and speculative biology for some time yet."There has been an increase lately (2026) in astrobiological speculative projects, possibly in part due to the Alien Biospheres series on Youtube. A major challenge of exobiology is deviating from Earth biology so as to not copy terrestrial evolution.

=== Alternative evolution ===
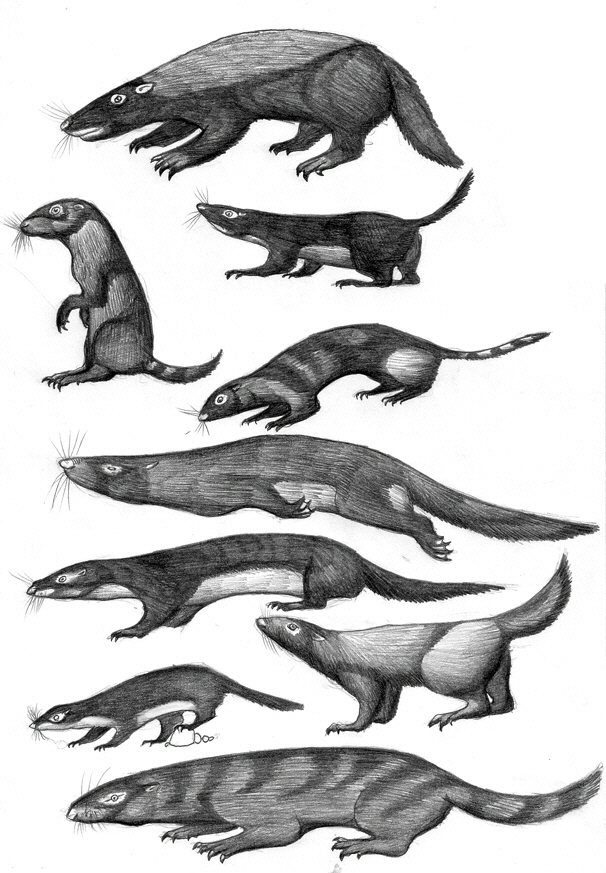
Speculative zoology can examine sometimes overlooked prehistoric animals in an evolutionary context. The Speculative Dinosaur Project focused as much on mammals, squamates, and crocodylomorphs as on dinosaurs. Pictured are metatherian marsupials that have converged on our universe's mustelids.

Similar to alternate history, alternative evolution is the exploration of possible alternate scenarios that could have played out in the Earth's past to give rise to alternate lifeforms and ecosystems, popularly the survival of non-avian dinosaurs to the present day. As humanity is often not a part of the worlds envisioned through alternative evolution, it has sometimes been characterized as non-anthropocentric.

Although dinosaurs surviving to the age of humans has been adapted as a plot point in numerous science fiction stories since at least 1912, beginning with Arthur Conan Doyle's The Lost World, the idea of exploring the fully fledged alternate ecosystems that would develop in such a scenario truly began with the publication of Dixon's The New Dinosaurs in 1988, in which dinosaurs were not some lone stragglers of known species that had survived more or less unchanged for the last 66 million years, but diverse animals that had continued to evolve beyond the Cretaceous. In the vein of Dixon's The New Dinosaurs imagination, a now largely defunct, but creatively significant collaborative online project the Speculative Dinosaur Project followed in the same zoological worldbuilding tradition.

Since 1988, alternative evolution has sometimes been applied in popular culture. The creatures in the 2005 film King Kong were fictitious descendants of real animals, with Skull Island being inhabited by dinosaurs and other prehistoric fauna. Inspired by Dougal Dixon's works, the designers imagined what 65 million years or more of isolated evolution might have done to dinosaurs. Concept art for the film was published in the book The World of Kong: A Natural History of Skull Island (2005), which explored the world of the film from a biological perspective, envisioning Skull Island as a surviving fragment of ancient Gondwana. Prehistoric creatures on a declining, eroding island had evolved into "a menagerie of nightmares".

A hypothetical natural history of dragons is a popular subject of speculative zoology, being explored in works such as Peter Dickinson's The Flight of Dragons (1979), the 2004 mockumentary The Last Dragon and the Dragonology series of books.

=== Future evolution ===
The evolution of organisms in the Earth's future is a popular subset of speculative evolution. A relatively common theme in future evolution is civilizational collapse and/or humans becoming extinct due to an anthropogenic extinction event caused by environmental degradation. After such a mass extinction event, the remaining fauna and flora evolve into a variety of new forms. Although the foundations of this subset were laid by Wells's The Time Machine already in 1895, it is generally agreed that it was definitively established by Dixon's After Man in 1981, which explored a fully realized future ecosystem set 50 million years from the present. Dixon's third work on speculative evolution, Man After Man (1990) is also an example of future evolution, this time exploring an imagined future evolutionary path of humanity.

Peter Ward's Future Evolution (2001) makes a scientifically accurate approach to the prediction of patterns of evolution in the future. Ward compares his predictions with those of Dixon and Wells. He tries to understand the mechanism of mass extinctions and the principles of recovery of ecosystems. A key point is that "champion supertaxa" who diversify and speciate at a greater rate, will inherit the world after mass extinctions. Ward quotes the paleontologist Simon Conway Morris, who points out that the fantastical or even whimsical creatures devised by Dougal Dixon, echo nature's tendency to converge on the same body plans. While Ward calls Dixon's visions "semi-whimsical" and compares them to Wells's initial visions in The Time Machine, he nonetheless continues the use of analogous evolution, which is a larger trend in speculative zoology.

Future evolution has also been explored on TV, with the mockumentary series The Future is Wild in 2002, for which Dixon was a consultant (and author of the companion book), and the series Primeval (2007–2011), a drama series in which imagined future animals occasionally appeared. Ideas of future evolution are also frequently explored in science fiction novels, such as in Kurt Vonnegut's 1985 science fiction novel Galápagos, which imagines the evolution of a small surviving group of humans into a sea lion-like species. Stephen Baxter's 2002 science fiction novel Evolution follows 565 million years of human evolution, from shrewlike mammals 65 million years in the past to the ultimate fate of humanity (and its descendants, both biological and non-biological) 500 million years in the future. C. M. Kösemen’s 2006 All Tomorrows similarly explores the future evolution of humanity. Speculative biology and the future evolution of the human species are significant in bio art.

=== Seed worlds ===
Seed worlds, or seeded worlds, are another popular subset of the genre. It involves a terraformed planet or a habitable, yet uninhabited planet being "seeded" by already existing species of animals, plants and fungi, which will speciate in order to fill the different niches by adaptive radiation. The focus can be on one or multiple species, but usually more taxa are present on the project's planet, that won't be covered in as much detail.

One of the most well-known works in this category is Serina: A Natural History of the World of Birds by Dylan Bajda, in which the focal species is the domestic canary, Serinus canaria domestica, who is the progenitor of all other bird species that come later. A minor species that later becomes more relevant is the guppy (Poecilia), whose descendants become terrestrial tripods and compete against the birds after a severe mass extinction which killed 99% of all species on the moon.

== See also ==
- Astrobiology – the interdisciplinary study of the possibility of life elsewhere in the universe.
- Bestiary – popular in the Middle Ages, bestiaries combined descriptions of real animals with descriptions of fantastical ones, sometimes likened to speculative biology.
- Contingency (evolutionary biology) – the scientific study of evolutionary outcomes differing due to differences in history.
- Future history – imagined future historical events and predictions.
- Global catastrophic risk and Human extinction – often tends to precede works featuring hypothetical animals that could one day inhabit Earth in the distant future.
- Hypothetical types of biochemistry – hypothesized life based on molecules other than carbon.
- Paleoart – artwork reconstructing prehistoric animals, often seen as closely related to speculative biology given the inherent speculation required to reconstruct long-dead organisms.
