= The New Dinosaurs =

Book by Dougal Dixon

The New Dinosaurs An Alternative Evolution
- First Edition cover. The cover depicts the Cutlasstooth (Caedosaurus gladiadens), a coelurosaur (Note: The Cutlasstooth is identified as a "coelurid" in the original 1988 text (p. 12). The 2025 edition alters it to be a highly derived ornithomimid (p. 74).) apex predator from South America.
- Author: Dougal Dixon
- Language: English
- Genre: Speculative evolution
- Publisher: Grafton (UK); Salem House (US)
- Publication date: 1988
- Publication place: United Kingdom
- Media type: Print (hardback and paperback)
- Pages: 120
- ISBN: 978-0881623017

The New Dinosaurs: An Alternative Evolution is a 1988 speculative evolution book written by Scottish geologist and palaeontologist Dougal Dixon and illustrated by several illustrators including Amanda Barlow, Peter Barrett, John Butler, Jeane Colville, Anthony Duke, Andy Farmer, Lee Gibbons, Steve Holden, Philip Hood, Martin Knowelden, Sean Milne, Denys Ovenden and Joyce Tuhill. The book also features a foreword by Desmond Morris. The New Dinosaurs explores a hypothetical alternate Earth, complete with animals and ecosystems, where the Cretaceous-Paleogene extinction event never occurred, leaving non-avian dinosaurs and other Mesozoic animals an additional 66 million years to evolve and adapt over the course of the Cenozoic to the present day.

The New Dinosaurs is Dixon's second work on speculative evolution, following After Man (1981). Like After Man, The New Dinosaurs uses its own fictional setting and hypothetical wildlife to explain natural processes with fictitious examples, in this case the concept of zoogeography and biogeographic realms. It was followed by another speculative evolution work by Dixon in 1990, Man After Man.

Although criticised by some palaeontologists upon its release, several of Dixon's hypothetical dinosaurs bear a coincidental resemblance in both appearance and behaviour to dinosaurs that were discovered after the book's publication. As a general example, many of the fictional dinosaurs are depicted with feathers, something that was not yet widely accepted when the book was written.

== Summary ==
The New Dinosaurs utilizes the imagined present-day descendants of Cretaceous animals to explain biogeographic realms.

The New Dinosaurs explores an imagined alternate version of the present-day Earth as Dixon imagines it would have been if the Cretaceous-Paleogene extinction event had never occurred. As in Dixon's previous work, After Man, ecology and evolutionary theory are applied to create believable creatures, all of which have their own binomial names and text describing their behaviour and interactions with other contemporary animals. Most of these animals represent surviving dinosaurs, pterosaurs and plesiosaurs, which Dixon discusses through biogeographic realms, divisions of the Earth's land surface based on distributional patterns of animals and other lifeforms.

In total, about sixty animals are described in the book, about half of the amount featured in After Man, with examples including a widespread group of tree-climbing coelurosaurian theropods called "arbrosaurs", huge striding and terrestrial pterosaurs such as the giraffe-like "lank", colonial pachycephalosaurs, descendants of the Mesozoic hadrosaurs called "sprintosaurs" adapted to a new lifestyle on the grass-covered plains of North America, amphibious hypsilophodonts, flamingo-like coelurosaurs and iguanodonts capable of jumping like kangaroos. In the far north, large migratory birds such as the "tromble" with legs almost like tree trunks, roam the land.

In terms of predators, the coelurosaurs dominate in terms of number and diversity, often having unique adaptations. For instance, the apex predator of the South American pampas, the coelurosaurian "cutlasstooth", has evolved huge, cutting teeth to allow it to prey upon large sauropods. The pampas is also home to the last of the tyrannosaurids, the large scavenging "gourmand". There are also various dromaeosaurids, including the "jinx", adapted to mimic larger herbivorous dinosaurs through scent and appearance.

The world's oceans are home to various pterosaurs, such as seagull-like and penguin-like forms. There is also the "whulk", a massive whale-like pliosaur that feeds exclusively on plankton. The "kraken", an enormous ammonite, uses specialized tentacles to entangle and sting anything that comes near it.

== Development ==
Following the success of his previous speculative evolution book After Man in 1981, Dixon realized that there was a market for popular-level books which use fictional examples and settings to explain actual factual scientific processes. After Man had explained the process of evolution by creating a complex hypothetical future ecosystem, The New Dinosaurs was instead aimed at creating a book on zoogeography, a subject the general public was quite unfamiliar with, by using a fictional world in which the non-avian dinosaurs had not gone extinct to explain the process.

Dixon envisioned dinosaurs as undergoing more change during the last 65 million years than they had during their previous 130 million years of existence due to more dramatic changes in climate and the continents being further separated during the Cenozoic than they were in the Mesozoic. The dinosaurs and other animals in The New Dinosaurs were heavily influenced by the paleontology of its time. The ideas of the Dinosaur Renaissance – replacing the older ideas of dinosaurs as dumb and slow creatures with active, agile and bird-like animals – are heavily used in the book. Dixon extrapolated on the ideas of paleontologists such as Robert Bakker and Gregory S. Paul when creating his creatures and also used patterns seen in the actual evolutionary history of the dinosaurs and pushing them to an extreme, such as with the creation of the "gourmand", an armless and massive scavenger descended from the tyrannosaurids.

The animals in The New Dinosaurs can be more or less divided into animals that have convergently evolved to resemble real modern animals (for instance animals reminiscent of giraffes and kangaroos) and animals that are completely new. Dixon decided not to have any dinosaurs achieve human levels of intelligence (i.e. "dinosauroids") in The New Dinosaurs due to intelligence not having "[proven] itself as a feature that has any evolutionary advantage at all".

=== Later editions ===
According to Dixon's own website, "Dinosaur science has moved on since first publication in 1988, and the original introduction of the book has aged considerably." In the 2010s, Dixon worked to revise and update this information for more recent international editions of The New Dinosaurs.

In August 2025, Breakdown Press published a new edition of The New Dinosaurs. The new edition features heavily revised introductory sections on evolution and Mesozoic life in order to reflect advancements in science since 1988. The cladistic placement and ancestry of several of the animals were also altered to fit with a more modern understanding of dinosaur relationships, behavior, and evolution. As an example, the new edition assigns several animals identified merely as "coelurosaurs" in the original book to specific groups and families. Another example is that the 2025 The New Dinosaurs has tyrannosaurs go completely extinct in the mid-Cenozoic, and presents the scavenging "gourmand" in South America as an abelisaur rather than a tyrannosaur.

== Reception ==
The New Dinosaurs became a bestseller upon its release and like its predecessor After Man, The New Dinosaurs garnered positive reviews from critics. William F. Allman, writing for the U.S. News & World Report, praised the fact that Dixon had extrapolated his designs from real dinosaur ancestors and concluded that although whimsical at times, most dinosaur researchers would agree with the book insofar that had the asteroid that brought their extinction not hit the planet, dinosaurs would probably dominate the planet to this day. Reviews in Smithsonian, School Library Journal and Booklist were also positive, with reviewers calling the book an "alternative history of the world" and a "quintessential 'what if' book for dinosaur enthusiasts".

== Paleontological accuracy ==
=== Initial response ===
Upon the release of The New Dinosaurs, many of the animals featured were criticized by paleontologists and science writers, particularly in that so many of the animals are entirely convergent with actual modern-day animals. In this capacity, the "lank", a four-legged, terrestrial and grazing pterosaur derived from the Cretaceous family Azhdarchidae, has been seen by some writers as perhaps the worst offender. In a 1990 review of the book, researcher Gregory S. Paul called the creature "perhaps the worst beast in the book" and "unbelievable", pointing out that he thought it was infeasible that pterosaurs would evolve into giraffe-like animals before the more dominant and already terrestrial dinosaurs. In 1992, researcher David Unwin echoed the same sentiment, viewing four-legged and grass-eating pterosaurs as highly unlikely.

=== Later assessment and legacy ===
In 2008, British paleontologist and science writer Darren Naish offered a more redeeming look at the Lank, pointing out that if pterosaurs were to become terrestrial, azhdarchids were the most likely group to do so and that azhdarchids would have used a gait similar to that of giraffes when walking. Paul, Unwin and Naish all pointed out that the sheer diversity seen in pterosaurs within the book is somewhat unlikely as the group was low in diversity at the point of the Cretaceous-Paleogene extinction event, the azhdarchids being the only living group. Paul even went on to state that he considered pterosaurs surviving into the Cenozoic "doubtful" even if the extinction event had not happened.

Many of the hypothetical animals created for The New Dinosaurs resemble actual Mesozoic creatures that have since been discovered, both in appearance and in behaviour. Many of the hypothetical dinosaurs featured in the book are covered in fuzzy integument, which in modern times have been discovered in dinosaurs of most groups. The tree-climbing arbrosaurs are similar to actual tree-climbing small theropods such as Microraptor (described in 2000) and the large terrestrial pterosaurs, such as the aforementioned "lank", resemble some animals in the actual pterosaur group Azhdarchidae. Further examples include the ant-eating "pangaloon" (which resembles some later discovered alvarezsaurids) and the tree-climbing "nauger" with elongated fingers (which resembles Scansoriopteryx). Further ideas presented in the book that had little to no evidence in the 1980s but has since been found in the fossil record include semi-aquatic dinosaurs, arctic dinosaurs, and dinosaurs subjected to insular dwarfism.

There have also been many paleontological developments since 1988 that The New Dinosaurs did not predict, especially in regard to the diversity of certain clades at the end of the Cretaceous. The book gives little attention to crocodylomorphs, birds, squamates, and mammals, groups now known to have been highly diverse already 66 million years ago. As an example, mammals in The New Dinosaurs never evolved digging, tree-living, or gliding forms and are represented in the book by a single insectivore, the "zwim". Mammals have since 1988 been discovered to have been digging, gliding, and living in trees since at least the Late Jurassic. Several prominent dinosaur groups were also not known in 1988 (for instance scansoriopterygids and alvarezsaurs) or known only partially (such as rebbachisaurs and therizinosaurs). The artwork in The New Dinosaurs shows most dinosaurs with skinny tails and vaguely mammalian rear ends, whereas later research demonstrated that almost all dinosaurs had thick tails with caudofemoralis muscles.

== Adaptation and influence ==
In 2008, The New Dinosaurs was adapted into a Japanese manga series by Tokyo-based company Diamond. Peter Jackson's 2005 film King Kong featured a complete ecosystem on the film's version of Skull Island populated with descendants of Mesozoic animals. The designers of these animals (Weta Workshop) were inspired by Dixon's works, in particular The New Dinosaurs.
