= Human extinction =

End of the human species

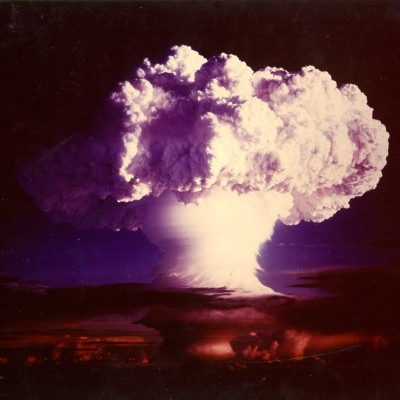
Nuclear war is an often predicted cause of the extinction of humankind.

Human extinction, or omnicide, refers to the possible ending of the human species, either by population decline due to singular natural events—for example, space irradiation, asteroid impact, or large-scale volcanism—or via anthropogenic destruction (self-extinction).

Some of the many possible contributors to anthropogenic hazards are climate change, global nuclear annihilation, biological warfare, weapons of mass destruction, and ecological collapse. Other scenarios center on emerging technologies, such as advanced artificial intelligence, biotechnology, or self-replicating nanobots.

The scientific consensus is that there is a relatively low risk of near-term human extinction due to natural causes. The likelihood of human extinction through humankind's own activities, however, is a current area of research and debate.

== History of thought ==
=== Early history ===
Before the 18th and 19th centuries, the possibility that humans or other organisms could become extinct was viewed with scepticism. It contradicted the principle of plenitude, a doctrine that all possible things exist. The principle traces back to Aristotle and was an important tenet of Christian theology. Ancient philosophers such as Plato, Aristotle, and Lucretius wrote of the end of humankind only as part of a cycle of renewal. Marcion of Sinope was a proto-Protestant who advocated for antinatalism that could lead to human extinction. Later philosophers such as Al-Ghazali, William of Ockham, and Gerolamo Cardano expanded the study of logic and probability and began wondering if abstract worlds existed, including a world without humans. Physicist Edmond Halley stated that the extinction of the human race may be beneficial to the future of the world.

The notion that species can become extinct gained scientific acceptance during the Age of Enlightenment in the 17th and 18th centuries, and by 1800 Georges Cuvier had identified 23 extinct prehistoric species. The doctrine was further gradually bolstered by evidence from the natural sciences, particularly the discovery of fossil evidence of species that appeared to no longer exist and the development of theories of evolution. In On the Origin of Species, Charles Darwin discussed the extinction of species as a natural process and a core component of natural selection. Notably, Darwin was skeptical of the possibility of sudden extinction, viewing it as a gradual process. He held that the abrupt disappearances of species from the fossil record were not evidence of catastrophic extinctions but rather represented unrecognized gaps in the record.

As the possibility of extinction became more widely established in the sciences, so did the prospect of human extinction. In the 19th century, human extinction became a popular topic in science (e.g., Thomas Robert Malthus's An Essay on the Principle of Population) and fiction (e.g., Jean-Baptiste Cousin de Grainville's The Last Man). In 1863, a few years after Darwin published On the Origin of Species, William King proposed that Neanderthals were an extinct species of the genus Homo. The Romantic authors and poets were particularly interested in the topic. Lord Byron wrote about the extinction of life on Earth in his 1816 poem "Darkness," and in 1824 envisaged humanity being threatened by a comet impact and employing a missile system to defend against it. Mary Shelley's 1826 novel The Last Man is set in a world where humanity has been nearly destroyed by a mysterious plague. At the turn of the 20th century, Russian cosmism, a precursor to modern transhumanism, advocated avoiding humanity's extinction by colonizing space.

=== Atomic era ===
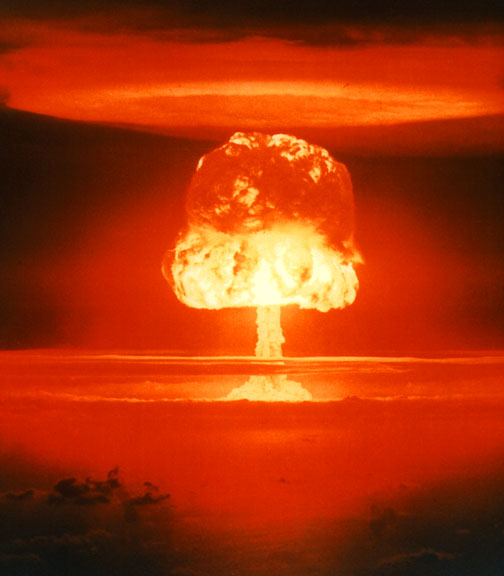
Castle Romeo nuclear test on Bikini Atoll

The invention of the atomic bomb prompted a wave of discussion among scientists, intellectuals, and the public at large about the risk of human extinction. In a 1945 essay, Bertrand Russell stated:

The prospect for the human race is sombre beyond all precedent. Mankind are faced with a clear-cut alternative: either we shall all perish, or we shall have to acquire some slight degree of common sense.

In 1950, Leo Szilard suggested it was technologically feasible to build a cobalt bomb that could render the planet unlivable. A 1950 Gallup poll found that 19% of Americans believed that another world war would mean "an end to mankind." Rachel Carson's 1962 book Silent Spring raised awareness of environmental catastrophe. In 1983, Brandon Carter proposed the Doomsday argument, which used Bayesian probability to predict the total number of humans that will ever exist.

The discovery of "nuclear winter" in the early 1980s, a specific mechanism by which nuclear war could result in human extinction, again raised the issue to prominence. Writing about these findings in 1983, Carl Sagan argued that measuring the severity of extinction solely in terms of those who die "conceals its full impact," and that nuclear war "imperils all of our descendants, for as long as there will be humans."

=== Post-Cold War ===
The end of the Cold War led to an explosion of literature about human extinction. John Leslie's 1996 book The End of the World was an academic treatment of the science and ethics of human extinction. In it, Leslie considered a range of threats to humanity and what they have in common. In 2003, British Astronomer Royal Sir Martin Rees published Our Final Hour, in which he argues that advances in certain technologies create new threats to the survival of humankind and that the 21st century may be a critical moment in history when humanity's fate is decided. Edited by Nick Bostrom and Milan M. Ćirković, Global Catastrophic Risks, published in 2008, is a collection of essays from 26 academics on various global catastrophic and existential risks. Nicholas P. Money's 2019 book The Selfish Ape delves into the environmental consequences of overexploitation. Toby Ord's 2020 book The Precipice argues that preventing existential risks is one of the most important moral issues of our time. The book discusses, quantifies, and compares different existential risks, concluding that the greatest risks are presented by unaligned artificial intelligence and biotechnology. Lyle Lewis' 2024 book Racing to Extinction explores the roots of human extinction from an evolutionary biology perspective. Lewis argues that humanity treats unused natural resources as waste and is driving ecological destruction through overexploitation, habitat loss, and denial of environmental limits. He uses vivid examples, like the extinction of the passenger pigeon and the environmental cost of rice production, to show how interconnected and fragile ecosystems are. Henry Gee's book The Rise and Fall of the Human Empire (2025) argues that humanity is on the brink of extinction due to environmental degradation and diminishing resources.

In 2022, a study led by a group of scientists asked for a new research agenda to figure out the possible catastrophic effects of climate change, such as situations that could kill off 10% of the world's population or even all of humanity. They say that the IPCC should write a report on catastrophic climate change because the effects of extreme warming, like famine, severe weather, war, and disease outbreaks, have not been studied enough. The researchers stress the importance of comprehending potential tipping points and interacting threats to enhance preparedness for worst-case scenarios.

== Probability ==
=== Natural vs. anthropogenic ===
Experts generally agree that anthropogenic existential risks are (much) more likely than natural risks. A key difference between these risk types is that empirical evidence can place an upper bound on the level of natural risk. Humanity has existed for at least 200,000 years, over which it has been subject to a roughly constant level of natural risk. If the natural risk were high enough, humanity would not have survived this long. Based on a formalization of this argument, researchers have concluded that we can be confident that natural risk is lower than 1 in 14,000 per year (equivalent to 1 in 140 per century, on average).

Another empirical method to study the likelihood of certain natural risks is to investigate the geological record. For example, a comet or asteroid impact event sufficient in scale to cause an impact winter that would cause human extinction before the year 2100 has been estimated at one in a million. Moreover, large supervolcano eruptions may cause a volcanic winter that could endanger the survival of humanity. The geological record suggests that supervolcanic eruptions are estimated to occur on average about once every 50,000 years, though most such eruptions would not reach the scale required to cause human extinction. Famously, the supervolcano Mt. Toba may have almost wiped out humanity at the time of its last eruption (though this is contentious).

Since anthropogenic risk is a relatively recent phenomenon, humanity's track record of survival cannot provide similar assurances. Humanity has only existed for 80 years since the creation of nuclear weapons, and there is no historical track record for future technologies. This has led thinkers like Carl Sagan to conclude that humanity is currently in a "time of perils," a uniquely dangerous period in human history, where it is subject to unprecedented levels of risk, beginning from when humans first started posing risk to themselves through their actions. Paleobiologist Olev Vinn has suggested that humans presumably have a number of inherited behavior patterns (IBPs) that are not fine-tuned for conditions prevailing in technological civilization. Some IBPs may be highly incompatible with such conditions and have a high potential to induce self-destruction. These patterns may include responses of individuals seeking power over conspecifics in relation to harvesting and consuming energy. Nonetheless, there are ways to address the issue of inherited behavior patterns.

=== Risk estimates ===
Given the limitations of ordinary observation and modeling, expert elicitation is frequently used instead to obtain probability estimates.

- Humanity has a 95% probability of being extinct in 8,000,000 years, according to J. Richard Gott's formulation of the controversial doomsday argument, which argues that we have probably already lived through half the duration of human history.
- The Global Challenges Foundation's 2016 annual report estimates an annual probability of human extinction of at least 0.05% per year (equivalent to 5% per century, on average).
- As of August 29, 2026, Metaculus users estimate a 2% probability of human extinction by 2100.
- A 2020 study published in ⁣⁣Scientific Reports⁣⁣ warns that if deforestation and resource consumption continue at current rates, these factors could lead to a "catastrophic collapse in human population" and possibly "an irreversible collapse of our civilization" in the next 20 to 40 years. According to the most optimistic scenario provided by the study, the chances that human civilization survives are smaller than 10%. To avoid this collapse, the study says, humanity should pass from a civilization dominated by the economy to a "cultural society" that "privileges the interest of the ecosystem above the individual interest of its components, but eventually in accordance with the overall communal interest."
- Nick Bostrom, a philosopher at the University of Oxford known for his work on existential risk, argues
  - that it would be "misguided" to assume that the probability of near-term extinction is less than 25%, and
  - that it will be "a tall order" for the human race to "get our precautions sufficiently right the first time," given that an existential risk provides no opportunity to learn from failure.
- Philosopher John A. Leslie assigns a 70% chance of humanity surviving the next five centuries, based partly on the controversial philosophical doomsday argument that he champions. Leslie's argument is somewhat frequentist, based on the observation that human extinction has never been observed but requires subjective anthropic arguments. Leslie also discusses the anthropic survivorship bias (which he calls an "observational selection" effect) and states that the a priori certainty of observing an "undisastrous past" could make it difficult to argue that we must be safe because nothing terrible has yet occurred. He quotes Holger Bech Nielsen's formulation: "We do not even know if there should exist some extremely dangerous decay of, say, the proton, which caused the eradication of the earth, because if it happens we would no longer be there to observe it, and if it does not happen there is nothing to observe."
- Jean-Marc Salotti calculated the probability of human extinction caused by a giant asteroid impact. If no planets are colonized, it will be 0.03 to 0.3 for the next billion years. According to that study, the most frightening object is a giant long-period comet with a warning time of only a few years and, therefore, no time for any intervention in space or settlement on the Moon or Mars. The probability of a giant comet impact in the next hundred years is 2.2×10^{−12}.
- As the United Nations Office for Disaster Risk Reduction estimated in 2023, there is a 2 to 14% chance of an extinction-level event by 2100.
- Bill Gates told The Wall Street Journal on January 27, 2025, that he believes there is a 10–15% chance of a natural pandemic hitting in the next four years, but he estimated that there was also a 65–97.5% chance of a natural pandemic hitting in the next 26 years.
- On March 19, 2025, Henry Gee said that humanity will be extinct in the next 10,000 years. To avoid it happening, he wanted all humanity to establish space colonies in the next 200–300 years.
- On September 11, 2025, Warp News estimated a 20% chance of global catastrophe and a 6% chance of human extinction by 2100. They also estimated a 100% chance of global catastrophe and a 30% chance of human extinction by 2500.

==== From nuclear weapons ====
On November 13, 2024, the American Enterprise Institute estimated a probability of nuclear war during the 21st century between 0% and 80%. A 2023 article of The Economist estimated an 8% chance of nuclear war causing global catastrophe and a 0.5625% chance of nuclear war causing human extinction.

==== From supervolcanic eruption ====
On November 13, 2024, the American Enterprise Institute estimated an annual probability of supervolcanic eruption around 0.0067% (0.67% per century on average).

==== From artificial intelligence ====
- A 2008 survey by the Future of Humanity Institute estimated a 5% probability of extinction by superintelligence by 2100.
- A 2016 survey of AI experts found a median estimate of 5% that human-level AI would cause an outcome that was "extremely bad (e.g., human extinction)". In 2019, the risk was lowered to 2%, but in 2022, it was increased back to 5%. In 2023, the risk doubled to 10%. In 2024, the risk increased to 15%.
- In 2020, Toby Ord estimates existential risk in the next century at "1 in 6" in his book The Precipice. He also estimated a "1 in 10" risk of extinction by unaligned AI within the next century.
- According to a July 10, 2023 article of The Economist, scientists estimated a 12% chance of AI-caused catastrophe and a 3% chance of AI-caused extinction by 2100. They also estimated a 100% chance of AI-caused catastrophe and a 25% chance of AI-caused extinction by 2833.
- On December 27, 2024, Geoffrey Hinton estimated a 10–20% probability of AI-caused extinction in the next 30 years. He also estimated a 50–100% probability of AI-caused extinction in the next 150 years.
- On August 1, 2025, Holly Elmore estimated a 15–20% probability of an AI-caused extinction in the next 1–10 years. She also estimated a 75–100% probability of an AI-caused extinction in the next 5–50 years.
- On November 10, 2025, Elon Musk estimated the probability of AI-driven human extinction at 20%, while others—including Bengio's colleagues—placed the risk anywhere between 10% and 90%. In other words, Elon Musk and Yoshua Bengio's colleagues estimated a 20–50% probability of an AI-caused extinction.

==== From climate change ====
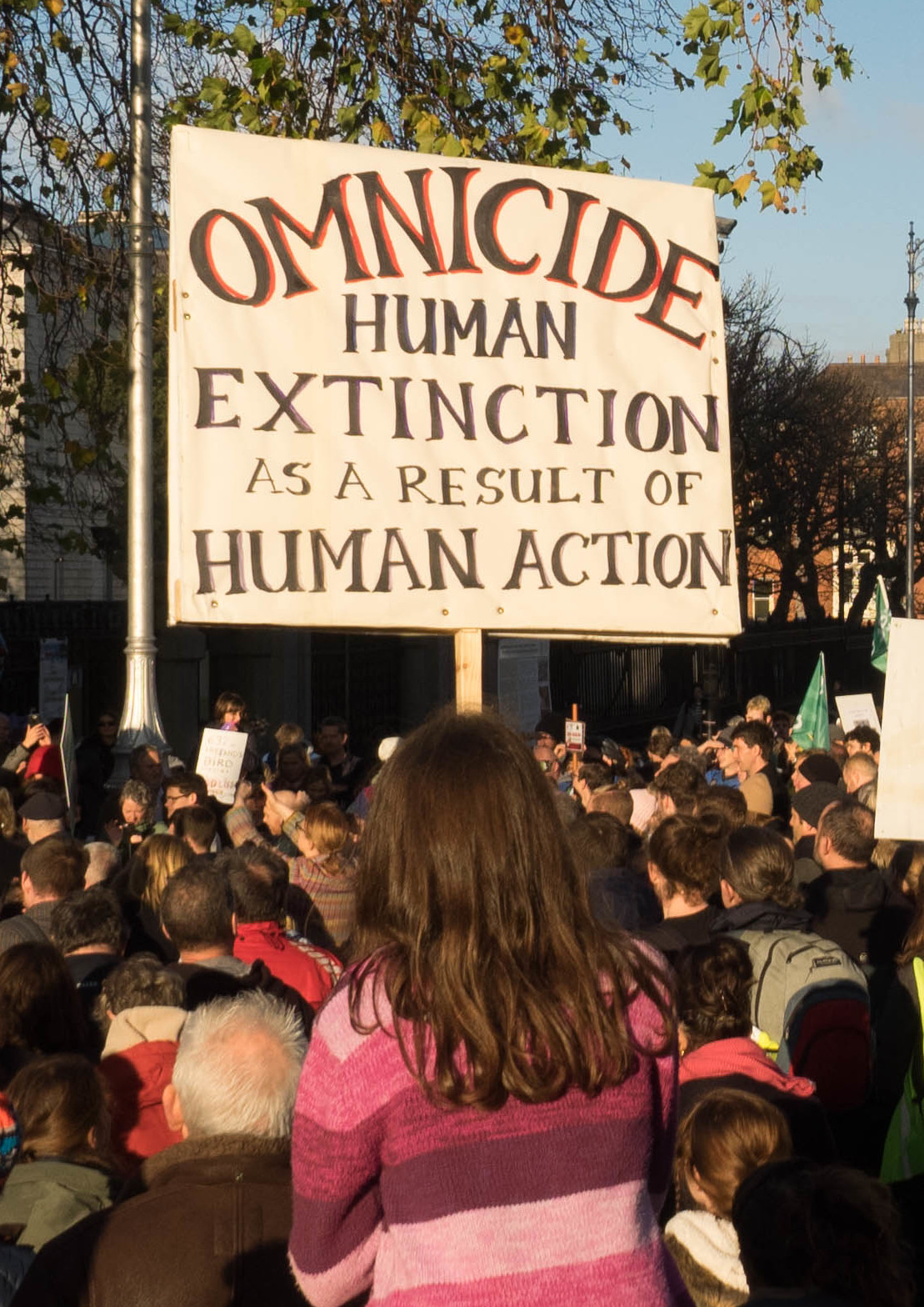
Placard against omnicide, at Extinction Rebellion (2018)

In a 2010 interview with The Australian, the late Australian scientist Frank Fenner predicted the extinction of the human race within a century, primarily as the result of human overpopulation, environmental degradation, and climate change. There are several economists who have discussed the importance of global catastrophic risks. For example, Martin Weitzman argues that most of the expected economic damage from climate change may come from the small chance that warming greatly exceeds the mid-range expectations, resulting in catastrophic damage. Richard Posner has argued that humanity is doing far too little, in general, about small, hard-to-estimate risks of large-scale catastrophes.

=== Individual vs. species risks ===
Although existential risks are less manageable by individuals than, for example, health risks, according to Ken Olum, Joshua Knobe, and Alexander Vilenkin, the possibility of human extinction does have practical implications. For instance, if the "universal" doomsday argument is accepted, it changes the most likely source of disasters and hence the most efficient means of preventing them.

=== Difficulty ===
Some scholars argue that certain scenarios, including global thermonuclear war, would struggle to eradicate every last settlement on Earth. Physicist Willard Wells points out that any credible extinction scenario would have to reach into a diverse set of areas, including the underground subways of major cities, the mountains of Tibet, the remotest islands of the South Pacific, and even McMurdo Station in Antarctica, which has contingency plans and supplies for long isolation. In addition, elaborate bunkers exist for government leaders to occupy during a nuclear war. The existence of nuclear submarines, capable of remaining hundreds of meters deep in the ocean for potentially years, should also be taken into account. Any number of events could lead to a massive loss of human life, but if the last few (see minimum viable population) most resilient humans are unlikely to also die off, then that particular human extinction scenario may not seem credible.

== Ethics ==
=== Value of human life ===
"Existential risks" are risks that threaten the entire future of humanity, whether by causing human extinction or by otherwise permanently crippling human progress. Multiple scholars have argued, based on the size of the "cosmic endowment," that because of the inconceivably large number of potential future lives that are at stake, even small reductions of existential risk have enormous value.

In one of the earliest discussions of the ethics of human extinction, Derek Parfit offers the following thought experiment:

I believe that if we destroy mankind, as we now can, this outcome will be much worse than most people think. Compare three outcomes:

(1) Peace.
(2) A nuclear war that kills 99% of the world's existing population.
(3) A nuclear war that kills 100%.

(2) would be worse than (1), and (3) would be worse than (2). Which is the greater of these two differences? Most people believe that the greater difference is between (1) and (2). I believe that the difference between (2) and (3) is very much greater.

— Derek Parfit

The scale of what is lost in an existential catastrophe is determined by humanity's long-term potential—what humanity could expect to achieve if it survived. From a utilitarian perspective, the value of protecting humanity is the product of its duration (how long humanity survives), its size (how many humans there are over time), and its quality (on average, how good is life for future people). On average, species survive for around a million years before going extinct. Parfit points out that the Earth will remain habitable for around a billion years. And these might be lower bounds on our potential: if humanity is able to expand beyond Earth, it could greatly increase the human population and survive for trillions of years. The size of the foregone potential that would be lost were humanity to become extinct is very large. Therefore, reducing existential risk by even a small amount would have a very significant moral value.

Carl Sagan wrote in 1983:

If we are required to calibrate extinction in numerical terms, I would be sure to include the number of people in future generations who would not be born.... (By one calculation), the stakes are one million times greater for extinction than for the more modest nuclear wars that kill "only" hundreds of millions of people. There are many other possible measures of the potential loss – including culture and science, the evolutionary history of the planet, and the significance of the lives of all of our ancestors who contributed to the future of their descendants. Extinction is the undoing of the human enterprise.

Philosopher Robert Adams in 1989 rejected Parfit's "impersonal" views but spoke instead of a moral imperative for loyalty and commitment to "the future of humanity as a vast project... The aspiration for a better society—more just, more rewarding, and more peaceful... our interest in the lives of our children and grandchildren, and the hopes that they will be able, in turn, to have the lives of their children and grandchildren as projects."

Philosopher Nick Bostrom argues in 2013 that preference-satisfactionist, democratic, custodial, and intuitionist arguments all converge on the common-sense view that preventing existential risk is a high moral priority, even if the exact "degree of badness" of human extinction varies between these philosophies.

Parfit argues that the size of the "cosmic endowment" can be calculated from the following argument: If Earth remains habitable for a billion more years and can sustainably support a population of more than a billion humans, then there is a potential for 10^{16} (or 10,000,000,000,000,000) human lives of normal duration. Bostrom goes further, stating that if the universe is empty, then the accessible universe can support at least 10^{34} biological human life-years and, if some humans were uploaded onto computers, could even support the equivalent of 10^{54} cybernetic human life-years.

Some economists and philosophers have defended views, including exponential discounting and person-affecting views of population ethics, on which future people do not matter (or matter much less), morally speaking. While these views are controversial, they would agree that an existential catastrophe would be among the worst things imaginable. It would cut short the lives of eight billion presently existing people, destroying all of what makes their lives valuable, and most likely subjecting many of them to profound suffering. So even setting aside the value of future generations, there may be strong reasons to reduce existential risk, grounded in concern for presently existing people.

Beyond utilitarianism, other moral perspectives lend support to the importance of reducing existential risk. An existential catastrophe would destroy more than just humanity—it would destroy all cultural artifacts, languages, and traditions, and many of the things we value. So moral viewpoints on which we have duties to protect and cherish things of value would see this as a huge loss that should be avoided. One can also consider reasons grounded in duties to past generations. For instance, Edmund Burke writes of a "partnership...between those who are living, those who are dead, and those who are to be born". If one takes seriously the debt humanity owes to past generations, Ord argues the best way of repaying it might be to "pay it forward" and ensure that humanity's inheritance is passed down to future generations.

=== Voluntary extinction ===
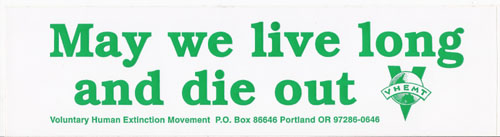
Voluntary Human Extinction Movement

Some philosophers adopt the antinatalist position that human extinction would be a beneficial thing. David Benatar argues that coming into existence is always serious harm, and therefore it is better that people do not come into existence in the future. Further, Benatar, animal rights activist Steven Best, and anarchist Todd May posit that human extinction would be a positive thing for the other organisms on the planet and the planet itself, citing, for example, the omnicidal nature of human civilization. The environmental view in favor of human extinction is shared by the members of the Voluntary Human Extinction Movement and the Church of Euthanasia, who call for refraining from reproduction and allowing the human species to go peacefully extinct, thus stopping further environmental degradation.

== In fiction ==
Jean-Baptiste Cousin de Grainville's 1805 science fantasy novel Le dernier homme (The Last Man), which depicts human extinction due to infertility, is considered the first modern apocalyptic novel and credited with launching the genre. Other notable early works include Mary Shelley's 1826 The Last Man, depicting human extinction caused by a pandemic, and Olaf Stapledon's 1937 Star Maker, "a comparative study of omnicide."

Some 21st-century pop-science works, including The World Without Us by Alan Weisman and the television specials Life After People and Aftermath: Population Zero, pose a thought experiment: what would happen to the rest of the planet if humans suddenly disappeared? A threat of human extinction, such as through a technological singularity (also called an intelligence explosion), drives the plot of innumerable science fiction stories; an influential early example is the 1951 film adaptation of When Worlds Collide. Usually the extinction threat is narrowly avoided, but some exceptions exist, such as R.U.R. and Steven Spielberg's A.I.

== See also ==
- Apocalypticism
- Societal collapse
- Doomsday Clock
- Eschatology
- Extinction event
- Global catastrophic risk
- Ultimate fate of the universe
- Great Filter
- Holocene extinction
- Speculative evolution
- Voluntary Human Extinction Movement
- World War III
- Posthuman
- Neutron star merger § Effect on Earth

== Sources ==
- Bostrom, Nick (2002). "Existential risks: analyzing human extinction scenarios and related hazards". Journal of Evolution and Technology. 9. ISSN 1541-0099.
- Bostrom, Nick; Cirkovic, Milan M. (September 29, 2011) [Orig. July 3, 2008]. "1: Introduction". In Bostrom, Nick; Cirkovic, Milan M. (eds.). Global Catastrophic Risks. Oxford University Press. pp. 1–30. ISBN 978-0-19-960650-4. OCLC 740989645.
  - Rampino, Michael R. "10: Super-volcanism and other geophysical processes of catastrophic import". In Bostrom & Cirkovic (2011), pp. 205–221.
  - Napier, William. "11: Hazards from comets and asteroids". In Bostrom & Cirkovic (2011), pp. 222–237.
  - Dar, Arnon. "12: Influence of Supernovae, gamma-ray bursts, solar flares, and cosmic rays on the terrestrial environment". In Bostrom & Cirkovic (2011), pp. 238–262.
  - Frame, David; Allen, Myles R. "13: Climate change and global risk". In Bostrom & Cirkovic (2011), pp. 265–286.
  - Kilbourne, Edwin Dennis. "14: Plagues and pandemics: past, present, and future". In Bostrom & Cirkovic (2011), pp. 287–304.
  - Yudkowsky, Eliezer. "15: Artificial Intelligence as a positive and negative factor in global risk". In Bostrom & Cirkovic (2011), pp. 308–345.
  - Wilczek, Frank. "16: Big troubles, imagined and real". In Bostrom & Cirkovic (2011), pp. 346–362.
  - Cirincione, Joseph. "18: The continuing threat of nuclear war". In Bostrom & Cirkovic (2011), pp. 381–401.
  - Ackerman, Gary; Potter, William C. "19: Catastrophic nuclear terrorism: a preventable peril". In Bostrom & Cirkovic (2011), pp. 402–449.
  - Nouri, Ali; Chyba, Christopher F. "20: Biotechnology and biosecurity". In Bostrom & Cirkovic (2011), pp. 450–480.
  - Phoenix, Chris; Treder, Mike. "21: Nanotechnology as global catastrophic risk". In Bostrom & Cirkovic (2011), pp. 481–503.
- Bostrom, Nick (2013). "Existential Risk Prevention as Global Priority". Global Policy. 4 (1): 15–31. doi:10.1111/1758-5899.12002. ISSN 1758-5899. [ PDF ]
- Leslie, John (1996). The End of the World: The Science and Ethics of Human Extinction. Routledge. ISBN 978-0-415-14043-0. OCLC 1158823437.
- Posner, Richard A. (November 11, 2004). Catastrophe: Risk and Response. Oxford University Press. ISBN 978-0-19-534639-8. OCLC 224729961.
- Rees, Martin J. (March 19, 2003). Our Final Hour: A Scientist's Warning: how Terror, Error, and Environmental Disaster Threaten Humankind's Future in this Century--on Earth and Beyond. Basic Books. ISBN 978-0-465-06862-3. OCLC 51315429.
