= List of Naked Science episodes =

The following is a list of episodes of Naked Science, an American documentary television series which premiered in 2004 on the National Geographic Channel.

== Episodes ==
=== Season 1 (2004) ===
No. overall	No. in series	Topic/Title	Original release date
1	1	Killer Asteroids	September 15, 2004
2	2	Super Volcanoes	September 22, 2004
3	3	Angry Earth	September 29, 2004
4	4	Who Built Stonehenge?	October 6, 2004
5	5	10 Deadliest Sharks	November 10, 2004
6	6	Bermuda Triangle	November 17, 2004
7	7	Atlantis	November 24, 2004
8	8	Alien Contact	December 1, 2004
9	9	What Is Human?	December 8, 2004
10	10	Angry Skies	December 22, 2004

=== Season 2 (2005) ===
No. overall	No. in series	Topic/Title	Original release date
11	1	Earth's Core	January 5, 2005
12	2	Surviving Nature's Fury	January 12, 2005
13	3	Shark Attacks	January 22, 2005
14	4	Telepathy	February 16, 2005
15	5	Volcano Alert	March 10, 2005
16	6	Spacemen	August 29, 2005
17	7	Bullets	September 12, 2005
18	8	Tsunami Warning	October 17, 2005
19	9	Birth of the Earth	October 24, 2005
20	10	Landslides	October 31, 2005
21	11	Loch Ness	November 7, 2005
22	12	Close Encounters	December 17, 2005

=== Season 3 (2006) ===
No. overall	No. in series	Topic/Title	Original release date
23	1	Moon Mysteries	January 15, 2006
24	2	Hot Science from Canada	January 23, 2006
25	3	What's Sexy?	February 13, 2006
26	4	Atkins Diet	March 6, 2006
27	5	Death of the Sun	March 20, 2006
28	6	Big Freeze	March 29, 2006
29	7	Roman Tech	April 26, 2006
30	8	Lightning	May 24, 2006
31	9	The Deep	June 28, 2006
32	10	Explosive Force	July 5, 2006
33	11	Pyramids	July 12, 2006
34	12	Colliding Continents	July 19, 2006
35	13	Triumph of the Tank	August 17, 2006
36	14	Birth of the Universe	September 6, 2006
37	15	Freeze Me	September 20, 2006
38	16	Forensics Under Fire	October 12, 2006
39	17	Ancient Asteroid	October 21, 2006
40	18	Human Extinction	November 2, 2006
41	19	Deadliest Planets	December 6, 2006
42	20	Evolution- Was Darwin Wrong?	December 7, 2006

=== Season 4 (2007) ===
No. overall	No. in series	Topic/Title	Original release date
43	1	Meltdown	January 31, 2007
44	2	Glacier Meltdown	February 1, 2007
45	3	Destructive Forces	February 21, 2007
46	4	Stone Age Apocalypse	February 28, 2007
47	5	Comets	March 7, 2007
48	6	Prehistoric Americans	March 14, 2007
49	7	Deep Space Probes	March 28, 2007
50	8	Polar Apocalypse	April 1, 2007
51	9	Dino Meteor	April 12, 2007
52	10	Planet Storm	April 26, 2007
53	11	Killer Lakes	May 3, 2007
54	12	Ring of Fire	August 2, 2007
55	13	Comet Mysteries	August 9, 2007
56	14	Space Mysteries: Alien Safari	August 9, 2007
57	15	Hyper Hurricanes	October 18, 2007
58	16	Dangers of the Deep	October 25, 2007
59	17	Solar Force	October 30, 2007
60	18	Birth of the Solar System	November 6, 2007
61	19	Hubble Trouble	November 6, 2007

=== Season 5 (2008) ===
No. overall	No. in series	Topic/Title	Original release date
62	1	Grand Canyon	February 11, 2008
63	2	The Rockies	February 28, 2008
64	3	Birth of America	March 6, 2008
65	4	Birth of Life	March 13, 2008
66	5	Pluto Rediscovered	March 20, 2008
67	6	Our Atmosphere	April 1, 2008
68	7	Snow Ball Earth	April 8, 2008
69	8	Denali National Park	May 21, 2008
70	9	Deadly Cyclone	May 22, 2008
71	10	Mars: Waterworld	May 25, 2008
72	11	Saturn's Secrets	May 25, 2008
73	12	Asteroid Alert	May 27, 2008
74	13	First Mariners	August 28, 2008
75	14	Time Machine	September 11, 2008
76	15	Earth's Invisible Shield	September 18, 2008
77	16	Big Bang	September 25, 2008
78	17	Hubble's Amazing Universe	October 5, 2008
79	18	Supercontinent	October 9, 2008
80	19	Giant Crystal Cave	October 12, 2008
81	20	Death of the Universe	October 16, 2008
82	21	Five Years on Mars	November 2, 2008
83	22	Cracking the Earth's Crust	November 6, 2008
84	23	What Killed the Aztecs?	November 13, 2008
85	24	Monster Black Holes	December 7, 2008

=== Season 6 (2009) ===
No. overall	No. in series	Topic/Title	Original release date
86	1	Space Weather	January 5, 2009
87	2	Apocalypse Earth	January 26, 2009
88	3	Solar Storm	February 5, 2009
89	4	Super Diamonds	February 26, 2009
90	5	Birth of the Oceans	March 5, 2009
91	6	Death of the Earth	March 11, 2009
92	7	Journey to Jupiter	March 12, 2009
93	8	Death of a Star	March 12, 2009
94	9	Great Lakes	April 2, 2009
95	10	Ice Age Meltdown	April 9, 2009
96	11	How to Kill a Planet	April 23, 2009
97	12	Earth's Crust	May 7, 2009
98	13	Anatomy of a Hurricane	June 4, 2009
99	14	Twister Outbreak	June 11, 2009
100	15	Earth's Evil Twin	June 25, 2009
101	16	Secret World of Fireworks	July 2, 2009
102	17	Tsunami from Outer Space	July 9, 2009
103	18	How the West Was Made	July 16, 2009
104	19	Living on the Moon	July 19, 2009
105	20	Hawking's Universe	August 23, 2009
106	21	The Human Family Tree	August 30, 2009
107	22	How to Stop a Hurricane	September 9, 2009
108	23	Incinerator Earth	October 22, 2009
109	24	Earthquake Swarm	November 5, 2009
110	25	Dirty Bomb Attack	November 12, 2009
111	26	Countdown to Impact	December 3, 2009
112	27	Vesuvius Time Bomb	December 10, 2009
113	28	Ancient Astronomers	December 17, 2009

=== Season 7 (2010) ===
No. overall	No. in series	Topic/Title	Original release date
114	1	Surviving Ancient Alaska	January 28, 2010
115	2	Earth without the Moon	February 4, 2010
116	3	Finding the Origin of Life	February 11, 2010
117	4	Traveler's Guide to Saturn	February 14, 2010
118	5	Preventing Armageddon	February 18, 2010
119	6	Hunt for Aliens	April 1, 2010
120	7	Expedition Apocalypse	April 8, 2010
121	8	Earth from Above	April 22, 2010
122	9	Icelandic Volcano	April 29, 2010
123	10	10 Things You Didn't Know About Tsunamis	June 10, 2010
124	11	Dead Tired	June 17, 2010
125	12	21st Century Stealth Sub	June 24, 2010
126	13	Easter Island Eclipse	July 11, 2010
127	14	Swallowed by the Sun (see Aftermath)	July 22, 2010
128	15	When the Earth Stops Spinning (see Aftermath)	July 29, 2010
129	16	Lightning Chasers	August 5, 2010
130	17	Snowball Earth	August 22, 2010
131	18	Man-Made Disasters	November 1, 2010
132	19	City under the Sea	November 11, 2010
133	20	Ancient Sea Monsters	November 18, 2010
134	21	Alien Fireballs	December 2, 2010

=== Season 8 (2011) ===
No. overall	No. in series	Topic/Title	Original release date
135	1	Solar Powered Flight	January 13, 2011
136	2	Star Clock	January 20, 2011
137	3	Dinomorphosis	January 27, 2011
138	4	The Book that Can't Be Read	February 3, 2011
139	5	Birth of the Grand Canyon	February 24, 2011
140	6	Clash of the Continents. Fate of Man.	March 3, 2011
141	7	Storm Worlds: Cosmic Fire	March 24, 2011
142	8	O_{2} - The Molecule That Made Our World	May 12, 2011
143	9	Parallel Universes	May 19, 2011
The weirdest of science fiction does not compare to the concept of alternate versions of the universe we inhabit. Many scientists are starting to embrace the idea that there are perhaps endless variations on our own world where its inhabitants--all of us--constantly make opposite choices from the ones we make here. The rules of physics predict them, but can we ever travel to see one of them firsthand?
144	10	Venom Power	May 26, 2011
After nearly dying from a rattlesnake bite, scientist Bryan Fry has made it his mission to seek out and study the most poisonous venoms in the world. The toxins he collects could hold the key of future life-saving drugs. In this episode, he goes after the three most-deadly venoms found in North America.
145	11	Volcano Devils	June 9, 2011
146	12	World's Oldest Child	June 16, 2011
The nearly intact skull of a 6-year-old child was found in a Moroccan cave in 2009. Dental tests date it at over 100,000 years of age. A team of scientists attempts to reconstruct the world the child lived in, one that existed before agriculture, the pyramids, and modern religion.
147	13	Fireball of Christ	July 29, 2011
148	14	Make Me Superhuman	August 11, 2011
149	15	Space Vacation	August 25, 2011
150	16	Sea Strikers	August 26, 2011
151	17	Expedition Whisky	November 3, 2011
