= Extinctionism =

Extinctionism and extinctionist may refer to:

- Various theories about extinction of species, human race, social classes, etc.
- Extinctionism (religious concept), about extinction of sinners in the afterlife
- Voluntary Human Extinction Movement (VHEMT), a movement for human extinction via antinatalism
- Extinctionists, a fictional radical group in Artemis Fowl (series), book 6
