= VHE =

The acronym VHE may refer to:

- Valve Hammer Editor, a map editor for video games
- Very-High Energy, in astronomy and high-energy physics (refers to energies around the TeV)
- Voluntary Human Extinction

Alternately, "Vhe" is a name for the Ewe language, spoken in West Africa from Lake Volta to Benin.
