= The Earth After Us =

Book by Jan Zalasiewicz

- Author: Jan Zalasiewicz
- Language: English
- Genre: Non-fiction
- Publisher: Oxford University Press
- Publication date: 2008
- Publication place: United Kingdom
- Media type: Print (Hardback)
- Pages: 251 pp.
- ISBN: 978-0-19-921497-6 (13)
- OCLC: 221155414
- Dewey Decimal: 551.7 22
- LC Class: QH542.5 .Z35 2008

The Earth After Us is a 2008 non-fiction book by Jan Zalasiewicz about the geological legacy that humans might one day leave behind them. The paperback version was published in 2009.

== See also ==
- The World Without Us
- Life After People
- After Man
