= Human Enhancement =

2009 book edited by Nick Bostrom and Julian Savulescu

- First edition
- Authors: Julian Savulescu, Nick Bostrom
- Language: English
- Subject: Philosophy, ethics
- Genre: Non-fiction
- Publisher: Oxford University Press
- Publication date: 2009
- ISBN: 978-0199594962
- Preceded by: Anthropic Bias
- Followed by: Global Catastrophic Risks

Human Enhancement (2009) is a non-fiction book edited by philosopher Nick Bostrom and philosopher and bioethicist Julian Savulescu. Savulescu and Bostrom write about the ethical implications of human enhancement and to what extent it is worth striving towards.
