= Mexia Supermarket =

Former grocery store in Fort Worth, Texas

Exterior of Mexia Supermarket, shortly after being abandoned

Mexia Supermarket was a grocery store in the Rosemont neighborhood of Fort Worth, Texas, United States.

The business gained notoriety when it was abandoned without notice in mid-1999, fully stocked with perishables and other food items. Its electricity was cut some time afterward, which left the contents to further decompose until the odor and infestation became a public health concern. The cleanup was a costly operation that involved contact with biohazardous material.

== Background ==
The traditionally-decorated 36,000-square-foot (3,300 m^{2}) rectangular building at 3900 Hemphill Street was constructed for Danals Food Stores, a small Mexican grocery-and-restaurant chain headquartered in nearby Dallas. It was the largest ethnic supermarket in the area upon its opening in late 1987.

As Danals, this location had been the scene of an attempted armed robbery-turned-homicide on May 30, 1994, in which 19-year-old manager Eduardo Lopez and an unnamed assistant manager were approached by two unidentified men and forced to re-enter the store at gunpoint. Lopez was shot twice after turning to face the assailants as they directed the managers to the office. When the assistant manager was unable to open the store's safe, the would-be robbers attempted to lock him inside a storage freezer and fled on foot. Due to the freezer's latch not engaging, the assistant manager escaped unharmed and notified emergency services. Lopez then succumbed to his injuries at John Peter Smith Hospital a short time afterward. Danals was forced to pay US$500,000 in restitution to Lopez's family in August 1995, as the court ruled the store's lack of security was negligent in the face of the area's crime rate.

Danals was listed to have occupied the building as late as June 26, 1998.

== As Mexia ==
Mexia Supermarket was established by Advance Investment corporation, by Dung Chang and Kung Song, after it obtained a 15-year, US$975,000 loan from Comerica Bank-Texas to acquire the newly-vacated store. The shop opened as Mexia on or before October 5, 1998, listed as its first taxable date for sales tax. Despite the changeover, the business was not remodeled save for a new sign, with references to Danals still present on painted window advertisements until its closure. Due to poor profits and a debt of approximately US$1.14 million owed to various creditors, the shop closed, and the owners began to default on their loan payments as early as June 1999.

Sources disagree on the closing date. The Associated Press stated that the shop closed in July of that year, while the local Fort Worth Star-Telegram reported the shop closed at the end of August. Nearby residents called the city as early as September 15, 1999, to inform them of the store's closure; after which the store's health permit was cancelled and removed from the list of active food businesses.

Advance Investment Corp. filed for Chapter 7 bankruptcy on September 28 or 29 of that year, with Steven Strange representing the company as their lawyer. Comerica Bank-Texas acted as the lien of the building.

== Abandonment ==
Strange asserted that he had called the bank lawyers to inform them of a bankruptcy and that the store had closed and he had been given the keys. The Star-Telegram quoted him as saying that the bank or the trustee would generally take steps to dispose of the property inside the building. In this case, however, they did not. He said, "I can't really tell you what happened. Apparently, the electric company turned off the electricity Oct. 18, and obviously, no one had done anything about it then."

Other sources question when the power went out. Brian Boerner, director of the Fort Worth Department of Environmental Management, was quoted by the Star-Telegram in a November 13 article as saying, "About 60 to 90 days ago, the guy flipped the breaker, locked the doors and walked away."

Due to the failure to communicate properly, all unsold products remained in the shop after its abandonment. The electricity was cut, resulting in the goods to expire and rot due to not being refrigerated. The decomposing goods attracted numerous pest species like flies, cockroaches, and rats. Had the situation been managed as Strange described it, the food would have gone to food banks like the Metroplex Food Bank, which was in desperate need of donations at the time.

On October 20, the residents began to complain of a foul odor. One told The Dallas Morning News that "I got a headache just from walking past it". A housekeeper at nearby Texas Christian University told the Star-Telegram, "It's strong, especially when the wind is blowing. I told my husband several times that something smelled awful—something smelled like dead animals. Then one day I walked over there, and there were flies all over it. It was gross."

On October 27, the city discovered that the property was in bankruptcy and had been transferred to a bankruptcy trustee. Comerica Bank-Texas told the city they had hired a contractor to assess the store and begin cleaning by November 2. When the contractor, A Plus Budget Movers, arrived at the store, it became clear the company was not qualified to handle the situation. On November 4, the bank told the city it was not the legal owner of the property and was not responsible for the cleanup. It was also reported that two teenagers had broken into the property before the cleanup, who were arrested when caught. More than a week later, the Fort Worth Health Department declared the store a health hazard, and the city began preparing to clean it up.

== Cleanup ==
The Health Department partnered with the Environmental Management and Code Enforcement departments and hired contractors from Garner Environmental to aid in the cleanup. Prior to the cleanup, several precautions were taken in order to ensure a safe environment.

Speaking to the Fort Worth Star-Telegram, Boerner said, "We have flies, rats, and other things living in it. It's not so much the animals but the potential diseases they carry." He later said, "I've been in this business for 14 years, this is the first I've ever heard of this. You think of what has been there for 90 days—produce, dairy, meats. It's kind of hard to comprehend."

The building was fumigated over the weekend of November 13–14. The cleanup was scheduled to begin on November 15; however, it was postponed until the following day to collect federally required indoor air samples for analysis and to ensure worker safety. This precaution was taken due to the sheer volume of chemicals used during fumigation.

The diseases that festered in the store included E. coli, which city spokesperson Pat Svacina said was "abundant, active, and growing" when workers first entered the building on November 3. That day, an environmental management specialist also detected "dangerous gases and low levels of oxygen inside the store".

As an additional safety measure, the workers had to be in hazmat suits complete with air filtration systems and be decontaminated every time they left the building.

Workers used loaders and shovels to collect rotten food and any resulting liquid material from the store, which they then transferred to large, sealed trash containers. Workers were relieved to find that most of the perishable items had been packaged in plastic or other packaging, making cleanup easier than expected. No cuts of meat were left hanging as initially feared.

By November 23, all food products were removed from the building, and the end of the cleanup operation was scheduled for November 26. Despite this, the sanitation of the building was not completed until November 30.

The initial cost of the cleanup was estimated at $10,000, but it was quickly surpassed. Svacina told the Star-Telegram on November 23 that "Last week, they were saying costs were accruing at between $5,000 and $8,000 a day. It will be a substantial amount of money, well over $10,000." It is unknown who footed the cleanup bill, as the final source referencing the cost said, "The city maintains that someone will pay for the cleanup, which is estimated to be in the tens of thousands of dollars, or the city will place a lien on the property."

== Aftermath ==
Ten vendors removed salvageable items, such as soda machines and cash registers, from the store around November 23. However, due to the conditions inside the store, none of the food could be recovered, even including the canned goods. Svacina had said, "Those canned goods were covered in bacteria and stuff. Even if we went in there, got through the cleaning process, there is no way they could sanitize them and guarantee someone couldn't get sick."

On the afternoon of December 9, a meeting was held between city staff members and residents regarding the Mexia Supermarket. Although the building's disinfection was completed on November 30, officials said during the week of December 9 that "foul odors persist."

After a short period of vacancy, the property was bought by a supermarket chain spanning Oklahoma and Texas named Terry's Mart in 2005. After a few years of ownership, Terry's Mart (then changed to 'Terry's El Mariachi Market') left the property, resulting in vacancy aside from the XL Parts auto parts store controlling part of the asset. The supermarket was sold to "Cross Family Trust", a trust. In 2016, part of the property was bought by a Family Dollar market. Between 2017 and 2018 the store became a Dollar General and an auto parts store called "XL Parts". The Dollar General closed in late 2025.

On January 26, 2010, the store was featured in an episode of Life After People, a television series in which experts speculate about what would happen if humans suddenly disappeared. The episode, titled "The Last Supper", was based on what would happen to humanity's food supply. The footage from inside the store featured in the episode had been previously presumed lost and was part of a much larger quantity of footage filmed inside the store during the clean-up. Further footage was discovered in July 2025, sourced from B-roll and newsreels from KXAS-TV.
