= Life After People =

2008 American apocalyptic television series

- Created by: David de Vries
- Narrated by: James Lurie
- Country of origin: United States
- No. of seasons: 3 (+ 1 special)
- No. of episodes: 28 (+ 1 special)

Production
- Running time: 45 minutes
- Production companies: Flight 33 Productions (Special, Seasons 1 and 2), Cream Productions (Season 3)

Original release
- Network: History
- Release: January 21, 2008 – September 13, 2025

Life After People is a television series on which scientists, mechanical engineers, and other experts speculate about what might become of planet Earth if humanity suddenly disappeared. The featured experts also talk about the impact of human absence on the environment and the vestiges of civilization thus left behind. The series was preceded by a two-hour special that aired on January 21, 2008, on the History Channel which served as a de facto pilot for the series that premiered April 21, 2009. The documentary and subsequent series were both narrated by James Lurie.

After a 15-year hiatus, History premiered a new third season on July 14, 2025.

== Format ==
The program does not speculate on how humanity may disappear, stipulating only that it has, and that it has done so suddenly, leaving everything behind including household pets and livestock that have to fend for themselves. The thought experiment is based on documented results of the sudden removal of humans from a geographical area and thus, the discontinuation of the maintenance of buildings and urban infrastructure. Lurie's narration begins:

What would happen if every human on Earth disappeared? This isn't the story of how we might vanish...it is the story of what will happen to the world we leave behind.

The series' episodes thematically offer examples of urban and biological decay. The focus is on specific locations such as skyscrapers, religious icons, bridges and dams, and government buildings, and the fate of certain related objects, such as artifacts, documents and human bodies. The fate of some kinds of flora and fauna are covered as well. Each episode also contains a segment in which experts examine real locations that have been abandoned by people, including ghost towns and other sites of deterioration, where the deterioration has been caused by events similar to those outlined in the episode. Although the series speculates on the fates of landmarks around the world, the main focus is on situations that may occur at locations in the United States.

The various events that may occur after people disappear suddenly are depicted using CGI dramatizations. The timeline of predicted events begins approximately one day after the disappearance of humankind and extends at various intervals up to one hundred million years into the future.

Beginning with the third season, there is use of AI generated video. The new season's executive producer, Yoshi Stone, claimed that using AI technology helped them to "react much more quickly and really expand our visual horizons" at a lower cost. He cited Las Vegas as an example, in which he claimed that using AI helped them to visualize the entire city as a whole and not just limited to a single block or casino.

== Episodes ==
=== Series overview ===
Season	Episodes	Originally released	
Season	Episodes	First released	Last released
Special		January 21, 2008	
1	10	April 21, 2009	June 23, 2009
2	10	January 5, 2010	March 16, 2010
3	8	July 14, 2025	September 13, 2025

=== Special (2008) ===
Title	Original release date
"Life After People"	January 21, 2008
Pripyat, abandoned towns on islands off the coast of Maine, and tunnels under New York City are highlighted in this documentary to show how the landscape of our planet would drastically change in the event of human absence.

=== Season 1 (2009) ===
No. in series	No. in season	Title	Original air date
1	1	"The Bodies Left Behind"	April 21, 2009
This episode looks at the future of cities like Boston and Houston and their static structures after the disappearance of humanity and what will happen to the human bodies that are buried, embalmed, and mummified, as well as the fate of the Immortality Drive inside the International Space Station, cryonically frozen bodies and human embryos, and parrots. This episode also examines the fate of the Astrodome, the Bunker Hill Bridge, the John Hancock Tower, the JPMorgan Chase Tower, the Sistine Chapel and the Statue of Liberty. The episode also explores Hashima Island in Japan, which was formerly host to several coal mines, but was left to nature in 1974 as the mines became depleted, having since become a tourist attraction as a result of its well-preserved ruins and as a site of industrial heritage.
2	2	"Outbreak"	April 28, 2009
This episode predicts the uncontrolled encroachment of nature upon the abandoned cities of Chicago, Atlanta and London, and how deadly viruses, like the one that causes rabies, could spin out of control as the populations of escaped pets and other animals, like wild hogs and the corgis belonging to Queen Elizabeth II at Buckingham Palace, could explode without the interference of humanity. This episode also examines the fate of Big Ben, the John Hancock Center, the L train, the Sears Tower, Wrigley Field and the Confederate Memorial Carving, the latter of which may last for more than 5,000 years. The episode also explores nearby Gary, Indiana, portions of which were abandoned by people in the late 1970s.
3	3	"The Capital Threat"	May 5, 2009
In a life after people, the forces of nature could consume Washington, D.C. and America's national treasures as they fall into ruin, zoo animals could escape their enclosures, and Los Angeles could burn in an inferno, suffer a massive earthquake, and eventually return to its original state before it became civilized by humans. The episode also explores Angkor Wat in Cambodia, which, while not fully abandoned, was largely neglected for centuries before its impressive preserved architecture and long history attracted renewed interest.
4	4	"Heavy Metal"	May 12, 2009
This episode projects how long the nation's buildings and bridges will stand before the elements consume the steel and concrete, from the Empire State Building, Chrysler Building, Brooklyn Bridge and the Roosevelt Island Tramway in New York City to the Gateway Arch in St. Louis, and how once domesticated animals, like horses, will return to wild herds that roam America's grasslands. The episode also examines the ghost town of Rhyolite, Nevada, a town its designers wanted to rival Chicago, which was abandoned by people around 1910, and now stands remarkably intact, preserved by the dry air and regularly described as 'one of the most photographed ghost towns in the West'.
5	5	"The Invaders"	May 20, 2009
After the disappearance of humanity, sandstorms could sweep through Phoenix, Miami and Shanghai might disappear into the ocean, and invasive plants and animals such as Burmese pythons will spread uncontrolled. Also included is the fate of the Taj Mahal in India, the Kennedy Space Center, the Grand Canyon Skywalk, and the Seven Mile Bridge in the Florida Keys. The episode also explores the village of Tyneham, England, which was requisitioned by the War Office in 1943 during World War II in preparation for the D-Day landings, and has remained under the ownership of the military ever since as a test range.
6	6	"Bound and Buried"	May 26, 2009
In a post-apocalyptic future, even sealed artifacts such as the Liberty Bell and the United States Declaration of Independence in Philadelphia, Pennsylvania and the seeds of the Svalbard Global Seed Vault in Norway will not survive indefinitely. Wolf populations and feral dogs struggle to survive. In San Francisco cables snap on the Golden Gate Bridge and the cable cars are sent careening through the streets, while the Petronas Twin Towers in Kuala Lumpur survive longer than most other modern towers. In Paris, the fate of the Mona Lisa, the prehistoric Lascaux caves, the modern Lascaux II replica, the Venus de Milo and the Notre-Dame de Paris are shown. The episode also examines Centralia, Pennsylvania, which was largely abandoned in 1984 because of a coal-seam fire burning beneath the town that continues to rage to this day.
7	7	"Sin City Meltdown"	June 2, 2009
This episode predicts how the gambling meccas of humankind will deteriorate without people; rats invade Las Vegas, Nevada, the famous hotels such as the Stratosphere Tower and the Luxor Las Vegas crumble to dust, the Las Vegas sign falls off its post, and the wax statues of celebrities at the Madame Tussauds museum melt under exposure to the hot desert air. Atlantic City is destroyed as ocean waves and hurricanes smash through casinos, break up the boardwalk and piers and tarnish the fate of Lucy the Elephant. Camels go wild in North America, like their ancestors, and are transformed after the next ice age. Over thousands of years, the Voyager space probes are battered by impacts from dust and debris, leaving few recognizable remnants of humanity behind. The episode also examines the Americana Amusement Park in Monroe, Ohio, showing how degraded it has become after only recently having been abandoned in 2002.
8	8	"Armed & Defenseless"	June 9, 2009
In a future without people, the machines of war deteriorate; nuclear submarines lie on the ocean floor, and the USS Missouri is the target of a renewed "attack" on Pearl Harbor, as the ship transforms into a plant-covered island. Most dairy cows die, but a few survive and adapt to life on America's plains alongside thriving herds of bison. This episode also examines Aloha Tower in Honolulu, the Wells Fargo Center in Denver and North Brother Island off of New York City, which was abandoned around 1960.
9	9	"The Road To Nowhere"	June 16, 2009
This episode looks at how vehicles will deteriorate without people, how America's automobile plants and transportation symbols such as the Renaissance Center and the Ambassador Bridge will shatter in Detroit's harsh winters, and how unattended oil refineries will explode. In San Antonio the Alamo falls to a new invader, and the Tower Life Building meets its demise. Also, animals adapt, armadillos spread, some dogs rekindle their hunting instincts, and longhorn cattle flourish once again. This episode also examines the Packard plant and the 60 square miles (160 km^{2}) of Detroit which were abandoned in the 1960s.
10	10	"Waters Of Death"	June 23, 2009
In a world devoid of humans, water floods cities like New Orleans and Seattle. The marine animals housed inside the former city's aquarium die off. Head lice become extinct without human hosts. The fate of Seattle's symbolic Space Needle is shown as the city reverts to a salt marsh, and the humid atmosphere over the Arabian Peninsula wrecks the space-age structures of Dubai, including the Burj Al Arab hotel. The fate of Saint Basil's Cathedral in Moscow is shown and Louisiana's tallest building, One Shell Square, collapses. The episode examines the areas of New Orleans that were damaged by Hurricane Katrina and were left in ruins after the flood water receded.

=== Season 2 (2010) ===
No. in series	No. in season	Title	Original air date
11	1	"Wrath of God"	January 5, 2010
This episode predicts the fate of humanity's religious symbols and artifacts after the disappearance of humans – such as the Christ the Redeemer statue which stands over Rio de Janeiro, the Crystal Cathedral and the Memorial Coliseum in Southern California, the Colosseum, the Jubilee Church and St. Peter's Basilica in Rome, and the Shroud of Turin. Rattlesnakes thrive in the American Southwest, and shepherd dogs, following the instincts bred into them by humans, continue to protect sheep for several generations. The episode also examines Kolmanskop, a desert town in Namibia established by the Germans during a diamond rush, and abandoned in the 1960s, having remained in remarkable condition thanks to the arid environment of the surrounding Namib Desert.
12	2	"Toxic Revenge"	January 12, 2010
In a life after people, toxic materials leak into the environment without human intervention: spent nuclear fuel rods spontaneously burst into flames, chlorine gas spills out of tanks and turns lakes into deadly acid, and in New York City underground methane gas originates from Grand Central Terminal and leaks into the adjacent MetLife Building, which eventually ignites an explosion. Cargo ships from the Great Lakes drift past the fallen International Railway Bridge and tumble over the edge of Niagara Falls. Raccoons use homes as a temporary paradise. The episode also features Picher, Oklahoma, a toxic former lead mining town which has been slowly abandoned ever since the 1970s.
13	3	"Crypt of Civilization"	January 19, 2010
This episode looks at how crypts, safes, vaults and time capsules survive in a post-apocalyptic world, including a visit to the mysterious "Crypt of Civilization" at Oglethorpe University in Atlanta, Georgia, the Gherkin in London, the Marine Corps War Memorial and the Library of Congress in Washington, D.C. Military-trained German Shepherds battle coyotes in the wild and the remains of naval hero John Paul Jones are entombed by rising sea levels in Annapolis, Maryland. The proposed KEO satellite, Rosetta disks (focusing on one at the Smithsonian Institution), and the prototype 10,000-year clock meet their fates in the far future. The episode also examines Norwich State Hospital in Connecticut, sections of which were abandoned between 1970 and 1995.
14	4	"The Last Supper"	January 26, 2010
In a world without people, humanity's food supplies decay as supermarkets turn into breeding grounds for insects and vermin, humidity causes Leonardo da Vinci's mural The Last Supper in the Santa Maria delle Grazie to crumble, and both the landmark Randy's Donuts restaurant in Los Angeles and the restaurant atop Taipei 101 in Taiwan eventually succumb to the force of gravity. Snack cakes - including a certain brand known for its longevity - survive at least 25 years thanks to the preservatives inside them, but are outlasted by jars of honey, which can remain edible for millennia. The episode also includes footage from the Mexia Supermarket in Fort Worth, Texas, which sat abandoned for three months in 1999 with all its contents still inside after its owners went bankrupt and fled the USA, leaving a horrendous clean-up operation in their wake. This episode also examines the Tranquille Farms in the British Columbia Interior, which were abandoned and closed in 1985, and have since started returning to a natural state.
15	5	"Home Wrecked Homes"	February 2, 2010
This episode predicts the apocalyptic fate of homes—from the Stahl House outside Los Angeles to the San Remo in New York City. Co-op City sinks beneath the tide and Dubai's Burj Khalifa (the tallest building in the world) corrodes and collapses. Gas leaks turn suburban homes such as Levittown into infernos, a hidden flaw topples Hearst Castle, linseed oil in paint-soaked rags causes some high-end homes, including the San Remo apartments, to explode in flames, and the contents of the Bettman/Corbis Archive in Pennsylvania meet a tragic fate. Bobcats use abandoned houses as dens, and zebras from the Hearst Castle private zoo escape and survive for generations. The episode also visits the picturesque Italian commune of Balestrino, which has an old section that was completely abandoned due to geologic instability, with its residents moving the centre of the town to the foot of the hill on which the old buildings are built.
16	6	"Holiday Hell"	February 9, 2010
Vacation destinations and holiday treasures are featured in this episode; fireworks factories explode with no people to see the event, sand inside Knott's Berry Farm's Silver Bullet roller coaster is the key to its destruction, and domesticated reindeer join herds of wild caribou, only to be hunted by wolves. Lions escape the San Diego Wild Animal Park and fill the ecological role American lions once had. Nearby Palm Springs is consumed by the desert, its aerial tramway suffers a catastrophic failure, and its wind turbines shatter. In Detroit, Aldrige's Always Christmas store witnesses a not-so-jolly scene as the power goes out, only to later experience a somewhat more natural festive display when the winter weather blows snow inside, while plants compete for shelf space with decorations and fruitcake, which can survive for at least 130 years if prepared and stored properly. Meanwhile, while domestic turkeys struggle to survive, their wild counterparts continue to thrive. This episode also examines the Salton Sea and Salton City, California, a town once intended to be a resort community, but these plans never materialised, with some areas left in an eerie state of rust and urban decay.
17	7	"Waves of Devastation"	February 16, 2010
This episode examines the effects of water on humanity's structures. Rotterdam and Amsterdam flood as levees fail, washing away the treasures of the Boijmans Museum, while Sacramento is first swamped, then destroyed when the Folsom Dam ruptures. Non-native Asian carp, long the bane of boaters and conservationists, slip through human-made barriers to invade the Great Lakes, but must compete with another invasive species: the sea lamprey. The Trans-Alaska Pipeline spills its hazardous contents, the Santa Monica Pier sinks into the ocean, the Sydney Opera House caves in, and the Sydney Harbour Bridge tears apart. The episode also explores the former Soviet coal mining town of Pyramiden on the Svalbard archipelago, abandoned in 1998 when the mine closed. Pyramiden will likely remain intact for many years, as a combination of deliberate maintenance for tourists visiting the area and cold arctic temperatures have preserved the town's architecture.
18	8	"Sky's the Limit"	March 2, 2010
Human neglect affects the world's skies and aeronautic icons, including Air Force One, the Theme Building and a control tower at Los Angeles International Airport, the Spirit of St. Louis in the National Air and Space Museum in Washington, D.C., and the KVLY-TV mast in North Dakota. Elsewhere, Rocky Mountain locusts invade the cities in the Midwest, Mount Everest's ice preserves artifacts left by climbers and even the bodies of climbers who died on its summit, and the migratory patterns of birds and even the weather are affected by the absence of humankind patrolling the skies. The solar-powered radio station KTAO continues broadcasting long after humans are gone, thanks to its efficient solar panels and computer-operated broadcast. Cassini makes a crash landing on Saturn's moon Enceladus, leading to extremophile bacteria from Earth that had been present inside the probe colonizing its possible water ocean and possibly causing life to evolve on it. The episode also visits RCAF Station Edgar in Oro-Medonte, Ontario, a Cold War radar site which was abandoned in 1999, and the aging Berlin Tempelhof Airport in Germany which was closed in 2008.
19	9	"Depths of Destruction"	March 9, 2010
The underground and underwater world suffers a destructive destiny in a post-human era. The NORAD operations facility comes under assault, but the echo chambers below the foundation of the Capitol Records Building in Los Angeles outlast the structure's downfall. The subterranean Carlsbad Caverns in New Mexico are repopulated by bats, mineral rich water and geothermal heating means the already gigantic gypsum crystals inside the Naica Mine's Cave of the Crystals grow larger still, and humankind's former geothermal power sites such as the Geysers in northern California relinquish their strength to geologic forces. The SEA Underground system at Seattle's airport is disabled, the Underwater Sculpture Gardens outside of St. George's, Grenada provides new foundations for growing coral reefs, and Prairie dogs reclaim their territory in Lubbock. The episode features the Bonne Terre Mine, which was closed in 1962 and subsequently became partially flooded, and also the steamboat Arabia in Parkville, Missouri.
20	10	"Take Me To Your Leader"	March 16, 2010
This episode analyzes how structures and testaments devoted to world leaders factor adversely without human sustainment, among them include the White House, the Palace of Versailles, Thomas Jefferson's home at Monticello, the Secretariat Building and the General Assembly Chamber of the United Nations Headquarters, and the Hall of Supreme Harmony in China's Forbidden City. The entombed body of Ulysses S. Grant is buried for the first time in history when the London planes that grow nearby generate enough soil to cover the tomb's sarcophagus, and Mao Zedong's mysterious body at the Mausoleum of Mao Zedong submits to the quirks of his embalmers. As a result of his owner's disappearance, the dependent life of Barack Obama's dog, "Bo," is transformed as he embarks on an adventure into the wilderness. The episode also examines the aftermath of the Hiroshima bomb on the San Francisco Naval Shipyard in Hunters Point.

=== Season 3 (2025) ===
No. in series	No. in season	Title	Original air date
21	1	"Water World"	July 14, 2025
This episode explores how water, a life-giver, becomes a destructive force in a world without humans. Due to the invasive nutria population, and several hurricanes, the levees of New Orleans fail, while in the Thames Estuary, the explosives left in the SS Richard Montgomery are triggered, causing London to flood. The episode also highlights the impact of water on infrastructure, like the collapse of Louisiana's Superdome, along with the collapsing of GERD and the Aswan Dam, both leading to the flooding of the Nile. It features the sinking of Adventure of the Seas and the struggle for survival of Nile crocodiles moving into Lake Nasser in a world without human intervention.
22	2	"Shop ’Til You Drop"	July 21, 2025
Explores the fate of human-made structures related to shopping and shipping after people disappear. The Mall of America's K9s are kicked out by wolves, the top floor collapses on a display car, causing its battery to explode. The Port of Shanghai is destroyed by a roaming Cargo Ship. The HMM Oslo crashes into a tanker of Jet Fuel, and loses lots of its cargo. Grocery stores are infested with rats, and later, barn owls. After the ignition of the Port of Shanghai, the South China tiger arrives. It also examines the impact on food storage, like freeze-dried food.
23	3	"Urban Jungles"	July 28, 2025
In the absence of humanity, the world's most iconic cities—from New York, to Orlando, to Rio de Janeiro—are reclaimed by nature, as forests rise, animals roam free, and fire and flood undo centuries of construction. With the failing of its tuned mass damper, Central Park Tower, housing the snow monkeys that escaped from Central Park Zoo, collapses onto Billionaires' Row. What's left of the Statue of Liberty falls. Landslides crash into Rio's favelas, Lightning strikes Christ the Redeemer, and Tijuca National Park reclaims lots of Rio's coast. The natural gas pipelines underground send Orlando into flames. Orlando is weakened and slowly succumbs to the surrounding swamp and kudzu population.
24	4	"Sands of Time"	August 4, 2025
In a world without humans, the deserts we once tamed rise to reclaim our greatest triumphs—from the glittering lights of Las Vegas to the soaring heights of Dubai's Burj Khalifa. The Imperial Valley is both flooded by the All-American Canal and scorched, and the Salton Sea completely dries up, All of the collected toxins from the Imperial Valley are put into a sandstorm, and crashes into Los Angeles. Las Vegas is swarmed with moths and grasshoppers, its transformers are ignited, and the city goes dark, later catching on fire. Without quicklime, Caesars Palace deteriorates. The generators used to protect the structural integrity of the Burj Khalifa turn off in weeks, mesquite trees surround its foundation, and one lightning strike lights it in flames, then its elevators fall during another sandstorm, causing its demise.
25	5	"Home On The Strange"	August 12, 2025
After humanity ceases to exist, the homes we built—from suburban mansions and Miami condos to rural farmhouses—face a relentless siege by fire, flood, wildlife, and time. One Thousand Museum and other condominiums in Miami fall. Many of them infested with cockroaches. Domestic pigs break out and go feral. The Palo Verde Nuclear Generating Station explodes, spreading all of its toxins into nearby Mesa.
26	6	"The Underground Rises"	August 19, 2025
When humanity vanishes, the vast and fragile infrastructure hidden underground, from subways and pipelines to one of the biggest coal seams in the United States begins to unravel.
27	7	"Built to Last"	August 25, 2025
Humanity’s strongest structures were engineered to defy disaster—but in a world without people, even the mightiest begin to crack.
28	8	"Ticking Time Bombs"	September 13, 2025
Hidden dangers once held at bay by humans erupt with catastrophic force—from everyday objects ready to explode to chemical plants and locust plagues—as nature and human legacy collide, these ticking time bombs threaten to send the world up in smoke.

== Home media ==
A&E Home Video has released these DVDs:

That of the original documentary:

- Life After People (History Channel)
  - UPC: 733961110906
  - Released 18 March 2008 on DVD
  - Runtime: 94 minutes

That of the first season of the series:

- Life After People: The Complete Season One
  - UPC: 733961155303
  - Released 27 October 2009 on DVD
  - Runtime: 470 minutes

That of the second season of the series:

- Life After People: The Complete Season Two
  - UPC: 733961221626
  - Released 27 July 2010 on DVD
  - Runtime: 425 minutes

== Ratings ==
The two-hour special documentary had an audience of 5.4 million viewers and was the most watched program ever on the History Channel. The program was broadcast in the United Kingdom on Channel 4 and narrated by Struan Rodger on May 29, 2008 and in Australia on Channel Seven on November 25, 2008, edited down to air for 90 minutes and included additional footage of a decaying Sydney Harbour Bridge, with narration by Australian television presenter Simon Reeve.

== See also ==
- 10 Ways to End the World
- Aftermath (TV series), a similar TV series
  - Aftermath: Population Zero (special, preceding above series)
- The World Without Us
- The Future is Wild
- After Man
