= 10 Ways to End the World =

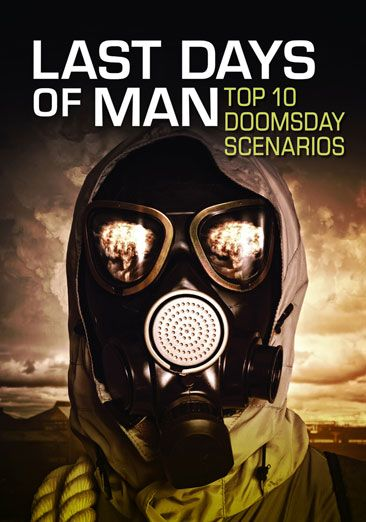
- Also known as: 10 Ways to End the World (Last Days of Man)
- Genre: Documentary
- Written by: Magnus Sjöström
- Directed by: Magnus Sjöström
- Country of origin: Sweden
- Original language: Swedish
- No. of seasons: 1
- No. of episodes: 2

Production
- Running time: 54 minutes
- Production company: Sveriges Utbildningsradio UR

Original release
- Network: Kunskapskanalen
- Release: 29 December 2010

10 Ways to End the World, a.k.a. Last Days of Man (original title Mänsklighetens sista dagar, literally "The Final Days of Humanity") is a Swedish TV series by Magnus Sjöström documenting catastrophes that could endanger human existence. The series is produced by Sveriges Utbildningsradio (UR) and was aired on Kunskapskanalen (in English: The Knowledge Channel) in December 2010 under the Swedish name Mänsklighetens sista dagar (Last days of Man) and on National Geographic and Arte in 2012. The series was nominated for the Scandinavian TV award, Kristallen, in 2011.

In the form of a top ten list, a set of doomsday scenarios—disasters that have the capacity to wipe out our species—is examined scientifically. The first part deals with threats to humanity from nature's violent forces. The second part deals with various threats that human society has created.

== See also ==
- Life After People
