= Global Catastrophic Risks (book) =

2008 non-fiction book

- First edition
- Authors: Nick Bostrom; Milan M. Ćirković
- Language: English
- Subject: Global catastrophic risks
- Genre: Non-fiction
- Publisher: Oxford University Press
- Publication date: 2008
- ISBN: 978-0199606504
- Preceded by: Human Enhancement
- Followed by: Superintelligence: Paths, Dangers, Strategies

Global Catastrophic Risks is a 2008 non-fiction book edited by philosopher Nick Bostrom and astronomer Milan M. Ćirković. The book is a collection of essays from 26 academics written about various global catastrophic and existential risks. A paperback version was published in 2011.

== Content ==
The risks covered by the book include both anthropogenic (man made) risks and non-anthropogenic risks.

- Anthropogenic: artificial general intelligence, biological warfare, nuclear warfare, nanotechnology, anthropogenic climate change, global warming, stable global totalitarianism
- Non-anthropogenic: asteroid impacts, gamma-ray bursts

The book also addresses overarching issues such as policy responses and methods for predicting and managing catastrophes.

== See also ==
- The Precipice: Existential Risk and the Future of Humanity (book)
- Our Final Hour (book)
