= Aftermath (2010 TV series) =

2010 documentary television series

- Created by: Rob Minkoff
- Written by: Warren Davis II; Michael Tupy
- Narrated by: Mike McCurlie; Reg E. Cathey; Trevor Nichols
- Country of origin: Canada
- No. of episodes: 5

Original release
- Network: History; National Geographic
- Release: March 5 – May 6, 2010

Aftermath is a 2010 Canadian-American documentary television series created by History Canada and produced by Cream Productions. It aired on National Geographic in the United States.

Aftermath consists of thought experiments looking at what would happen to Earth if extremely distant events and changes occurred in the present. The series is a follow-up to the TV special Aftermath: Population Zero.

In 2010, the series was nominated for a 2010 Gemini Award for best documentary.

== Episodes ==
=== The World After Humans/Population Zero ===
The series' pilot special, this episode hypothesizes what would happen if all humans suddenly disappeared from Earth.

=== World Without Oil ===
This episode hypothesizes a total oil depletion scenario, where almost all oil on Earth simply vanishes in one night, leaving behind only oil that has already been extracted, and products refined from oil, such as gasoline and diesel.

In the first few minutes, approximately 100,000 billion barrels (1.6×10^{16} L) of underground oil vanishes. Alarms in oil rigs sound as pipe pressure plummets, leading employees and chemists around the globe to discover the bizarre situation as it unfolds. One day after oil, asphalt, diesel, gasoline, and tar supplies become limited. This causes $2 trillion USD of stock to become worthless, and oil workers are dismissed as the industry collapses. Motorists rush to gas stations to fuel their cars for the last time, while oil tankers are called back to their countries of origin to conserve national reserves of oil. All international transportation is grounded, including logistics, meaning resources such as steel, food, medical supplies, and trash are not being moved.

Five days after oil, power stations start running out of diesel, sparking widespread outages. Martial law is declared to stop rioting and looting. Unemployment rises to 30%. Livestock die due to lack of food. Coal, which is still accessible, briefly becomes the main source of fuel, but quickly faces shortages. Thirty days after oil, diesel-powered passenger trains are running on rations, and the roads are empty of cars. Governments start biofuel planting programs, while nations with established biofuel industries, such as Brazil, are able to mitigate the effects of fuel shortages.

Five months after oil, the Big Three automobile manufacturers are nationalized by the U.S. government. Famine and drug-resistant infections become a leading cause of death, while many people begin to migrate as food shipments come every second day. Emergency vehicles are still given fuel rations. Stockpiled gasoline begins to degrade in quality due to it being stored in poor conditions, and civilians begin to experiment with chemicals to produce their own biofuel. While some governments embrace the use of biofuel and begin mass production, others start to wonder if they should plant crops for food or fuel, eventually abandoning biofuel planting altogether.

One year after oil, emergency vehicles are primarily operated by electric vehicles with lithium-ion batteries, or run on biofuel. Due to its value in battery production, the price of lithium rapidly rises, becoming a valuable commodity and creating jobs in industries revolving around the element. Populations of wild animals bounce back. In the countryside, more people practice subsistence farming, growing their own food, keeping livestock and hunting.

Ten years after oil, artificial satellites burn up in the atmosphere as maintaining them is of a reduced priority. Old and obsolete electronics are scavenged for precious metals as people engage in recycling on a massive scale. Algae is used to produce biofuel. Trucks deliver vital supplies to hospitals, indirectly improving life expectancy.

Forty years after oil, the skies are much clearer and cleaner as atmospheric pollutants are washed out by rain. Most vehicles now run on biofuel. Lithium battery cars are expensive, resulting in a re-emergence of public transportation and railways, and new towns grow along railway points. Some cities are eventually abandoned, but many others thrive. A world trade based on biofuel and lithium grows. Eventually, lithium supplies begin to run out, but balancing this with biofuel production means humanity is able to prosper once again.

=== Population Overload ===
This episode hypothesizes an overpopulation scenario where the human population of Earth doubles from 7 billion to 14 billion in one night.

The governments of the world attempt to cope at first by ordering the construction of gigantic high rise apartment complexes. However, the often outdated public works systems cannot handle this vastly increased load; bridges break and sewers fail, leading to contamination of the water supply. Much of the remaining woodlands of the earth are cleared to form new farms and housing. Emergency rationing becomes commonplace, and grain exporters stop their exports, leading to a drastic shortage in nations that relied on them. Even in wealthy countries, food and water resources are strained by the doubled population. Electrical grids have difficulty keeping up with the increased demand. New coal plants are built to relieve the pressure, but they result in drastically increased air pollution.

Water shortages become rampant, with insufficient water available for drinking or farming, and desalination plants are built. Looting leads to martial law in many countries. People in countries that lack water and food begin leaving the country in search of resources, prompting unprecedented human migration. Some countries such as the U.S. close their borders to refugees, while others are more accepting and attempt to help them. In the U.S., many people head to the Great Lakes, forming massive tent cities. A population crash begins, resulting in the die-off of billions of people due to the carrying capacity being exceeded.

Despite the grim outlook for humanity, thirty years after the doubling event, the population crash concludes. The total human population stabilizes at 4 billion, similar to that of the mid-1970s.

=== When the Earth Stops Spinning ===
This episode hypothesizes a scenario where the rotation of the Earth begins slowing dramatically, eventually coming to a complete stop. Though the actual rotation of the Earth is slowing, it is so slow it does not affect life in the present day; in this scenario, Earth would stop spinning in as little as five years. Unlike the other sudden changes featured in the series, this process is portrayed as taking place on a gradual scale, as if the Earth came to a complete stop in an instant, the momentum of the planet would cause everything on Earth's surface to be launched eastwards at the former rotational speed.

The first signs of the developing incident are that GPS satellites become desynchronised with Earth's reducing speed, causing discrepancies on the ground. Stock markets crash due to humanity's uncertain future. With less centrifugal force generated by Earth's rotation, the equatorial bulge begins to disappear, and water starts moving towards the poles. Russia, Canada, Antarctica, and Northern Europe are flooded. Air currents vital for the distribution of solar heat across the planet whirl towards the poles, while the atmosphere starts to thin at the equator, and people migrate to more northerly and southerly cities to keep up with denser air. There is a higher risk of solar radiation as the magnetosphere weakens because of the slowing inner core.

As the Earth slows, the planet's crust, mantle, and core slow down at different speeds. The massive friction generated from this process triggers great quantities of powerful earthquakes, including in locations which had never seen the phenomena before. Humans and numerous other animal species start suffering from sleep deprivation as their bodies cannot properly work in a day longer than 60 hours. The new oceans at the poles begin to flood the contiguous United States and Southern Europe.

Eventually, the Earth stops spinning altogether and its position becomes fixed with respect to the background stars, and as a result still experiences a day-night cycle synonymous with an entire year. The scorching day lasts for six months, while the remaining six months of the year are a lengthy cold, dark night. The planetary landscape now consists of one ocean approximately 10 miles deep in the north, another vast ocean in the south, and a vast girdle of land - a new supercontinent exposed by the water in the equator receding towards the poles - that spans the equator in its entirety. The equatorial supercontinent is surrounded by scattered giant islands, areas of the old continents not inundated by the sea. Most of the new continent is uninhabitable due to thin air, but the former ocean floor has sufficient air pressure for human life. A team of scientists set sail for the supercontinent to explore and study it, but harsh storms near the equator wreck their boat and wash the survivors ashore, where they face an uncertain future.

Survivors living in the Midwestern United States are safe from flooding and have sufficient air pressure to sustain human habitability, but in the new stable climate of the still Earth, whose axis remains tilted, resulting in different areas of the planet experiencing permanent seasonal conditions depending on their location during the six-month days, little to no precipitation occurs, putting the people at great risk; additionally, because the electricity supply has collapsed due to the flooding, the survivors are unable to desalinate the oceans for water for several years. The possibility of finding food remains as fish continue to thrive in the vastly-expanded seas. Survivors living in Hawaii, now part of the new equatorial supercontinent, are notably better off because they live about 1,000 miles north from the edge of the sun's path, receiving sufficient amounts of water from rain to last the year and having safer methods of fishing.

=== Red Giant/Swallowed by the Sun ===
This episode hypothesizes a scenario where the Sun expands into a red giant. Though this is expected to be a gradual process, taking billions of years as the Sun ages and the hydrogen fusion in its core diminishes, in this scenario the Sun rapidly ages and expands in the present day.

The Sun gradually becomes hotter as the hydrogen at its core is consumed through nuclear fusion, resulting in the accumulation of helium, which causes the remaining hydrogen to fuse faster to maintain radiation pressure against the sun's gravity. The average global temperature goes up by 36 °F (20 °C). All snow and ice on Earth melts, causing sea levels to rise by more than 200 feet (61 m), submerging coastal cities. Regular temperatures this hot, around 130 °F (54 °C), become difficult for life to handle.

At 212 °F (100 °C), hot enough to boil water, humans and animals are blinded and suffocated as the alveoli in their lungs are cooked. Earth's magnetosphere begins to weaken. Animals without lungs survive longer, but eventually also succumb to the heat. Humans move underground to survive, and to explore the Earth's surface, humans have to wear space suits. At 300 °F (149 °C), water begins to evaporate much faster than it does today. The concentration of water vapor increases in the atmosphere, displacing oxygen, but despite the intense heat, oxygen levels become so low that fires cannot start. Rain evaporates before reaching the ground.

At 700 °F (371 °C), all life on Earth is rendered extinct, even those living underground. All water on Earth evaporates, turning the former ocean floors into salt pans. The air pressure resulting from the vaporized oceans increases to 4,000 pounds per square inch, destroying even pressurized containers. Anything made of plastic or other synthetic materials melts, and concrete deteriorates as the water inside it evaporates explosively, resulting in buildings collapsing into rubble. Oxygen levels eventually shoot back up after the water molecules are split into hydrogen and oxygen due to the sun's increased ultraviolet radiation, and the lighter hydrogen escapes to space. Earth turns red as the new oxygen reacts with the iron in the Earth's crust to produce iron oxide, covering the planet in rust. The return of oxygen also causes spontaneous combustion to consume any remaining flammable materials.

At 2,400 °F (1,320 °C), stone structures such as Stonehenge and the Egyptian pyramids melt, destroying the last remaining proof of human activity on Earth; the Earth's crust melts as well. The Sun eventually enters its red giant phase as the last of its hydrogen is consumed, and temperatures at its core reach the point where the helium begins to fuse. As the Sun expands, Mercury and Venus are swallowed, and Earth's orbit slows. Earth, now a planet-sized ball of molten magma, spirals toward the Sun and is swallowed by it, finally destroying all that's left. The Sun stops expanding before it reaches the orbit of Mars, the sole survivor of the inner planets and now the only rocky planet in the entire solar system. Miraculously, humans - along with a variety of different species from Earth brought along with them - escape extinction aboard space arks, as a portion of humankind was able to escape Earth prior to all life on the planet being rendered extinct. The episode ends with the survivors establishing new settlements on the moons of the gas giant planets, which now lie within the Sun's habitable zone.

== See also ==
- Life After People
- The World Without Us
