= Les U. Knight =

American environmental activist

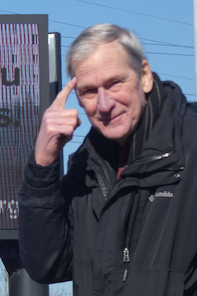
- Les U. Knight (2024)
- Born: c. 1947; Oregon, U.S.
- Occupations: Environmental activist, substitute teacher
- Known for: Founding the Voluntary Human Extinction Movement (VHEMT)
- Movement: Antinatalism, environmentalism

Les U. Knight (born c. 1947) is an American environmental activist and founder of the Voluntary Human Extinction Movement (VHEMT). He advocates for the voluntary cessation of human reproduction to gradually achieve the extinction of humankind, believing this would benefit Earth’s biosphere and prevent human-caused suffering and ecological degradation.

== Early life and education ==
Knight was born during the post–World War II baby boom and raised in a small desert town in Oregon. Experiencing crowded schools and strained resources early in life, he became aware of overpopulation’s effects. After an involuntary stint in the U.S. Army during the Vietnam era, he earned a degree from Western Oregon University in the 1970s. Influenced by environmental concerns and Paul Ehrlich’s The Population Bomb, Knight initially joined Zero Population Growth but soon concluded that total voluntary human extinction was the only sustainable long-term solution.

At age 25, he underwent a vasectomy to ensure he would never have children. He later worked as a high school substitute teacher in Portland, Oregon, while observing environmental degradation during his travels. By the late 1980s, he embraced the idea that avoiding reproduction could reduce humanity’s impact on the Earth.

== Voluntary Human Extinction Movement ==
In 1991, Knight launched the Voluntary Human Extinction Movement (VHEMT) and began distributing a newsletter titled These EXIT Times. Though informal and decentralized, the movement promotes the belief that humans should voluntarily stop reproducing to allow Earth’s ecosystems to recover.

== Public appearances and advocacy ==
Throughout the 1990s and 2000s, Knight appeared at environmental fairs and media outlets to explain VHEMT’s principles. He was interviewed on national television programs, including MSNBC’s The Situation with Tucker Carlson and Fox News’ Hannity & Colmes. He also wrote articles and essays elaborating on VHEMT’s ideology, including a first-person piece in The Guardian where he outlined his motivations.

Knight continues to maintain the VHEMT website and engages with supporters and critics. He has also been profiled by outlets such as The New York Times and The Guardian, which have noted the contrast between his calm demeanor and radical views. Despite controversy, Knight often approaches criticism with humor and reiterates that the movement is about reducing harm through personal choice.
