= Naked Science =

- The second title logo
- Genre: Documentary; Science; Nature
- Narrated by: Eric Meyers and others
- Country of origin: United States
- Original language: English
- No. of seasons: 8
- No. of episodes: 151 (list of episodes)

Production
- Running time: 43-50 minutes
- Production companies: National Geographic Society; Pioneer Productions; Steadfast Television

Original release
- Network: National Geographic Channel
- Release: 2004 – 2011

Naked Science is an American documentary television series that premiered in 2004 on the National Geographic Channel and ran through November 2011. The program featured various subjects related to science and technology. Some of the views expressed might be considered fringe or pseudo-science, and some of the scientists may present opinions which have not been properly peer-reviewed or are not widely accepted within their scientific communities.
