= Aftermath: Population Zero =

- Narrated by: Reg E. Cathey
- Country of origin: Canada

Production
- Running time: 91 minutes

Original release
- Network: National Geographic Channel
- Release: March 9, 2008

Aftermath: Population Zero (also titled Aftermath: The World After Humans) is a Canadian special documentary film that premiered on Sunday, March 9, 2008 (at 8:00 PM ET/PT) on the National Geographic Channel. The program was produced by Cream Productions.

Aftermath depicts what scientists (and others) speculate the earth, animal life, and plant life might be like if humanity no longer existed, as well as the effect that humanity's disappearance would have on the artifacts of civilization. Both documentaries are inspired by Alan Weisman's The World Without Us.

A four-part follow-up TV series called simply Aftermath was created, following what happens under different scenarios.

== Timeline ==
The story begins on Friday, June 13, in an unspecified year. The nature of the show and the appearance of certain vehicles suggest that it takes place in 2008, the year the program was first aired (and when June 13 of that year did indeed fall on a Friday).

A.H. = After Humans

For the sake of simplicity, the story speculates that all of humanity vanished instantly all at once, leaving no trace.

=== (1 second – 1 minute A.H.) ===
Millions of empty cars spin out of control and crash, while others swerve off roads and highways. Other vehicles crash, including buses in Trafalgar Square. All empty vehicles eventually crash, causing crashes all across the globe. The highways are blocked with smashed and burning vehicles. Stationary cars continue to release exhaust fumes into the air until their fuel supplies run out. Cities have begun to cool down by a fraction of a degree. Small aircraft fall out of the sky without human pilots to control them, while larger ones remain in the air, held aloft by their autopilot systems, until their fuel runs out, and they too tumble to the ground.

=== (10 minutes A.H.) ===
Computer systems and machines stay operational. Satellites in orbit communicate with super-computers and continue to transmit information around the globe. While the satellites will stay operational for as long as their solar panels are intact, on Earth machines will only keep going as long as the electricity stays on. Coal-fired power plants run out of fuel. As the power plants shut down, power cuts ensue. Billions of buildings that get their energy from them, such as Las Vegas casinos, fall into darkness. Entire suburbs go dark. Homes, schools, hospitals and cafes are now all without power.

=== (55 minutes A.H.) ===
Certain regions rely on alternative energy sources, like Pennsylvania, which is powered by wind turbines. The turbines are still running, but at the local power station, the controls are unmanned. Computers detect a problem and shut down the system. Pennsylvania is now without electricity.

=== (85 minutes A.H.) ===
At Niagara Falls, Canada, water from the river is diverted into tunnels to turn massive wheels to create power, but now, the tunnels flood with excessive water, and the power station goes offline. Parts of Ontario and New York lose all their power. Televisions, computers, lights, and other machines stop running. Mass blackouts sweep across the globe.

=== (96 minutes A.H.) ===
Within just one day, only nuclear power plants remain operational. The permanent loss of power reaches the nuclear power plants. Computers shut off the reactors and stop the reactions inside, but the nuclear power plants could cause a potential catastrophe.

=== (6 hours A.H.) ===
The last power plants in Europe fail, and the last houses go dark as lights fail. Chemical plants now have no power. Many stored gases require electricity to be cold enough to stay in liquid form. Gas storage tanks heat up until pressure release valves are activated, sending toxic gases into the surrounding environment. Hundreds of thousands of venting tanks cause many animals in the affected regions to die of suffocation.

=== (1–2 days A.H.) ===
Houses and apartments are still inhabited by family pets. The domestic animals are getting hungry. Chained dogs try to get free. Indoors, cats and dogs roam houses, raid refrigerators and cupboards for food and drink water from toilets for sustenance while searching for a way to get out. The global power loss reaches the world's zoos and safari parks, and starving animals test the fences. Without electric fencing to contain them, predators escape and explore this new world.

Also, liquefied natural gas plants are venting gases that reach stationary cars. Eventually, sparks ignite petrol in fuel tanks and the fuel catches fire. This causes huge explosions, igniting multiple fires that will rage for days.

=== (3–5 days A.H.) ===
In London, England, Big Ben rings for the last time. The clock tower needs to be wound every three days to remain ticking, but with no one to wind it, it finally grinds to a halt.

In homes and apartments, domestic pets are starving. Now they must break out of their homes or starve to death. Pet dogs and cats exhaust all the food in their homes and break out to search for more in the streets. Cats are well-suited to life in urban environments, and find success in hunting birds and small animals for food. Sewage treatment facilities fail without electricity, leaving sewage treatment plants useless. Raw sewage begins polluting rivers and lakes. Abandoned dogs struggle to survive.

In farms and pastures all over the world, dairy cows are struggling to survive as their food and water supplies begin to end. In a cruel twist of fate, 90,000 dairy cows are saved from the slaughterhouse, but most of their numbers will die of dehydration. Zoo animals face a similar fate, as many will die trapped in their enclosures.

Additional exotic animals break out of their enclosures through disabled electric fences, resulting in unusual scenes as displaced wildlife begins to populate areas many miles away from their natural ranges. Elephants start pruning trees in suburbs in their search for food, while hardier animals like camels browse on all available vegetation. Lions and tigers fan out into the streets to hunt herds of deer and packs of monkeys, but at first find hunting challenging in the city as they are not adapted for life in an urban setting.

Migratory birds are found to be travelling easier now since electric lights from office towers and skyscrapers do not confuse them anymore.

=== (5–10 days A.H.) ===
As days pass, domestic dogs eat all easily available food and begin to fight among each other for supremacy. The bigger dogs make packs and attack and eat the small ones. Within a week, all toy dogs disappear from Earth. Large packs of dogs also feed on dead penned up cattle.

Security measures in power plants fail. The equipment in the spent fuel buildings adjoining nuclear power plants that maintain the temperature level of the spent nuclear fuel rods will shut down. Spent nuclear fuel for nuclear power plants is generally stored in pools in on-site facilities. Because the fossil fuel powered back up, power generators will run out. At that time, the cooling pools that prevent the spent nuclear fuel from overheating will start to boil since this water is not replenished.

Radioactive steam will vent into the atmosphere due to the water eventually evaporating. The spent fuel will eventually set fire to the building, and the steam pressure will cause the storage facilities to explode, causing a non-nuclear explosion, emitting radiation not only in the immediate area of the plant but around the globe due to winds. The resulting nuclear disasters spread fallout over large areas. This is repeated dozens of times as shutdown nuclear plants and spent fuel houses explode. Radioactive clouds cross the skies and rain carries the radiation to the ground. Most plants and smaller animals within the affected zones die. Larger animals (like deer) flee to unaffected regions, not because they notice the radiation, but because of the lack of food.

=== (10 days – 1 month A.H.) ===
Hungry dogs from cities flee to the countryside to feast on dead dairy cows. Six days after their water and food supplies began ending, dairy cows have completely finished them and died. Now, their rotting carcasses sustain hungry dogs. On the other hand, not all cows are dead. Beef cattle survive and form herds that thrive in places like the North American Great Plains and the open pastures in the middle-eastern U.S.

The last domestic chickens are exterminated by predators, while fowl and waterfowl such as wild goose, game, prairie chickens, cranes and ducks are still alive. Mice and rats take over abandoned supermarkets, where their population explodes thanks to the abundance of food. This pattern will continue for the next few months until the reduction of food and the action of predators like cats regulates their populations again. Squirrels, raccoons, coyotes,s and skunks begin to colonize human buildings.

=== (3 months A.H.) ===
Radiation disappears from the air. In cities, air quality and visibility is improved. Packs of feral dogs roam the countryside. Desperate for food, they attack anything, even escaped elephants, but they don't have any success. Without humans, elephants have no real predators anymore. Meanwhile, the descendants of pet cats are thriving in supermarkets and grocery stores by feasting on mice and rats. The first and second generations of once-domestic animals begin to propagate and populate.

=== (6 months A.H.) ===
Winter begins in the Northern Hemisphere. Zoo animals that cannot survive it, such as elephants, must migrate to southern latitudes or die. Meanwhile, without artificial heating, cockroaches die by the billions. Animals from the forests seek refuge in human homes. During their stay, they damage furniture in the buildings while constructing their own temporary homes to shelter from the cold.

=== (10–12 months A.H.) ===
Spring rains wash away the radioactive particles from the surface and carry it further into the ground, cleaning plants and objects. Meanwhile, new plants and trees remove the artificial CO_{2} from the atmosphere as the new plants and flowers sprout in ruined cities and clean up greenhouses faster than in the human time. Without hunting seasons, animals breed undisturbed. Some species in areas with no natural predators, like the white tail deer, see population booms and expand their distribution to new areas, including former cities. Moss starts to grow over roads. Large carnivores are human shy, but without the lights or noise made by humans they would penetrate urban areas from the nearby hills or reserves and hunt the domesticated animals. Also the houses may make wonderful dens, which means that animals like pumas and tigers would have population explosions. Depending on the area many common species, such as the White tailed deer would have population decreases due to loss of maintained food supply (e.g. lawns, golf courses, gardens) and increased predation.

=== (3 to 15 years A.H.) ===
With no maintenance and the ice of multiple winters, roads appear degraded and cracked. Moss covers their surfaces, and grass grows in the cracks. New trees grow in home gardens. Vehicles and other metallic structures begin to succumb to corrosion that strips away paint and protective coatings, resulting in rust that eats through metal. Many of the 1 billion automobiles will soon degrade into hollow husks.

=== (30 years A.H.) ===
Devastated by solar winds, artificial satellites return to Earth in the form of shooting stars. Some of their pieces make it to the ground and start some fires. These satellites have been spiralling to Earth for the last 30 years but now, with the batteries dead and any stationkeeping fuel expended, atmospheric drag causes them to plummet to the ground.

Roofs on houses collapse, allowing trees to grow in their interior. Many homes begin to collapse and fall apart as rotting walls and timbers succumb to rot and rain damage. Broken window panes that blew out long ago allow in dust and debris. Scoured by hurricane after hurricane, the East Coast of the United States is slowly cleared of buildings. Southern states like Florida are completely swept away. In the ocean, the remains of former ships serve as foundations for the formation of coral reefs.

Cereal fields are turned into grasslands or overrun by expanding forests. The same happens to cities as grass and trees take root on streets and buildings. In New York City, Central Park is getting bigger, taking over Times Square where layers of mounting soil and plant growth cover up automobiles and the surrounding buildings. Panes of window glass fall from buildings to the streets as the clips holding the windows in their frames rust and crack.

Birds of prey such as hawks and eagles make their nests and hunt rodents in skyscrapers. Paint is weathered away after years of exposure to rain. Metal in cars and other human structures is exposed to oxidation and disintegration. Packs of feral dogs roam the crumbling cities while more exotic additions, such as tigers, return and thrive. Large animals are thriving once more in the ruins of cities. Moisture causes concrete to collapse.

In northern cities, gutted skyscrapers and buildings are filled with rainwater and snow. Rain pours through floors and rots ceilings. The changing seasons only adds pressure to the buildings. Rainwater seeps into cracks in concrete columns, pillars, and walls, and then it freezes in winter before thawing again in spring. These repeated freeze-thaw cycles split and crack concrete. Metal bars inside concrete gave it its strength, but when water reaches the bars, they expand and crack the concrete. Finally, the support columns give way and the buildings topple. The upper floors rain down, smashing lower floors until the buildings crumble to the ground. Most buildings suffer the same fate. Skyscrapers around the world begin to collapse. Concrete structures such as train stations begin to fall down as the roofs give way and the support columns break.

=== (60 years A.H.) ===
Sea life has completely recovered from overfishing and thrives. Though there are still dogs, specific dog breeds do not exist anymore, erased by generations of free reproduction, with a wide variety of mixed-breeds and mongrels taking their place formed through natural variation. In Europe, the largely decreased wolf population expands into the countries where it was completely exterminated. Upon reaching the ruins of cities, wolves come into contact with feral dogs, competing with them for food and breeding with them, erasing the last traces of domestication. There they hunt deer that are expanding their territories into cities now overtaken by grasses and tree growth.

=== (75 years A.H.) ===
Most cars have now fallen apart. Synthetic plastic and rubber tires could last for centuries, while the body rusts, and the interior and seats disintegrate and fall apart.

=== (120 years A.H.) ===
The oceans and plants begin scrubbing the Earth clean of anthropogenic carbon dioxide.

=== (150 years A.H.) ===
Winters are colder than in the last days of the human race. Northern cities like Vancouver are slowly buried under layers of building snow and ice. Remains of ships and bridges form dams in the Thames, flooding the ruins of London and turning the British capital back into the swamp it was before and during the early days of the Roman Empire. The Houses of Parliament and the Clock Tower of Big Ben still stand recognisable among the marshy ruins. Cattle and frogs thrive. Imperial Valley, once the biggest producer of fruits in the United States, returns to a sandy desert. The fruits and vegetable crops grown here were irrigated with water pumped in through a pipe system from the Colorado River, but now the piping has been dry for over a century and the crop fields have been lost. The buildings in the region still stand, but all the wheat crops have withered away. Dry winds still maintain most of Las Vegas's buildings intact. After the power went off, the fountains, taps, and pools ran dry, and with only a few inches of rainfall a year, desert sands are beginning to sweep in and engulf the city. They serve as a refuge for vultures and desert lizards now.

=== (200 years A.H.) ===
Excessive water pressure destroys most of the dams on the Colorado River. The Hoover Dam still survives. Over 300 miles behind it, lies the Glen Canyon Dam. In spring, rising temperatures trigger surging floodwater from melting snow and ice that races toward the dam. It reaches the Glen Canyon Dam, the spillways let some of the water out, but the tunnels built into the dam fill with high pressure bubbles that cause high pressure explosions and eat through the dam. Concrete ramps once prevented this, but now they have rusted into wrecks combined with water seeping through the cracks causing erosion. This causes the dam to ultimately collapse. the flood races downstream toward the Hoover Dam. The flood simply flows over the dam, forming a roaring cascade of water that thunders downstream, sweeping away other dams and overwhelming everything in the way. For the first time in centuries, the Colorado River once again reaches the Gulf of California as a flood, not a stream, and revitalizes to a vast estuary full of animal life.

The coast of Louisiana is reshaped as the Mississippi River is freed from the dams' grip. Old codfish reach six feet long. All whale species have recovered to their pre-human populations. Without the interference of noisy naval alarms, they can hear the mating calls of other whales from 2000 miles away. The heavily weathered hulks of large ships appear on beaches all over the world after two centuries of errant journeys over (and under) the waves. Plants and trees eliminate the excess CO_{2} in the atmosphere.

=== (230 years A.H.) ===
Corrosion from rainwater, ice and lightning strikes has completely ravaged the upper half of the Eiffel Tower, and the iron is rusted through and teetering. A strong wind collapses it, and falls into the new marsh on the River Seine that has flooded the remnants of Paris. Thousands of wild boar (descendants of both the domestic pig and wild boar) live under the Tower's legs. The right arm of the Statue of Liberty falls to the ground. The head cracks off and follows the arm some time later. The iron that makes up its skeleton has rusted through, and both parts were too weak to stay up, but its skin of copper plates is cleaner now than before due to cleaner skies and the effects of centuries-worth of rain rinsing away the statue's verdigris patina.

Thick forests of trees over 90 feet tall completely cover the eastern half of North America. Human structures still survive under forest humus. From time to time, rains and rivers wash away humus, uncovering concrete beams, plastics, cellphones and stainless steel objects. Tens of millions of reindeer, bison, cattle and horses make up gigantic herds in the Western North American plains. The Great Sphinx of Giza is buried again in the sands of the Sahara where it will remain well-preserved, just as it had done for thousands of years before it was rediscovered for the first time.

=== (500 years A.H.) ===
Forests return to the state they had 10,000 years ago.

=== (1,000 years A.H.) ===
The Eiffel Tower has lost all but its four legs. The rest of it has fallen down and been covered by soil and vegetation. The Statue of Liberty has fallen to pieces, and only its pedestal still stands, but this concrete pedestal could last thousands of years.

=== (25,000 years A.H.) ===
Earth enters a new Ice Age, and glaciers expand south covering most of the Northern Hemisphere. The last traces of New York City are completely erased. Most species however adapt and thrive; sea lions, ducks, camels, fish, ostriches, lions, tigers, bison, baboons, deer, wolves, horses, cattle, and elephants all adapt alongside many other species. However, evidence left by Moon exploration missions and certain plastic items will survive intact for not only thousands, but millions of years after mankind has vanished. They will be the last legacy of the human race.

== See also ==
- The Future Is Wild
