= The World Without Us =

2007 non-fiction book by Alan Weisman

- Author: Alan Weisman
- Language: English
- Genre: Non-fiction
- Published: July 10, 2007 (St. Martin's Thomas Dunne Books)
- Publication place: United States
- ISBN: 978-0-312-34729-1
- OCLC: 122261590
- Dewey Decimal: 304.2 22
- LC Class: GF75 .W455 2007

The World Without Us is a 2007 non-fiction book about what would happen to the natural and built environment if humans suddenly disappeared, written by American journalist Alan Weisman and published by St. Martin's Thomas Dunne Books. It is a book-length expansion of Weisman's own February 2005 Discover article "Earth Without People". Written largely as a thought experiment, it outlines, for example, how cities and houses would deteriorate, how long man-made artifacts would last, and how remaining lifeforms would evolve. Weisman concludes that residential neighborhoods would become forests within 500 years, and that radioactive waste, bronze statues, plastics and Mount Rushmore would be among the longest-lasting evidence of human presence on Earth.

The author of four previous books and numerous articles for magazines, Weisman had traveled to interview academics, scientists and other authorities. He used quotations from these interviews to explain the effects of the natural environment and to substantiate predictions. The book has been translated and published in many countries. It was successful in the U.S., reaching #6 on the New York Times Best Seller list and #1 on the San Francisco Chronicle Best-Sellers list in September 2007. It ranked #1 on Time and Entertainment Weekly's top 10 non-fiction books of 2007.

== Background ==
Before writing The World Without Us, the author, Alan Weisman, had written four books, including, Gaviotas: A Village to Reinvent the World, in 1998, about the eco-village of Gaviotas in Colombia; and An Echo In My Blood, in 1999, about his family's history immigrating from Ukraine to the United States. He has worked as an international journalist for American magazines and newspapers, and at the time of writing the book was an Associate Professor of Journalism and Latin American Studies at the University of Arizona. The position required him to teach only one class in the spring semester, and he was free to travel and conduct research the rest of the year.

The idea for The World Without Us was suggested to Weisman in 2004 by Josie Glausiusz, an editor at Discover. She had pondered the idea for several years, and asked Weisman to write a feature on the subject after she re-read "Journey through a Doomed Land", an article he published in Harper's Magazine in 1994 about conditions in the Chernobyl area eight years after it was abandoned following the Chernobyl nuclear disaster in 1986. His Discover article, "Earth Without People", published in the February 2005 issue and re-printed in The Best American Science Writing 2006 anthology, describes how nature has thrived in the abandoned Korean Demilitarized Zone and how nature would overwhelm the built environment of New York City.

To expand this into a book, Weisman's agent found an editor and publisher at St. Martin's Press. Among the 23-page bibliography are two articles he wrote for the Los Angeles Times Magazine ("Naked Planet" on the Antarctic ozone hole, and "The Real Indiana Jones" on the Mayan civilization) and one published in the Condé Nast Traveler ("Diamond in the Wild" on diamond mining encroaching on North America's largest wildlife preserve), as well as Discover's "Earth Without People". Additional research saw Weisman travel to England, Cyprus, Turkey, Panama, and Kenya. Interviews with academics quoted in the book include biologist E. O. Wilson on the Korean Demilitarized Zone, archaeologist William Rathje on plastics in garbage, forest botanist Oliver Rackham on vegetative cover across Britain, anthropologist Arthur Demarest on the crash of Mayan civilization, paleobiologist Douglas Erwin on evolution, and philosopher Nick Bostrom on Transhumanism.

== Synopsis ==
The book is divided into 27 chapters, with a prelude, coda, bibliography and index. Each chapter deals with a new topic, such as the potential fates of plastics, petroleum infrastructure, nuclear facilities, and artworks. It is written from the point of view of a science journalist with explanations and testimonies backing his predictions. There is no unifying narrative, cohesive single-chapter overview, or thesis.

Weisman's thought experiment pursues two themes: how nature would react to the disappearance of humans and what legacy humans would leave behind. To foresee how other life could continue without humans, Weisman reports from areas where the natural environment exists with little human intervention, like the Białowieża Forest, the Kingman Reef, and the Palmyra Atoll. He interviews biologist E. O. Wilson and visits with members of the Korean Federation for Environmental Movement at the Korean Demilitarized Zone where few humans have penetrated since 1953.

Weisman tries to conceive how life may evolve by describing the past evolution of pre-historic plants and animals, but notes Douglas Erwin's warning that "we can't predict what the world will be 5 million years later by looking at the survivors". Several chapters are dedicated to megafauna, which Weisman predicts would proliferate. He profiles soil samples from the past 200 years and extrapolates concentrations of heavy metals and foreign substances into a future without industrial inputs. Carbon dioxide levels in the atmosphere and implications for climatic change are likewise examined.

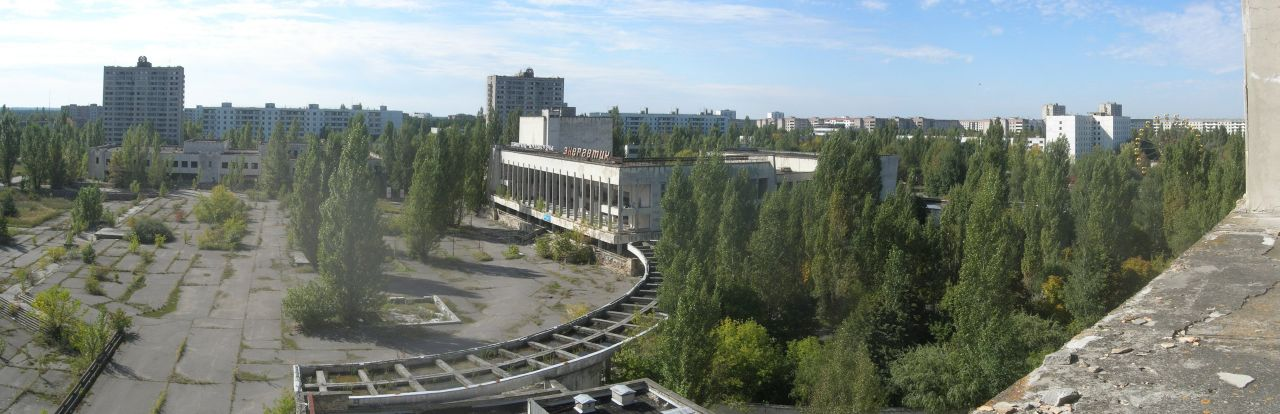
The abandoned city of Pripyat, near Chernobyl

With material from previous articles, Weisman uses the fate of the Mayan civilization to illustrate the possibility of an entrenched society vanishing and how the natural environment quickly conceals evidence. To demonstrate how vegetation could compromise human-built infrastructure, Weisman interviewed hydrologists and employees at the Panama Canal, where constant maintenance is required to keep the jungle vegetation and silt away from the dams. To illustrate abandoned cities succumbing to nature, Weisman reports from Chernobyl, Ukraine (abandoned in 1986) and Varosha, Cyprus (abandoned in 1974). Weisman finds that their structures crumble as weather does unrepaired damage and other life forms create new habitats.

In Turkey, Weisman contrasts the construction practices of the rapidly growing Istanbul, as typical for large cities in less developed countries, with the underground cities in Cappadocia. Due to a large demand for housing in Istanbul much of it was developed quickly with whatever material was available and could collapse in a major earthquake or other natural disaster. Cappadocian underground cities were built thousands of years ago out of volcanic tuff, and are likely to survive for centuries to come.

Weisman uses New York City as a model to outline how an unmaintained urban area would deconstruct. He explains that sewers would clog, underground streams would flood subway corridors, and soils under roads would erode and cave in. From interviews with members of the Wildlife Conservation Society who developed the Mannahatta Project and with the New York Botanical Gardens Weisman predicts that native vegetation would return, spreading from parks and out-surviving invasive species. Without humans to provide food and warmth, rats and cockroaches would die off.

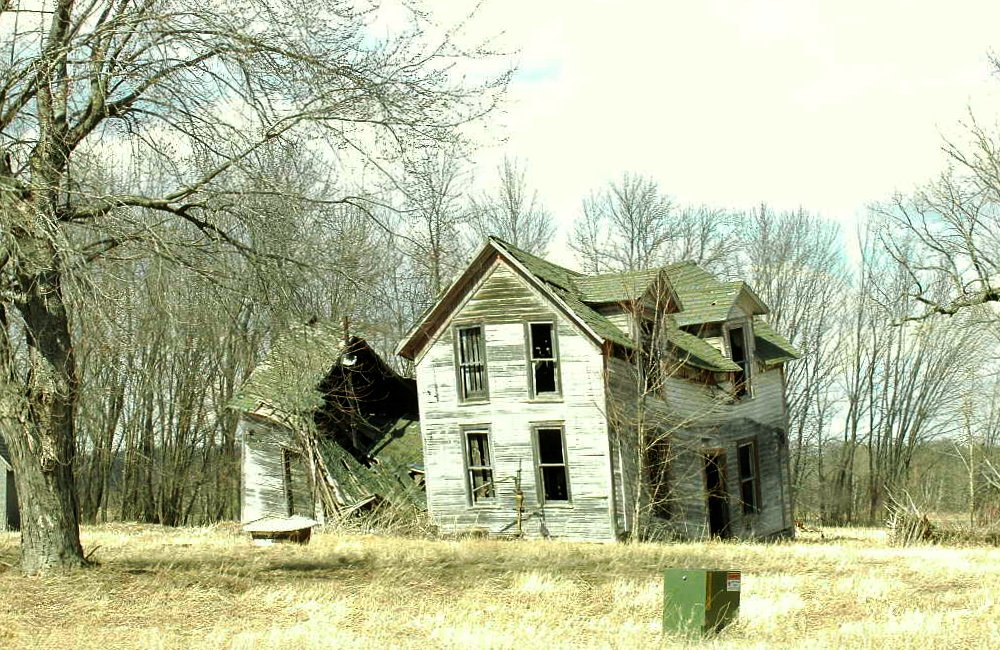
An abandoned house in a state of collapse

Weisman explains that a common house would begin to fall apart as water eventually leaks into the roof around the flashings, erodes the wood and rusts the nails, leading to sagging walls and eventual collapse. After 500 years, all that would be left would be aluminum dishwasher parts, stainless steel cookware, and plastic handles. The longest-lasting evidence on Earth of a human presence would be radioactive materials, ceramics, bronze statues, and Mount Rushmore. In space, the Pioneer plaques, the Voyager Golden Record, and radio waves would outlast the Earth itself.

Breaking from the theme of the natural environment after humans, Weisman considers what could lead to the sudden, complete demise of humans without serious damage to the built and natural environment. That scenario, he concludes, is extremely unlikely. He also considers transhumanism, the Voluntary Human Extinction Movement, the Church of Euthanasia and John A. Leslie's The End of the World: the Science and Ethics of Human Extinction.

Weisman concludes the book considering a new version of the one-child policy. While he admits it is a "draconian measure", he states, "The bottom line is that any species that overstretches its resource base suffers a population crash. Limiting our reproduction would be damn hard, but limiting our consumptive instincts may be even harder." He responded to criticism of this saying "I knew in advance that I would touch some people's sensitive spots by bringing up the population issue, but I did so because it's been missing too long from the discussion of how we must deal with the situation our economic and demographic growth have driven us too (sic)".

== Publication ==
From L to R: The American, Canadian, British, French and Japanese book covers

The book was first published on July 10, 2007, as a hardback in the United States by St. Martin's Thomas Dunne Books, in United Kingdom by Virgin Books and in Canada by HarperCollins. The paperback was released in July 2008. It has been translated and published in Denmark by Borgen as Verden uden os, France by Groupe Flammarion as Homo disparitus, in Germany by Piper as Die Welt ohne uns, in Portugal by Estrela Polar as O Mundo Sem Nós, in Italy by Einaudi as Il mondo senza di noi, in Poland by CKA as Świat bez nas, and in Japan by Hayakawa Publishing as Jinrui ga kieta sekai (人類が消えた世界; "A World where the Human Race has Disappeared").

Pete Garceau designed the cover art for the American release, which one critic said was "a thick layer of sugar-coated sweetness in an effort to not alarm potential readers. 'Yes, I am a book about the environment. But I'm harmless! No, really!'" The Canadian version, designed by Ellen Cipriano, is similar to the American version but with a photo illustration rather than the disarming cartoon illustration. Cover art for the international releases contrast the natural environment with a decaying built environment. Adam Grupper voiced the ten-hour-long, unabridged English-language audiobook which was published by Macmillan Audio and BBC Audiobooks, and released simultaneously with the hardcover book. AudioFile gave the audio presentation its Earphones Award, called Grupper's reading sincere and balanced, and wrote, "Never veering into sensationalism, always objective and phlegmatic, Grupper takes what could be a depressing topic and makes it a book you just can't stop listening to".

== Reception ==
As the book was released Weisman launched his book tour with stops throughout the United States, Canada and overseas to Lisbon and Brussels. Weisman did television interviews on The Daily Show and The Today Show and radio interviews on Weekend Edition, Talk of the Nation, The Diane Rehm Show, Living on Earth, Marketplace, and As It Happens. Meanwhile, the book debuted on the New York Times Best Seller list for non-fiction hardcovers at #10 on July 29 and spent nine weeks in the top ten, peaking at #6 on August 12 and September 9. In the Canadian market, it spent 10 weeks on The Globe and Mail's non-fiction best-seller list, peaking at #3 on August 11. The book reached #1 on the San Francisco Chronicle Best-Sellers list for non-fiction on September 23 and spent 11 weeks on the USA Today's Top 150 Best-Selling Books, peaking at #48. Reviewers at the Library Journal recommended the book for all environmental collections and the audiobook for most public and academic library audiobook collections. The book ranked #1 on Time and Entertainment Weekly's top 10 non-fiction books of 2007 and was listed in the Hudson Booksellers' "Best Books published in 2007". In the Amazon.com "Best Books of 2007", it placed #4 overall in the United States and #1 in the non-fiction category in Canada.

The writing style was positively received as being vivid and well written, sometimes grim, but with appropriate language. Even an overall negative review by Michael Grunwald in The Washington Post remarked the writing was "always lucid, sometimes elegant". In The New York Times Book Review Jennifer Schuessler said Weisman has a "flirtation with religious language, his occasionally portentous impassivity giving way to the familiar rhetoric of eco-hellfire". Janet Maslin of The New York Times found the writing had "an arid, plain, what-if style" while being "strangely uniform in tone". On the reporting techniques, Kamiya wrote that "[Weisman's] science reporting, at once lucid and full of wonder ... is the heart and soul of this book" and that it is "written as if by a compassionate and curious observer on another planet". The Plain Dealer book editor Karen Long said Weisman "uses the precise, unhurried language of a good science writer and shows a knack for unearthing unexpected sources and provocative facts".

Several critics found the lack of an anthropocentric point of view hurt the book's relevance. Robert Braile in The Boston Globe wrote that it has "no real context ... no rationale for probing this fantasy other than [Weisman's] unsubstantiated premise that people find it fascinating". Michael Grunwald in The Washington Post also questioned the premise: "Imagining the human footprint on a post-human planet might be fun for dormitory potheads who have already settled the questions of God's existence and Fergie's hotness, but it's not clear why the rest of us need this level of documentary evidence". On the other hand, Alanna Mitchell in the Globe and Mail review found relevance in the context of society's passiveness to resource depletion combined with an anthropocentric vanity. She writes the "book [is] designed to help us find the how of survival by shaking us out of our passive dance with death".

The book's environmental focus was also criticized by some. Christopher Orlet of The American Spectator wrote that it is "a prime example of the wrongheaded, extremist views of the Greens". Braile agrees that the book could be "an environmentalist's nightmare, possibly fueling the cheap shots taken at the green movement ... by critics who say environmentalists care more about nature than people". Environmentalist Alex Steffen found the book presents nothing new, but that using the sudden and clean disappearance of humans provides a unique framework, although extremely unlikely and insensitive. Two critics who call the book a "Jeremiad" ultimately gave it a positive review. The Guardian says "we learn during the course of this book, to feel good about the disappearance of humanity from the Earth".

Other critics hailed the environmental perspective. Chauncey Mabe of the South Florida Sun-Sentinel calls the book "one of the most satisfying environmental books of recent memory, one devoid of self-righteousness, alarmism or tiresome doomsaying". Tom Spears of the CanWest News Service concludes "it's more a portrait of ourselves, taken through an odd lens" and "[s]ometimes an obituary is the best biography".

== Genre ==
The book is categorized as non-fiction science but some commentators emphasize it may be better described as speculative fiction. The World Without Us is grounded in environmental and science journalism. Like other environmental books, it discusses the impact that the human race has had on the planet. Weisman's thought experiment removes the judgments and sufferings of humans by focusing on a hypothetical post-human world. This approach to the genre, which "throw[s] the spotlight on the earth itself", was found to be creative and objective. There have been other books that address similar topics, such as Gregory Benford's 1999 book Deep Time: How Humanity Communicates Across Millennia. Science fiction writers such as H. G. Wells (The War of the Worlds, 1898) and John Wyndham (The Day of the Triffids, 1951) had earlier touched upon the possible fate of cities and other man-made structures after the sudden removal of their creators. Similar parallels in the decay of civilization are detailed in 1949 post-apocalyptic science fiction novel by Berkeley English professor George R. Stewart, Earth Abides.

Addressing his approach, Weisman said that eliminating the human element eliminated the "fear factor" that people are doing something wrong or that they will die; it is meant to be read as a fantasy, according to the author. Josie Appleton of Spiked related the book to "today's romanticisation of nature" in that it linked "the decadence and detachment of a modern consumerist society" with an ignorance of the efforts required to produce products so easily disposed. Appleton also felt the book countered the "Nature knows best" notion by highlighting the randomness of natural forces.

Weisman's science journalism style uses interviews with academic and professional authorities to substantiate conclusions, while maintaining the "cool and dispassionate [tone] ... of a scientific observer rather than an activist". Weisman said he purposely avoided the activist label: "Some of our finest science and nature writers only get read by people who already agree with them. It's nice to get some affirmation for whatever it is you believe is true, even if it's quite sobering, but I wanted to write something that people would read ... without minimizing the significance of what's going on, nor trivializing it, nor oversimplifying it."

Richard Fortey compares the book to the works of Jared Diamond, Tim Flannery and E. O. Wilson, and writes that The World Without Us "narrowly avoids engendering the gloom-and-doom ennui that tends to engulf the poor reader after reading a catalogue of human rapacity". Mark Lynas in the New Statesman noted that "whereas most environmental books sag under the weight of their accumulated bad news, The World Without Us seems refreshingly positive". Demonstrating the optimism on the grim subject matter Appleton quotes an ecologist from the book saying "if the planet can recover from the Permian, it can recover from the human".

== In popular culture ==
- The Earth After Us explores the geological legacy of the human species
- There Will Come Soft Rains, a 1920 poem by Sara Teasdale
- After Man: A Zoology of the Future considers the evolution of life on Earth 50 million years after the extinction of human beings.
- The plot of Foundation and Earth by Isaac Asimov (a continuation of his Foundation Trilogy), includes Aurora, a habitable planet which was abandoned by people for thousands of years. That planet, however, was settled by people, and its limited ecology was maintained by them, leading to its deterioration in the absence of human beings.

There have been several TV specials relating to the same topic:

- Life After People shows what would happen if humans disappeared instantly.
- Aftermath: Population Zero is the same as the above, but gives more detail into certain things.
- The Future Is Wild, while not seeking to explain our disappearance, shows how life on Earth (without humans) would evolve 5 million, 100 million and 200 million years in the future.

The 2009 hip-hop song "The High Line" by Kinetics & One Love, inspired by The World Without Us, is a pro-green, anti-deforestation song that paints the picture of trees and plants reclaiming the buildings of New York City long after the presence of humans. Like author Alan Weisman, rapper Kinetics uses the High Line railway in Manhattan as an example of nature's potential for reclamation of manmade structures.

The 2013 video game The Last of Us, which takes place twenty years after an apocalyptic event, uses The World Without Us as inspiration for the look of the city settings.

The 2017 video game NieR: Automata, which considers the Earth devoid of humanity for several hundreds of years, draws heavy inspiration from The World Without Us's depictions of cities and former civilisation habitats in its level design.

In 2009 20th Century Fox purchased the rights to the book with the intent of creating a motion picture.
