= Nicholas P. Money =

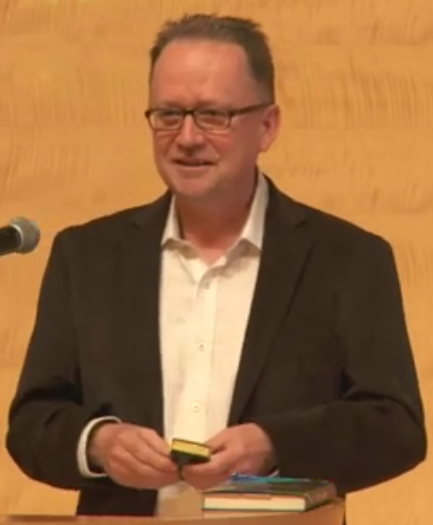
- Speaking about The Amoeba in the Room at the San Francisco Public Library in 2014
- Born: 1962 (age 63–64); England
- Occupations: Mycologist, science writer
- Employer: Miami University

Nicholas P. Money (born 1962) is an English-born mycologist and science writer. He is a professor of biology and a researcher at Miami University in Oxford, Ohio. His main focus is on "the mechanisms of fungal growth and development".

== Works ==
- Carpet Monsters and Killer Spores: A Natural History of Toxic Mold. 2004.
- The Triumph of the Fungi: A Rotten History. Oxford University Press. 2006.
- Mushroom. Oxford; New York: Oxford University Press. 2011. ISBN 9780199732562.
- The Amoeba in the Room: Lives of the Microbes. Oxford University Press. 2014.
- The fungi. Amsterdam: Elsevier. 2016. ISBN 9780123820341. (with Lynne Boddy and Sarah Watkinson)
- Fungi: a very short introduction. Oxford University Press. 2016. ISBN 978-0199688784.
- The rise of yeast: how the sugar fungus shaped civilization. Oxford University Press. 2018. ISBN 9780198749707.
- The Selfish Ape: Human Nature and Our Path to Extinction. University of Chicago Press. 2019. ISBN 978-1789141559.
- Nature Fast and Nature Slow: How Life Works, from Fractions of a Second to Billions of Years. Reaktion. 2021.
- Mushrooms: A Natural and Cultural History. Reaktion Books. 2023.
- Molds, Mushrooms, and Medicines: Our Lifelong Relationship with Fungi. Princeton University Press. 2024.
