= Voluntary Human Extinction Movement =

Environmental movement

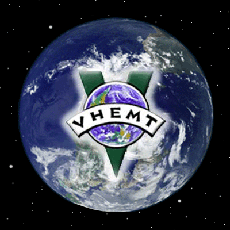
- Formation: 1991
- Type: NGO
- Founder: Les U. Knight
- Website: vhemt.org

The Voluntary Human Extinction Movement (VHEMT (Note: VHEMT is pronounced "vehement", because, according to Knight, that is what they are.)) is an environmental movement that calls for all people to abstain from reproduction in order to cause the gradual voluntary extinction of humankind. VHEMT supports human extinction primarily because it would prevent environmental degradation. The group states that a decrease in the human population would prevent a significant amount of human-caused suffering. The extinctions of non-human species and the scarcity of resources caused by humans are frequently cited by the group as evidence of the harm caused by human overpopulation.

VHEMT was founded in 1991 by Les U. Knight, an American activist who became involved in the American environmental movement in the 1970s and thereafter concluded that human extinction was the best solution to the problems facing the Earth's biosphere and humanity. Knight publishes the group's newsletter and serves as its spokesman. Although the group is promoted by a website and represented at some environmental events, it relies heavily on coverage from outside media to spread its message.

Many commentators view its platform as unacceptably extreme, while endorsing the logic of reducing the rate of human reproduction. In response to VHEMT, some journalists and academics have argued that humans can develop sustainable lifestyles or can reduce their population to sustainable levels. Others maintain that whatever the merits of the idea, the human reproductive drive will prevent humankind from ever voluntarily seeking extinction.

== History ==
The Voluntary Human Extinction Movement was founded by Les U. Knight, (Note: Knight denies that he is the founder, saying that "I'm not the founder of VHEMT, I just gave it a name".) a graduate of Western Oregon University and high school substitute teacher living in Portland, Oregon. After becoming involved in the environmental movement as a college student in the 1970s, Knight attributed most of the dangers faced by the planet to human overpopulation. He joined the Zero Population Growth organization, and chose to be vasectomized at age 25. He later concluded that the extinction of humanity would be the best solution to the Earth's environmental problems. He believes that this idea has also been held by some people throughout human history.

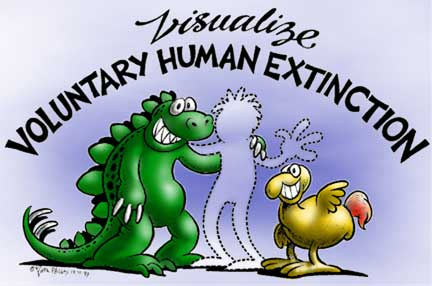
Voluntary Human Extinction Movement cartoon by Nina Paley

In 1991, Knight began publishing VHEMT's newsletter, known as These Exit Times. In the newsletter, he asked readers to further human extinction by not procreating. VHEMT has also published cartoons, including a comic strip titled Bonobo Baby, featuring a woman who forgoes childbearing in favor of adopting a bonobo. In 1996, Knight created a website for VHEMT; it was available in 11 languages by 2010. VHEMT's logo features the letter "V" (for voluntary) and a picture of the Earth with north at the bottom. (Note: VHEMT states that the inverted Earth represents the radical shift in human direction the movement seeks, and notes that upside down emblems are often used as symbols of distress.)

== Organization and promotion ==
VHEMT functions as a loose network rather than a formal organization, and does not compile a list of members. Daniel Metz of Willamette University stated in 1995 that VHEMT's mailing list had just under 400 subscribers. Six years later, Fox News said the list had only 230 subscribers. Knight says that anyone who agrees with his ideology is a member of the movement; and that this includes "millions of people". (Note: On its website, VHEMT characterizes the participants in its movement as "volunteer", "supporter", or "undecided", each of whom share an interest in a reduction in the rate of human births.)

Knight serves as the spokesman for VHEMT. He attends environmental conferences and events, where he publicizes information about population growth. VHEMT's views have, however, primarily been spread through coverage by media outlets, rather than events and its newsletter. VHEMT sells buttons and T-shirts, as well as bumper stickers that read "Thank you for not breeding".

== Ideology ==
Knight argues that the human population is far greater than the Earth can handle, and that the best thing for Earth's biosphere is for humans to voluntarily cease reproducing. He says that humans are "incompatible with the biosphere" and that human existence is causing environmental damage which will eventually bring about the extinction of humans (as well as other organisms). According to Knight, the vast majority of human societies have not lived sustainable lifestyles, and attempts to live environmentally friendly lifestyles do not change the fact that human existence has ultimately been destructive to the Earth and many of its non-human organisms. Voluntary human extinction is promoted on the grounds that it will prevent human suffering and the extinction of other species; Knight says that many species are threatened by the increasing human population.

James Ormrod, a psychologist who profiled the group in the journal Psychoanalysis, Culture & Society, notes that the "most fundamental belief" of VHEMT is that "human beings should stop reproducing", and that some people consider themselves members of the group but do not actually support human extinction. Knight, however, believes that even if humans become more environmentally friendly, they could still return to environmentally destructive lifestyles and hence should eliminate themselves. Residents of First World countries bear the most responsibility to change, according to Knight, as they consume the largest proportion of resources.

Knight believes that Earth's non-human organisms have a higher overall value than humans and their accomplishments, such as art: "The plays of Shakespeare and the work of Einstein can't hold a candle to a tiger". He argues that species higher in the food chain are less important than lower species. His ideology is drawn in part from deep ecology, and he sometimes refers to the Earth as Gaia. He notes that human extinction is unavoidable, and that it is better to become extinct soon to avoid causing the extinction of other animals. The potential for evolution of other organisms is also cited as a benefit.

Knight sees abstinence from reproduction as an altruistic choice – a way to prevent involuntary human suffering – and cites the deaths of children from preventable causes as an example of needless suffering. Knight claims that non-reproduction would eventually allow humans to lead idyllic lifestyles in an environment comparable to the Garden of Eden, and maintains that the last remaining humans would be proud of their accomplishment. Other benefits of ceasing human reproduction that he cites include the end of abortion, war, and starvation. Knight argues that "procreation today is de facto child abuse". He maintains that the standard of human life will worsen if resources are consumed by a growing population rather than spent solving existing issues. He speculates that if people ceased to reproduce, they would use their energy for other pursuits, and suggests adoption and foster care as outlets for people who desire children.

VHEMT rejects government-mandated human population control programs in favor of voluntary population reduction, supporting only the use of birth control and willpower to prevent pregnancies. Knight states that coercive tactics are unlikely to permanently lower the human population, citing the fact that humanity has survived catastrophic wars, famines, and viruses. Though their newsletter's name recalls the suicide manual Final Exit, the idea of mass suicide is rejected, and they have adopted the slogan "May we live long and die out". A 1995 survey of VHEMT members found that a majority of them felt a strong moral obligation to protect the Earth, distrusted the ability of political processes to prevent harm to the environment, and were willing to surrender some of their rights for their cause. VHEMT members who strongly believed that "Civilization [is] headed for collapse" were most likely to embrace these views. However, VHEMT does not take any overt political stances.

VHEMT promotes a more extreme ideology than Population Action International, which argues for population reduction but not extinction. However, the VHEMT platform is more moderate and serious than the Church of Euthanasia, which advocates population reduction by suicide and cannibalism. The 1995 survey found that 36% considered themselves members of Earth First! or had donated to the group in the last five years.

== Reception ==
Knight states his group's ideology runs counter to contemporary society's natalism. He believes this pressure has stopped many people from supporting, or even discussing, population control. He admits that his group is unlikely to succeed, but contends that attempting to reduce the Earth's population is the only moral option.

Writing in the San Francisco Chronicle, Gregory Dicum states that there is an "undeniable logic" to VHEMT's arguments, but he doubts whether Knight's ideas can succeed, arguing that many people desire to have children and cannot be dissuaded. Stephen Jarvis echoes this skepticism in The Independent, noting that VHEMT faces great difficulty owing to the basic human reproductive drive. At The Guardian's website, Guy Dammann applauds the movement's aim as "in many ways laudable", but argues that it is absurd to believe that humans will voluntarily seek extinction. Freelance writer Abby O'Reilly writes that since having children is frequently viewed as a measure of success, VHEMT's goal is difficult to attain. Knight contends in response to these arguments that though sexual desire is natural, human desire for children is a product of enculturation.

The Roman Catholic Archdiocese of New York has criticized Knight's platform, arguing that the existence of humanity is "divinely ordained". Ormrod writes that Knight "arguably abandons deep ecology in favor of straightforward misanthropy". He notes that Knight's claim that the last humans in an extinction scenario would have an abundance of resources promotes his cause based on "benefits accruing to humans". Ormrod sees this type of argument as counter-intuitive, arguing that it borrows the language of "late-modern consumer societies". He faults Knight for what he sees as a failure to develop a consistent and unambiguous ideology. The Economist characterizes Knight's claim that voluntary human extinction is advisable due to limited resources as "Malthusian bosh". The paper further states that compassion for the planet does not necessarily require the pursuit of human extinction. Sociologist Frank Furedi also deems VHEMT to be a Malthusian group, classifying them as a type of environmental organization that "[thinks] the worst about the human species". Writing in Spiked, Josie Appleton argues that the group is indifferent to humanity, rather than "anti-human".

Brian Bethune writes in Maclean's that Knight's logic is "as absurd as it's unassailable". However, he doubts Knight's claim that the last survivors of the human race would have pleasant lives and suspects that a "collective loss of the will to live" would prevail. In response to Knight's platform, journalist Sheldon Richman argues that humans are "active agents" and can change their behavior. He contends that people are capable of solving the problems facing Earth. Alan Weisman, author of The World Without Us, suggests a limit of one child per family as a preferable alternative to abstinence from reproduction.

Katharine Mieszkowski of Salon.com recommends that childless people adopt VHEMT's arguments when facing "probing questions" about their childlessness.

Knight's organization has been featured in a book titled Kooks: A Guide to the Outer Limits of Human Belief. The Guardian journalist Oliver Burkeman said that in a phone conversation Knight seemed "rather sane and self-deprecating". Weisman echoes this sentiment, characterizing Knight as "thoughtful, soft-spoken, articulate, and quite serious". Philosophers Steven Best and Douglas Kellner view VHEMT's stance as extreme, but they note that the movement formed in response to extreme stances found in "modern humanism".

== See also ==
- Antinatalism
- Carrying capacity
- Childfree
- Negative Population Growth
- Object-oriented ontology

== General and cited references ==
- Best, Steven; Kellner, Douglas (2001). The Postmodern Adventure: Science, Technology, and Cultural Studies at the Third Millennium. Guilford Press. ISBN 978-1-57230-665-3.
- Ellis, Richard J. (1998). The Dark Side of the Left: Illiberal Egalitarianism in America. University Press of Kansas. ISBN 978-0-7006-1030-3.
- Ormrod, James S. (2011). "'Making room for the tigers and the polar bears': Biography, phantasy and ideology in the Voluntary Human Extinction Movement". Psychoanalysis, Culture & Society. 16 (2): 142–61. doi:10.1057/pcs.2009.30. S2CID 143980680.
- Weisman, Alan (2010). The World Without Us. HarperCollins. ISBN 978-1-4434-0008-4.
