= Milan M. Ćirković =

Serbian astronomer

Milan M. Ćirković (born 11 March 1971 in Belgrade) is a Serbian astronomer, astrophysicist, philosopher and science book author. He has worked in the fields of astrobiology, global catastrophic risks and future of humanity where he also co-authored with Nick Bostrom. A focus of his work is the Fermi Paradox for which he has critically discussed existing and also proposed novel solutions.
