= Alan Weisman =

American author, professor and journalist

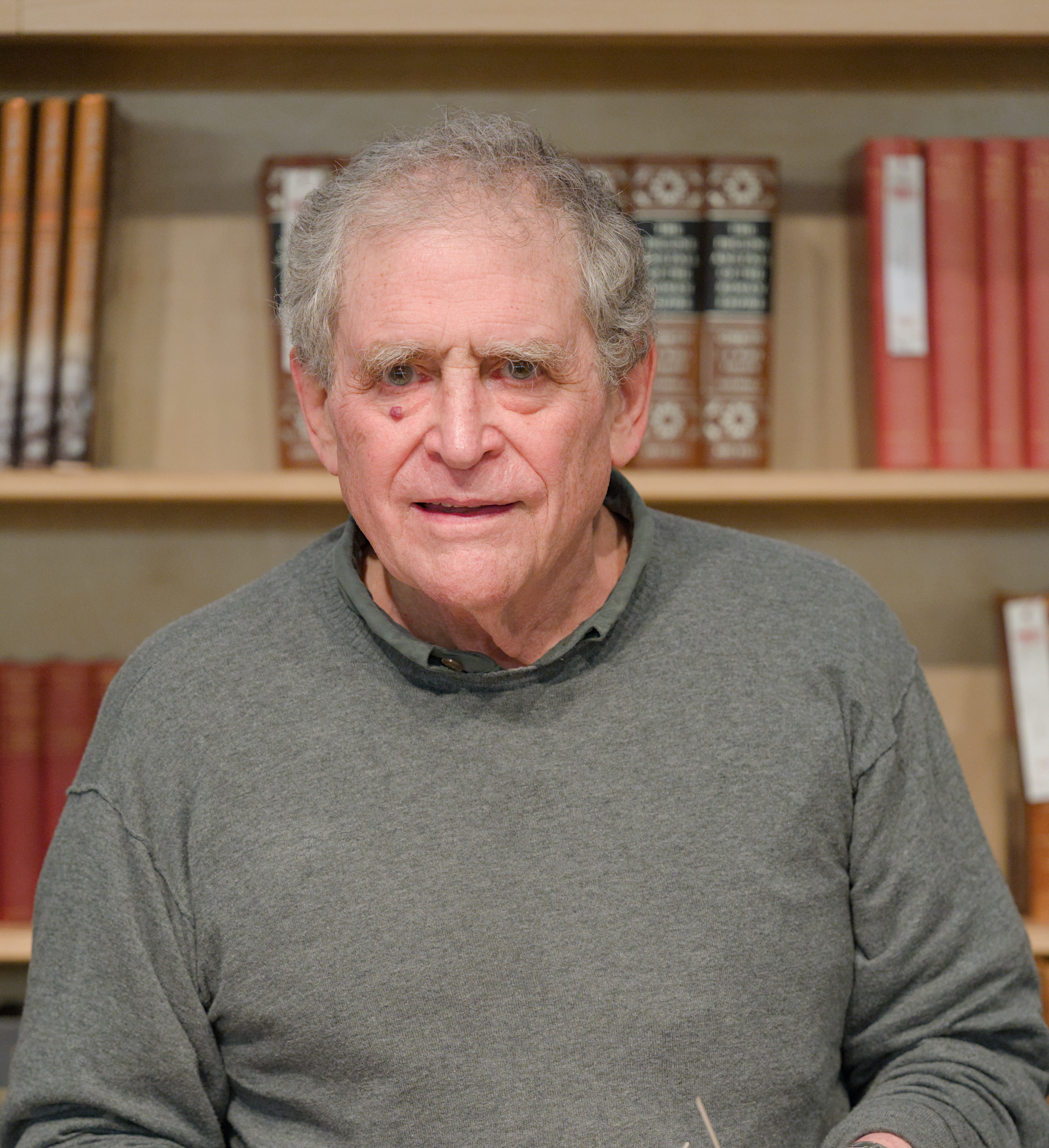
Alan Weisman Portland OR, in 2025

Alan H. Weisman (born March 24, 1947) is an American author, professor and journalist.

== Education and career ==
Weisman was born on March 24, 1947, in Minneapolis, Minnesota. He holds a bachelor's degree in literature and a master's degree in journalism from Northwestern University. From 2004 to 2013, he was Laureate Professor in Journalism and Latin American Studies at the University of Arizona, where he led an annual field program in international field journalism. He has also taught writing and journalism at Prescott College and Williams College and has been a Fulbright Scholar in Colombia.

== Work ==
He has written several books and won numerous international awards for his work in journalism and literature. His works include the critically acclaimed The World Without Us, which describes a post-human scenario of the planet and Countdown: Our Last, Best Hope for a Future on Earth?, was short listed for a Los Angeles Times science and technology book prize. Among his other works are Gaviotas: A Village to Reinvent the World (1998), winner of the Social Inventions Award from the Global Ideas Bank, An Echo In My Blood (1999), La Frontera: The United States Border With Mexico and We, Immortals (1979). His reports from around the world have appeared in Harper's, The New York Times Magazine, the Los Angeles Times magazine, the Atlantic Monthly, Orion, Audubon, Mother Jones, Discover, Condé Nast Traveler, Resurgence and several anthologies, including The Best American Science Writing 2006.

Weisman is also a producer of radio documentaries for Homelands Productions, creating reports for National Public Radio and American Public Media.

== Awards and media attention ==
Among his awards and citations are the Four Corners Award for Best Nonfiction Book, The Wenjin Prize from the National Library of China, a Los Angeles Press Club Award for Best Feature Story, a Best of the West Award in Journalism, a Robert F. Kennedy Journalism Citation, the Unity Media Award, the Brazilian government's Premio Nacional de Jornalismo Radiofonico, and major grants from The Ford Foundation, the Corporation for Public Broadcasting, the Rockefeller Foundation and the MacArthur Foundation. His book The World Without Us was a finalist for the National Book Critics' Circle Award, the J. Anthony Lukas Book Prize, the Orion Prize, and the Rachel Carson Environment Book Award. Countdown won the 2013 Paris Book Festival Prize for nonfiction, the 2014 Los Angeles Times Book Prize, the 2014 Nautilus Gold Book Award, the Population Institute’s 2014 Global Media Award for best book, and was a finalist for the Orion Prize and the Books for a Better Life Award.

Weisman appeared as a guest on The Daily Show on August 21, 2007, and on Real Time with Bill Maher on March 14, 2014.

- 1998 Social Inventions Award, Global Ideas Bank, Gaviotas: A Village to Reinvent the World
- 2007 National Book Critics Circle Award finalist in Nonfiction, The World Without Us
- 2007 Time magazine's Best Books of the Year, Nonfiction #1, The World Without Us
- 2007 Salon Book Award, The World Without Us
- 2008 Book Sense Book of the Year Honor Book, Nonfiction, The World Without Us
- 2008 Orion Book Award Finalist, The World Without Us
- 2008 ALA Notable Books for Adults, The World Without Us
- 2013 Paris Book Festival Prize for nonfiction, Countdown
- 2014 Los Angeles Times Book Prize (Science and technology) winner for Countdown: Our Last, Best Hope for a Future on Earth?
- 2014 Nautilus Gold Book Award, Countdown
- 2014 Population Institute’s 2014 Global Media Award for best book, Countdown
- 2014 Orion Book Award Finalist, Countdown
- 2014 Books for a Better Life Award Finalist, Countdown

== Personal life ==
Weisman lives in Massachusetts with his wife, Beckie Kravetz, who is a sculptor and mask maker.

== Bibliography ==
- 1986 La Frontera: The United States Border With Mexico
- 1998 Gaviotas: A Village to Reinvent the World
- 1999 An Echo in My Blood: The Search for My Family's Hidden Past
- 2007 The World Without Us
- 2013 Countdown: Our Last, Best Hope for a Future on Earth?
- 2025 Hope Dies Last
