= Conway (surname) =

Conway is a Welsh, Irish & Scottish surname. It can be an anglicised spelling of the Welsh Conwy, Irish Mac Connmhaigh, Ó Connmhacháin, McCeannbhuί, Mac Conbhuí, Ó Conbhuidhe or the Scottish Coneway.

In Ireland, derivations of Conway such as McConway as sometimes observed. It translates as follows:

- McCeannbhuί/McConbhuí - Translates as "Son of yellow head/hound", relating to the fact that the Conways were historically footsoldiers that wore a yellow head sash into battle accompanied by war dogs.
- McCeannbhrise - Translates as "Head-smasher/head-breaker", relating to the fact that as footsoldiers of Queen Maeve of Connaught, the Conways carried warhammers into battle as weapon of choice.

Notable people with the surname include:

- Alan Conway, impersonator of Stanley Kubrick
- Albert Conway (1889–1969), Chief Judge of the New York Court of Appeals (1955–1959)
- Andrew Conway (born 1991), Irish rugby union player
- Anne Conway, Viscountess Conway (1631–1679), English philosopher
- Anne C. Conway (born 1950), American lawyer and Senior United States District Judge
- Arthur Conway (disambiguation)
- Connie Conway (born 1950), American politician
- Cornelius Conway Felton (1807–1862), American educator and regent of the Smithsonian Institution
- Curtis Conway, former NFL wide receiver
- Damian Conway, Perl guru
- Dan Conway (born 1985), English cricketer
- David Conway (disambiguation)
- Deborah Conway, Australian singer and songwriter
- Delores Conway, American statistician and economist
- Derek Conway, British politician
- Devon Conway (born 1991), New Zealand cricketer
- Edward Conway, 2nd Viscount Conway, PC (1594–1655), English politician, military commander, bibliophile and peer
- Edward Joseph Conway, Irish biochemist
- Elias Nelson Conway (1812–1892), American politician and 5th Governor of Arkansas from 1852 to 1860
- Marshall "Eddie" Conway (1946–2023), Black Panther Party member from Baltimore
- Edwin Michael Conway (1934–2004), American Catholic bishop
- Elias Nelson Conway, American politician
- Francis Seymour-Conway, 1st Marquess of Hertford (1718–1794), British courtier and politician
- Gary Conway (born 1936), American actor
- George Conway (disambiguation)
- George T. Conway III, American attorney
- Gerry Conway (1952–2026), American comic book writer
- Gerry Conway (musician) (1947–2024), English drummer
- Gordon Conway, English ecologist
- Harry Conway (born 1992), Australian cricketer
- Hélène Conway-Mouret (born 1960), French politician
- Helen Conway-Ottenheimer, Canadian politician
- Henry Seymour Conway, British general and statesman
- Henry Wharton Conway, American politician
- Hugh Conway (novelist) (1847–1885), English novelist
- Hugh Conway (Lord Treasurer) (1440–1518), Irish politician
- Hugh E. Conway (born 1942), American labor economics academic
- Jack Conway (disambiguation)
- James Conway (disambiguation)
- Jerry Conway (1901–1980), American baseball player
- Jill Ker Conway (1934–2018), Australian-American author
- Jim Conway (baseball) (1858–1912), American baseball player
- Jimmy Conway, Irish-American gangster
- John Conway (disambiguation)
  - John Horton Conway (1937–2020), English mathematician
- Jon Conway, American soccer player
- Josephina Conway (born 2004), American fencer
- Kate Conway, Canadian actress
- Katherine Eleanor Conway (1853–1927; pen name, "Mercedes"), American journalist, editor, poet
- Kathie Conway, member of the Missouri House of Representatives
- Kellyanne Conway (born 1967), American Republican campaign manager, strategist, and pollster
- Kevin Conway (disambiguation)
- Kieron Conway (born 1996), English boxer
- Lisa Conway, Canadian musician and producer
- Lyle Conway (died 2026), American actor, puppeteer and designer
- Lynn Conway (1938–2024), American computer scientist and inventor
- Markies Conway, American rapper known professionally as Yella Beezy
- Martin Conway (disambiguation)
- Martin Conway, 1st Baron Conway of Allington (1856–1937), English nobleman
- Melvin Conway, inventor of coroutines
- Mic Conway (born 1951), Australian vocalist
- Michael Conway (senator), Irish politician
- Mike Conway, British racing driver
- Moncure Daniel Conway, American clergyman and author
- Pete Conway (1866–1903), American baseball player
- Robert Conway (admiral), officer in the United States Navy
- Rob Conway, American professional wrestler
- Robert Seymour Conway, British classical scholar and philologist
- Russ Conway (1925–2000), stage name of Trevor Stanford, English popular music pianist
- Russ Conway (journalist), American investigative journalist
- Sally Conway (born 1987), Scottish judoka
- Samuel Conway American researcher and owner of Anthrocon
- Sean Conway, Canadian professor
- Shirl Conway, stage and television actress
- Simon Conway Morris FRS (born 1951), English palaeontologist, evolutionary biologist, and astrobiologist
- Sophie Conway (born 1999), Australian rules footballer
- Steve Conway (politician) (born 1944), American politician
- Steve Conway (singer) (1920–1952), British singer
- Thomas Conway, soldier in America's Revolutionary War
- Thomas F. Conway (1862–1945), American lawyer and politician
- Tiger Conway Sr. (1932–2006), American professional wrestler
- Tim Conway (1933–2019), American comedic actor
- Tim Conway Jr., American radio talk show host
- Timothy Conway (born 1942), Irish politician
- Tom Conway, British actor
- William Conway (disambiguation)
- Zoë Conway, Irish violinist

Fictional characters:

- Hugh Conway, protagonist of James Hilton's novel Lost Horizon
- Conway family, characters in Accidents Happen
- Jimmy Conway, gangster associate in crime film Goodfellas, based on Jimmy Burke
- Will Conway, Republican nominee for U.S. president on season 4 of House of Cards, played by Joel Kinnaman

Conway is a component of the compound surname Conway Morris:

- Simon Conway Morris, British palaeontologist
