= All Tomorrows =

2006 book by C. M. Kösemen

- Original 2006 cover. It depicts a "Bug Facer" (center) and two of its genetically modified descendants.
- Author: C. M. Kösemen
- Language: English
- Genre: Science fiction Speculative evolution Body horror
- Publisher: Time Publishing (Thailand); Wilton Square Books (UK); Kara Karga Yayınları (Turkey)
- Publication date: 4 October 2006 (online); March 2024 (Thai edition); November 2025 (English edition); April 2026 (Turkish edition)
- Publication place: Turkey
- Pages: 111

All Tomorrows: A Billion Year Chronicle of the Myriad Species and Mixed Fortunes of Man is a 2006 science fiction and speculative evolution book written and illustrated by the Turkish artist C. M. Kösemen under the pen name Nemo Ramjet. It explores a hypothetical future path of human evolution set from the near future to a billion years from the present. Several future human species evolve through natural means and through genetic engineering, conducted by both humans themselves and by a mysterious and superior alien race called the Qu.

Inspired by the science fiction works of Olaf Stapledon and Edward Gibbon's The History of the Decline and Fall of the Roman Empire, Kösemen worked on All Tomorrows from 2003 to the publication of the book as a free PDF file online in 2006. Kösemen has announced the first English-language print edition of All Tomorrows in physical form, with new text, updated illustrations, and grammatical fixes. The first English print edition was published in November 2025.

== Summary ==
Centuries after humankind terraforms and colonizes Mars, a brief but catastrophic interplanetary war takes place between Mars and Earth, costing both parties billions of lives. The two planets eventually make peace with each other, launching a wide-scale colonization initiative. Through genetic modification, the humans of Earth and Mars create the "Star People", a new species of human suited for space travel. The Star People proceed to explore and colonize planets across the Milky Way Galaxy.

During this Golden Age, the Star People discover numerous species of alien animals on planets they colonize. Initially believing that humans are the only intelligent species in the Milky Way, this belief is shattered when the Star People find fossils of a feathered dinosaur on a colonized world that is later determined to be a descendant of Therizinosaurus, revealing that humans are not the only intelligent species in the Milky Way, and that aliens had visited Earth before. Some Star People take this as a sign of a divine being, while others see this as evidence of an advanced alien intelligence. Humanity begins preparing for an invasion, creating superweapons capable of destroying planets.

Some time later, humanity (now exclusively made up of the Star People) encounter a malevolent and superior alien force called "the Qu". The Qu's religion motivates them to remake the universe as they see fit through genetic engineering. A short and brutal war follows in which humanity is defeated. The Qu bioengineer the surviving humans as punishment into a range of exotic forms, many of them unintelligent and animalistic. After 40,000,000 years of domination, the Qu leave the galaxy, leaving the altered humans scattered throughout the Milky Way, left to evolve on their own through natural selection. The bioengineered humans range from worm-like beings and insectivores to a species of cell-like human engineered to be a living water treatment system. The book follows the progress of these new humans as they either go extinct or regain sapience in wildly different forms, gradually discovering that the Qu experimented on them.

A sentient posthuman species named the "Ruin Haunters" uses abandoned Star People technology on their world to build their civilisation and wage wars, then resort to transhumanism after their planet's star begins to expand into a red giant. Eventually, the Ruin Haunters fully replace their biological bodies and rechristen themselves as the "Gravitals", a race of sentient robots. The Gravitals build a galaxy-spanning empire while annihilating most life within it, including the other post-human species (except the "Bug Facers", who—like how the Qu treated humanity—are genetically modified by the Gravitals for their own gain). The Gravitals are eventually defeated by the "Asteromorphs", descendants of humanity who escaped the Qu, who then proceed to liberate the Bug Facers and further modify the Gravitals into the less aggressive "New Machines". The final chapters of the book detail humanity's rebound as a posthuman species, their first contact and interactions with a race of aliens from a neighboring galaxy—the "Amphicephali"—and a brief mention of the defeat of the Qu, concluding with the rediscovery of Earth 560,000,000 years in the future.

All Tomorrows ends with a picture of the book's in-universe author—an alien researcher—holding a billion-year-old human skull and writing that all post-human species disappeared a billion years in the future for unknown reasons. The author goes on to state that mankind's story has always been about the lives of humans themselves, not major wars and abstract ideals, concluding by encouraging the reader to: "Love Today, and seize All Tomorrows!"

== Development ==
Kösemen worked on All Tomorrows from 2003–2006. The work of Olaf Stapledon, particularly Last and First Men (1930) and Star Maker (1937), served as the main inspiration for the work, alongside Edward Gibbon's The History of the Decline and Fall of the Roman Empire.

All Tomorrows is written in the style of a historical work, narrated by an alien creature recounting the history of humanity. According to Kösemen, the: "tone of voice is a high school student fanboying on the Decline and Fall of the Roman Empire by Edward Gibbon". The artwork is also reflective of this "archaeological" approach, with faded and textured visual effects applied to the paintings. The original reason for adding the faded tint to the paintings was Kösemen wanting to avoid the paintings looking like "horrible racist caricatures".

The book was released for free online as a PDF on 4 October 2006 and has since then, per Kösemen himself, "had a life of its own as a PDF floating around the backwaters of the internet like a ghost ship". One of the common links which All Tomorrows has been shared through is a wiki site dedicated to speedrunning.

The first licensed physical edition of All Tomorrows was published by Time Publishing in March 2024, in the Thai language. This edition included the content of the original 2006 book, with a new chapter on the making of the book and some additional artwork by other artists.

All Tomorrows has been physically published in English. In July 2024 preorders on the crowdfunding site Unbound began for official hardback and e-book editions in the English language, including additional materials and artwork and the intent to publish 20/21 August 2025. In May 2025, Unbound filed for liquidation leaving the book unreleased, causing controversy among fans as many did not receive a refund. On August 22nd 2025, Kösemen announced that Wilton Square had acquired the publishing rights for the book and would be releasing a full print run in addition to honouring pre-orders. It released in November 2025.

== Reception and legacy ==
Originally an obscure work, All Tomorrows slowly gained popularity online following its 2006 publication. In a 2021 podcast interview, Kösemen noted that the generation born right after him (Kösemen having been born in 1984) "really embraced" All Tomorrows, which he believes might partially be due to the "myriad disasters" that have happened in the world since then. The book has received some scholarly attention; in 2020, All Tomorrows was among the works discussed in Jörg Matthias Determann's book Islam, Science Fiction and Extraterrestrial Life, which explores astrobiology and science fiction in the Muslim world. Following the upload of an abridged version of the book's story by YouTuber Alt Shift X in June 2021, All Tomorrows saw a particular surge in popularity online during the summer of 2021. Among other things, there was a surge of internet memes based on the book, primarily on YouTube and Twitter, as well as fan art based on the creatures in the book.

Readers have characterized All Tomorrows as "bizarre", "inexplicable", "interesting", and "fascinating", and as a work incorporating body horror. Ivan Farkas of Cracked.com called All Tomorrows "existentially freak-ay" in 2021 and described the artwork as "otherwordly". A 2022 article by Andrea Viscusi on the Italian media website Stay Nerd compared All Tomorrows to Man After Man (1990) by Dougal Dixon, also a work tackling future human evolution, but found the depictions in All Tomorrows to be "even more disturbing", yet still possible on an "almost subliminal level" to "recognize as our fellow men". In a 2022 article in the lifestyle magazine A Little Bit Human, Allia Luzong considered All Tomorrows to be a "fun exploration of what could be" but also a serious work with serious themes, particularly noting how humanity's social ills are present throughout the narrative.

Kösemen stated in 2021 that though the book had grown popular, he had almost "disowned" All Tomorrows, finding parts of it "a bit cringey". When designing his website and including his different books and projects, Kösemen purposefully left out All Tomorrows. Following the summer of 2021, he has since added the book to his website and intends to eventually publish All Tomorrows in physical form with new text and illustrations. By 16 October 2022, Kösemen had written the expanded version up until the Qu's conquest of the galaxy. Kösemen stated that the material up until that point amounted to 200 pages, almost twice the length of the entire original book. Kösemen continues to work on the expanded version as of 2024. In April 2024 he has announced the release of a physical copy of the book, but only in Thai language. Although being the original version of the book, it is stated to comprehend a few illustrations made by other artists and a new chapter, with various informations about the species. This new chapter is only available in Thai. At the same time, Kösemen has also stated that he is continuing his work on the new version of the book, that has now reached nearly over 300 pages, with still many species to talk about. Every species has now a deeper lore, and new major plot twists have been added.

== See also ==
- Transhuman
- Posthuman
- Biopunk
- All Yesterdays (2012) by John Conway, Darren Naish and Kösemen – a similarly titled book on paleoart, co-authored by Kösemen.
- Man After Man (1990) by Dougal Dixon – a similar book about (human) speculative evolution
