= Robert Conway =

Robert Conway may refer to:

- Robert Conway (admiral), United States military officer
- Robert Conway (director) (born 1979), American director
- Robert Seymour Conway (1864–1933), British classical scholar and comparative philologist
- Robert Conway, hero of Lost Horizon
- Rob Conway (born 1974), American professional wrestler
