= James Conway =

James, Jim, or Jimmy Conway may refer to:

== Sports ==
- James Conway (Gaelic footballer) (born 1981), Irish Gaelic football player
- James Conway (hurler), Irish hurling player
- James P. Conway (1910–1984), American Hall of Fame racehorse trainer
- Jim Conway (baseball) (1858–1912), American Major League Baseball player
- Jim Conway (footballer) (1925–2003), Australian rules football player and coach
- Jimmy Conway (footballer) (1946–2020), Irish soccer player and coach
- James Conway (Loughmacrory), Irish Gaelic Footballer and Athletics Sportsperson

== Media and arts ==
- James Conway (musician), Irish-American harmonica player
- James L. Conway (born 1950), American television director, writer, producer
- Jim Conway (musician), Australian harmonica player
- James Conway, birth name of British actor James Atherton
- Jimmy Conway, character in 1990 film Goodfellas, portrayed by Robert De Niro and based on the real life gangster James Burke

== Politics ==
- James F. Conway (1932–2025), 41st Mayor of St. Louis, Missouri
- James Sevier Conway (1798–1855), first Governor of Arkansas
- Jim Conway (trade unionist) (1915–1974/16–1974), British trade unionist

== Military ==
- James T. Conway (born 1947), U.S. general, 34th Commandant of the Marine Corps
