= Snaiad =

Speculative evolution project

The 'Kahydron' (Kahydron libanesiensis), an apex predator and one of Snaiad's signature creatures. Painting by C. M. Kösemen.

Snaiad is a speculative evolution, science fiction, and artistic worldbuilding project by Turkish artist C. M. Kösemen, focused on a fictional exoplanet of the same name. Begun in the early 2000s and inspired by earlier works such as Wayne Barlowe's 1990 book Expedition, Kösemen has produced hundreds of paintings and sketches of creatures of Snaiad, with detailed ecological roles and taxonomic relationships to each other. The sheer number of invented creatures and lineages makes Snaiad one of the most biologically diverse fictional worlds.

Since Snaiad artwork was first published by Kösemen online, the project has garnered a following and international attention, especially online. Fans of Snaiad have produced fan art, not only of Kösemen's own creatures but also of their own imagined Snaiadi creatures, consistent with the biological principles followed by the rest of the project's lifeforms. Kösemen hopes to eventually publish the project in book form.

== Premise ==
Snaiad is an exoplanet slightly larger than Earth located outside of the Milky Way. The planet is home to a large variety of fauna, which Kösemen has designed and meticulously documented, along with creating maps and a geopolitical story of Snaiad as it undergoes the process of human colonization about 300 years in the future, Snaiad being one of Earth's first interstellar colonies.

According to science writer Darren Naish, Snaiad "might well break the record as goes the number of fictional entities invented so far" due to the sheer number of lineages and lifeforms designed by Kösemen. The equivalents of tetrapods on Snaiad, so-called 'para-tetrapods' have two "heads"; the first head, typically most similar to heads on Earth animals, is a modified set of genitalia which is also used to catch or grab food, and the second head, located below, has only a digestive function. The 'para-tetrapods' of Snaiad have hydraulic muscles (i.e., powered by fluids being pumped in and out) and their skeletons are not made of calcium, but a carbon-based mixture more similar to very hard wood. The bones of Snaiad creatures are usually black, brown, or green and can catch fire at high temperatures, as they are composed of a hypercompressed hydrocarbon rather than hydroxyapatite, like those of earth tetrapods.

Just as with Earth animals, the creatures of Snaiad are classified into different taxonomic groupings, such as the "Allotauriformes" (large and armoured herbivores), the "Cardiocetoida" (whale-like aquatic creatures with jet propulsion), and the "Kahydroniformes" (intelligent predators with hooves and claws). One of the most successful and widespread predators of Snaiad is the Kahydron, with forelimbs strengthened with claws and hooves. The hydraulic muscles of the Kahydron stretch to its cheekbones, which gives it an exceptionally strong bite. Other than the human colonists, there are no sapient lifeforms on Snaiad. According to Kösemen: 'intelligence is not a "goal" of the evolutionary process, nothing is.' While there are phyla besides the 'para-tetrapods' of Snaiad, such as the arthropod-like Trilateralans, mollusk-like Mullojiforms, and the Arthrognathans, the website only goes into detail about the tetrapod clades.

== Project history ==
Snaiad was inspired by Wayne Barlowe's 1990 book Expedition, which describes the exploration and the wildlife of an alien world. Other inspirational works included Gert van Dijk's "Furaha" (a similar project focusing on an alien world), the art of Terryl Whitlatch, James Gurney's Dinotopia book series, and the works of naturalist painters, such as John James Audubon. The first steps to beginning the project were taken in 2004 or 2005, when Kösemen, still a student, began drawing alien creatures. Kösemen initially called the fictional planet 'Snai 4'. As Kösemen produced more sketches and eventually paintings, ecological niches and relationships between the animals materialized almost on their own; according to Kösemen, "It evolved organically. I corrected things and added new ones. It was more evolution than design!"

Kösemen worked "non-stop" on Snaiad until 2007, though work on the project has continued sporadically after that. Snaiad's official website was launched in June of 2008. The Snaiad website would later go offline for many years, but was relaunched in 2014. Later that year, in August, Kösemen held a talk about Snaiad at the 72nd World Science Fiction Convention in London. At the talk, Kösemen discussed the development of the project and shared never-before-seen early renditions of creatures. By the time of the 2014 talk, Kösemen had around 200 colorful paintings of Snaiad creatures and a backlog of nearly 500 concepts.

Despite not yet having been published in any other form than online, Snaiad has garnered a following. 'Snaiad' has more Google search hits than Kösemen's own name, and the project grew especially popular on the art-sharing website DeviantArt, where amateur artists drew fan art of Kösemen's creatures and also invented their own Snaiadi creatures. Fans of Snaiad have also created YouTube animations and digital as well as physical models of Kösemen's creatures. Per Darren Naish, writing in response to Kösemen's 2014 talk, "The mass appeal of Snaiad was demonstrated by the invention of Spore versions of Snaiad creatures, by the number of website mentions, by fan-art of assorted genres, and by the enthusiasm of the attending audience." Kösemen attributes the appeal of Snaiad to the project being somewhat "open source", with Kösemen allowing fan art and even 'canonizing' the fan creations he liked the best, and the established common body plans and anatomy, creating the possibility of consistent creations. The project as also been translated into multiple languages: As of 2026, the website's home page contains links to versions of the website in Spanish and Mandarin Chinese.

Kösemen has expressed interest in eventually publishing Snaiad in book form, stating that he plans to remake the book completely, and publish it in the near future. He is actively rewriting the book at the current time of writing this document.
