= John Conway (disambiguation) =

John Horton Conway (1937–2020) was an English mathematician at Princeton University, United States.

John Conway may also refer to:

== Academia ==
- John Conway (astronomer) (born 1963), British radio astronomer
- John Conway (surgeon) (1859–1894), Scottish surgeon
- John B. Conway (1939–2024), American mathematician of functional analysis at George Washington University, U.S.
- John S. Conway (historian) (1929–2017), at the University of British Columbia, Canada
- John Horton Conway, an English mathematician

== Arts and entertainment ==
- John S. Conway (artist) (1852–1925), American artist and sculptor
- John Conway (palaeoartist), Australian illustrator
- John Conway (born 1977), keyboardist for The Bravery
- John Conway (1922–2003), voice of puppet Uncle Chichimus in Canadian TV series Let's See

== Politics ==
- John Conway (died 1579), MP for Flint Boroughs and Flintshire
- Sir John Conway, 2nd Baronet (1663–1721), of the Conway baronets, MP for Flintshire and Flint Boroughs
- John R. Conway (1825–1896), American politician and mayor of New Orleans

== Sports ==
- John Conway (cricketer) (1842–1909), Australian cricketer and team manager
- John Conway (footballer, born 1951), Irish footballer
- John Conway (Gaelic footballer) (fl. 1968), Gaelic footballer from County Laois, Ireland
- John Conway (boxer) (born 1968), New Zealand boxer

== Other people ==
- John J. Conway (fl. 1907–1931), American developer in Texas
- John Berchmans Conway (née Bernadette Conway; 1929–2022), Irish Roman Catholic nun working in Pakistan
- John Edwards Conway (1934–2014), U.S. federal judge

== See also ==
- Jack Conway (disambiguation)
- Jon Conway (born 1977), American soccer goalkeeper
