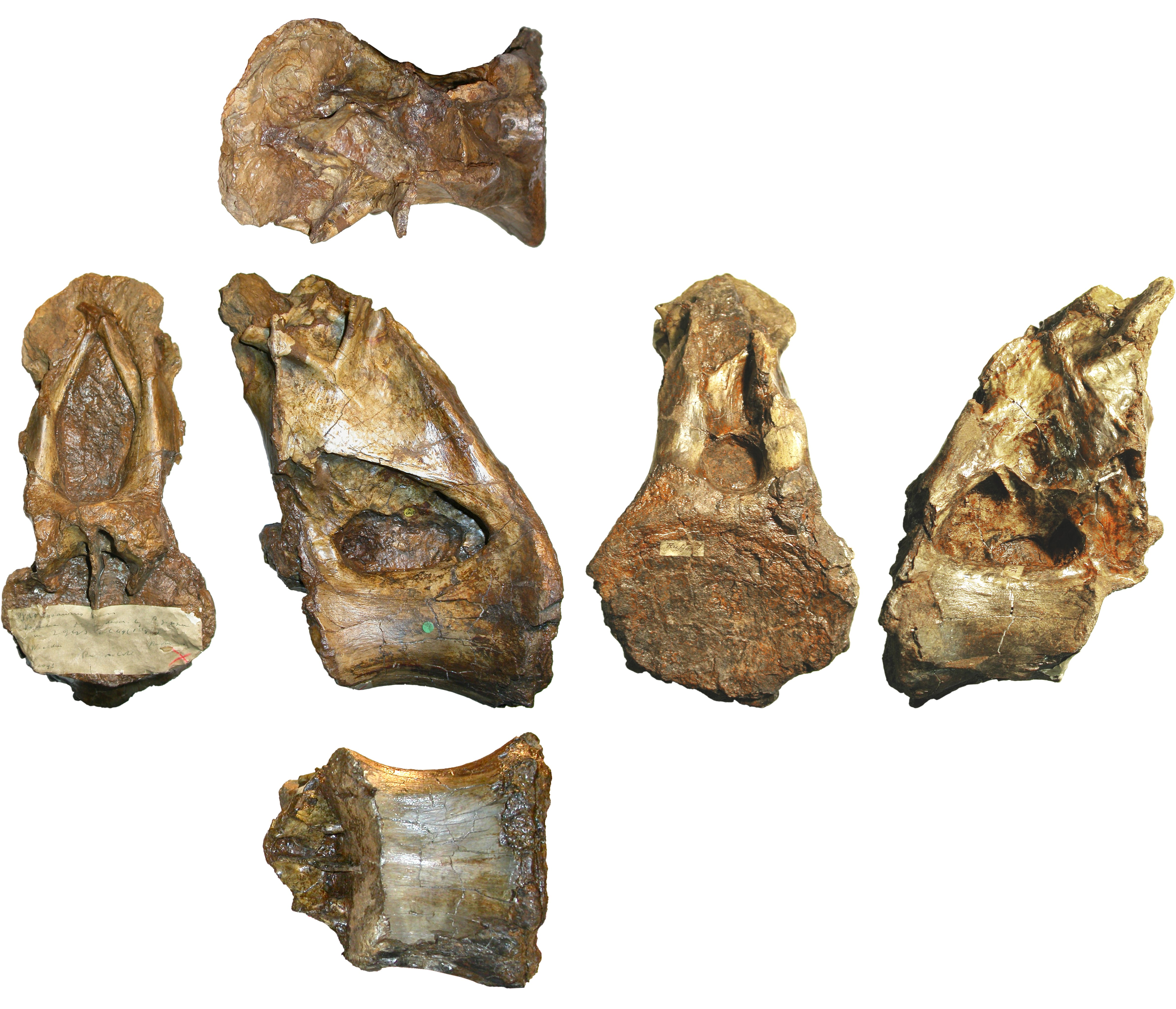
- Holotype vertebra in multiple views

Scientific classification
- Kingdom: Animalia
- Phylum: Chordata
- Class: Reptilia
- Clade: Dinosauria
- Clade: Saurischia
- Clade: †Sauropodomorpha
- Clade: †Sauropoda
- Superfamily: †Diplodocoidea
- Family: †Rebbachisauridae
- Genus: †Xenoposeidon; Taylor & Naish, 2007
- Species: †X. proneneukos

Binomial name
- †Xenoposeidon proneneukos Taylor & Naish, 2007

= Xenoposeidon =

Xenoposeidon Temporal range: Early Cretaceous,140 Ma

Extinct genus of dinosaurs

Xenoposeidon (meaning "strange or alien Poseidon", in allusion to Sauroposeidon) is a genus of rebbachisaurid sauropod dinosaur from the Early Cretaceous of England, living about 140 million years ago. It is known from a single partial vertebra with unusual features, unlike those of other sauropods. This bone was first discovered in the early 1890s but received little attention until it was found by University of Portsmouth student Mike Taylor, who formally described and named it in 2007 with Darren Naish.

== Description ==
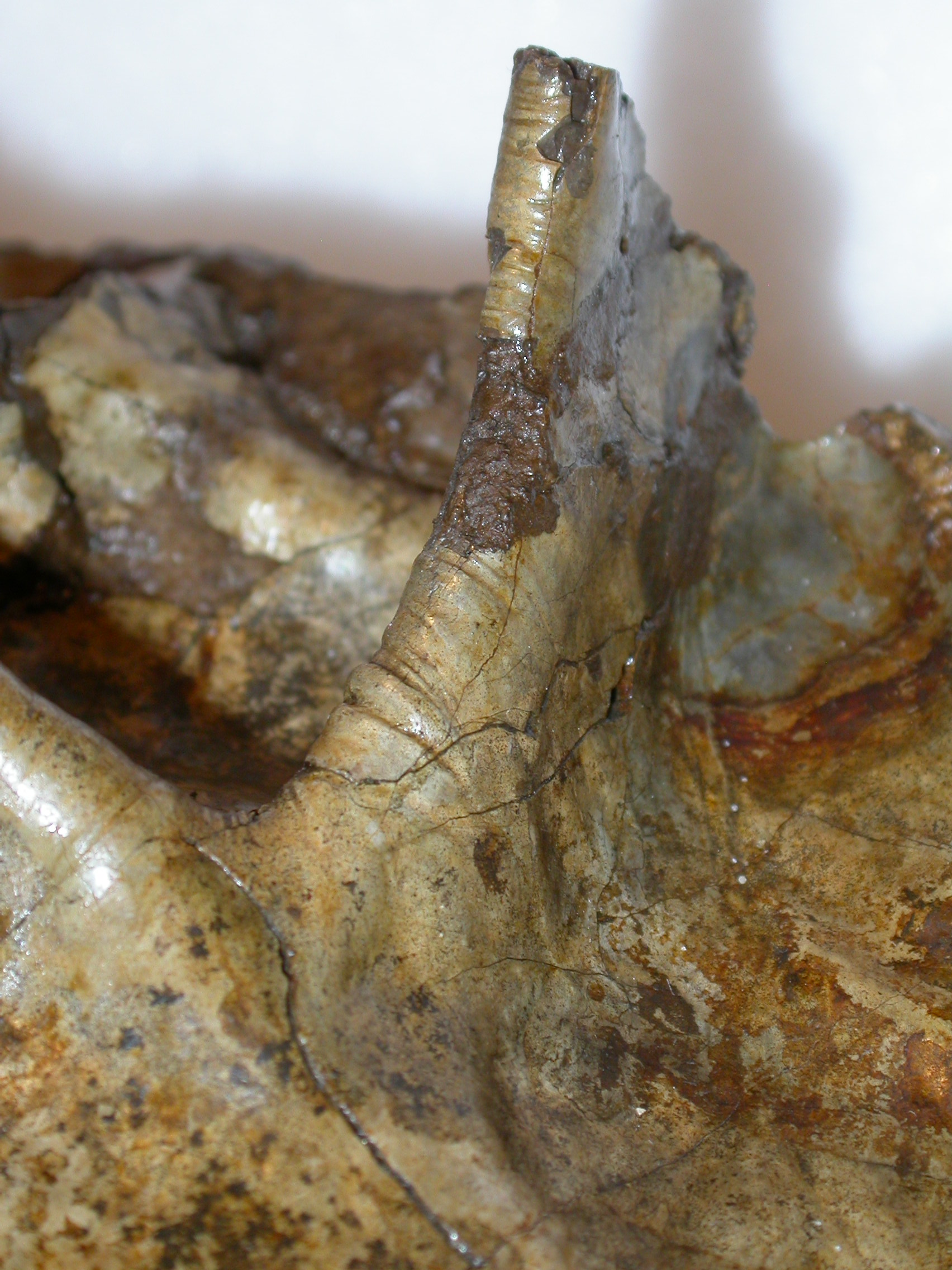
Close up of v-shaped laminae on NHMUK R2095. The feature of the wrinkles are unknown

Xenoposeidon is based on BMNH R2095, a partial posterior back vertebra. The specimen lacks the anterior face of the centrum and the upper portion of the neural arch. The centrum is estimated at 200 millimetres (7.9 inches) long, and the height of the preserved portion of the vertebra is 300 millimetres (12 inches). The average diameter of the posterior face of the centrum is 165 millimetres (6.5 inches), with a concave surface. This concavity is deep enough to suggest that the anterior faces of vertebrae from this part of the dinosaur's spine would have been convex to articulate with such a shape.

The specimen displays several distinguishing characteristics. The base of the neural arch covers the length of the centrum and is continuous with the centrum's posterior face. The neural arch leans anteriorly at 35° and there are broad areas of featureless bone on the lateral surfaces of the arch. The neural canal is large and teardrop-shaped anteriorly but small and circular at its posterior opening. The various bony struts and sheets that make up the arch have a distinctive configuration.

== Classification ==
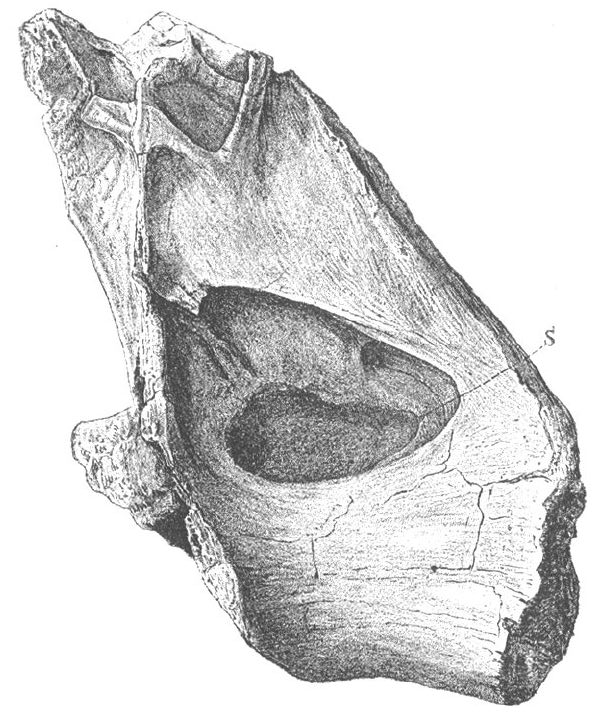
Illustration of the vertebra by Richard Lydekker in 1893

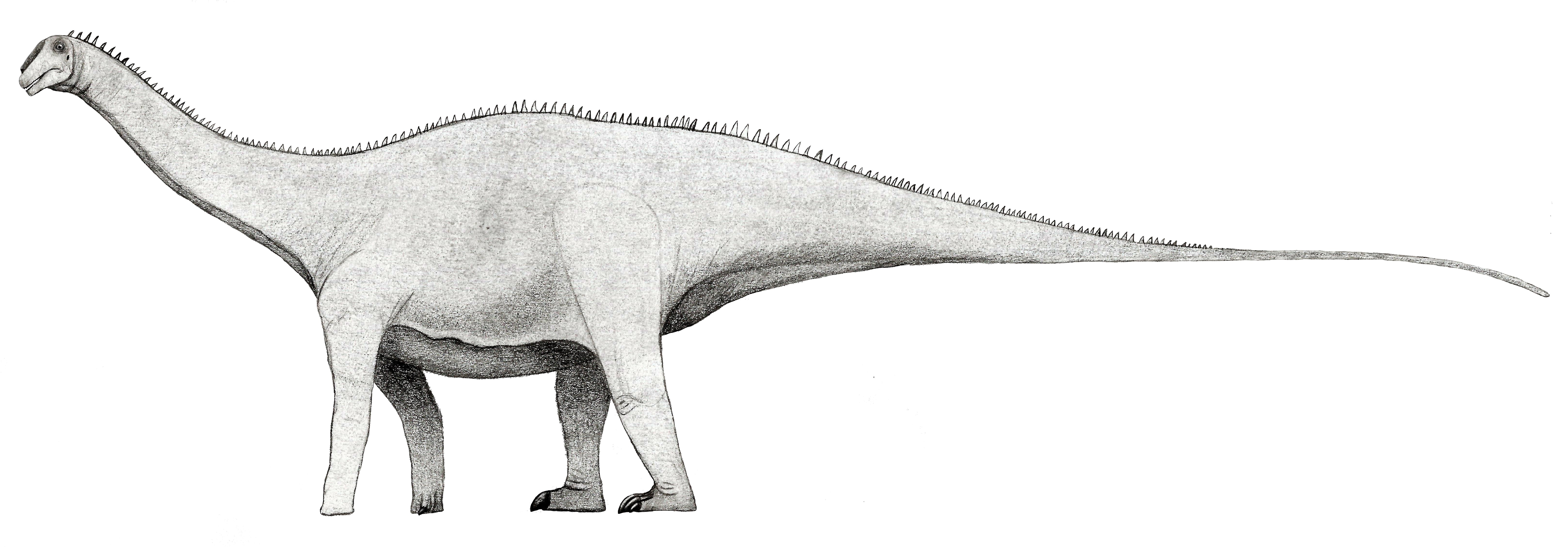
Hypothetically restored as a rebbachisaurid

Xenoposeidon's distinct suite of vertebral characteristics is unlike those found in other groups of sauropods, which differ in various proportional and structural features. So unique is the vertebra that when Taylor and Naish attempted to classify it using a phylogenetic analysis, they found that, although a neosauropod, it didn’t fit ‘comfortably’ into any of the established groups, Diplodocoidea, Camarasauridae, Brachiosauridae and Titanosauria. Xenoposeidon could be a derived member of one of the known groups, or may even represent a new group. The authors left it as a neosauropod of uncertain affinities. The titanosauriform phylogeny by D'Emic established Xenoposeidon as a nomen dubium due to its basis on nondiagnostic material. However, a study published in 2018 by Taylor recovered X. proneneukos as a basal member of Rebbachisauridae, and 10 million years older than the next oldest member of the family, Histriasaurus.

The below majority rules cladogram was found in the analysis of Xenoposeidon. Without the genus, the support for each group except Flagellicaudata was considerably higher.

- Eusauropoda
  - Shunosaurus
  - - Barapasaurus
    - - Patagosaurus
      - - Omeisaurus
        - - Mamenchisaurus
          - Losillasaurus
          - - Haplocanthosaurus
            - Neosauropoda
              - Diplodocoidea
                - - Nigersaurus
                  - Rebbachisaurus
                  - Limaysaurus
                - Flagellicaudata
                  - - Apatosaurus
                    - - Barosaurus
                      - Diplodocus
                  - - Suuwassea
                    - - Amargasaurus
                      - Dicraeosaurus
              - Macronaria
                - Jobaria
                - - Camarasaurus
                  - Titanosauriformes
                    - Brachiosaurus
                    - - Xenoposeidon
                      - - Euhelopus
                        - Titanosauria

== Discovery and history ==
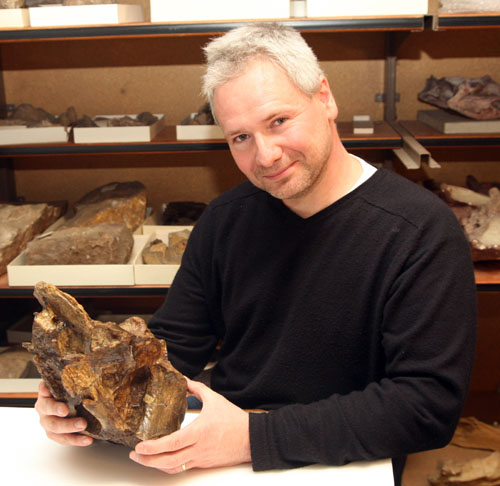
Describer Michael P. Taylor with the vertebra of Xenoposeidon

Fossil collector Philip James Rufford discovered the vertebra that would be later named Xenoposeidon in the early 1890s. It was found near Hastings in East Sussex, England, in rocks of the Hastings Bed Group. This formation dates to the Lower Cretaceous, and is within the Berriasian and Valanginian Stages. The vertebra was probably from the Berriasian portion of the Ashdown Beds within the Hastings, although precise information about the locality and stratigraphy have been lost if such data were ever recorded.

The partial posterior back vertebra, cataloged as BMNH R2095, was briefly described by English naturalist and paleontologist Richard Lydekker in 1893. He thought that it might belong to Cetiosaurus brevis, better known today as Pelorosaurus conybearei. The bone attracted little attention for decades, sitting on a shelf at the British Natural History Museum in London for 113 years. Mike Taylor, a sauropod vertebra specialist, stumbled upon it and became interested in the unusual specimen, eventually describing it along with Darren Naish.

The new genus was first announced by the British Palaeontological Association on November 15, 2007. The genus consists of the single species Xenoposeidon proneneukos. The generic name combines Greek xenos, "strange", with a reference to Poseidon, the "earth-shaker". The specific name means ‘forward sloping’ in Greek, in recognition of the anterior sloping of the neural arch. This unusual characteristic, along with its other distinctive features, prompted the authors to erect the new genus.

== Paleobiology ==
Skeletal reconstruction of Xenoposeidon as a rebbachisaurid

Like other sauropods, Xenoposeidon would have been a large quadrupedal herbivore. It was relatively small for a sauropod. Extrapolating from the vertebra suggests that the type individual of Xenoposeidon could have been about 15 metres (49 feet) long and weighed approximately 7.6 tonnes (8.4 short tons), if it resembled Brachiosaurus, to 20 m (66 ft) long and 2.8 tonnes (3.1 short tons), if it was built like the longer, lighter Diplodocus.
