= C. M. Kösemen =

Turkish artist and author (born 1984)

- Born: Cevdet Mehmet Kösemen; 18 May 1984 (age 42); Ankara, Turkey
- Education: Cornell University; Sabancı University (BA); Goldsmiths' College (MA)
- Known for: All Yesterdays; All Tomorrows; Snaiad; Surrealist paintings Paleo art
- Website: cmkosemen.com

Cevdet Mehmet Kösemen (born 18 May 1984), also known by his former pen name Nemo Ramjet, is a Turkish researcher, artist, and author. Kösemen is known for his artwork, depicting living and extinct animals as well as surrealist scenes, and his writings on paleoart, speculative evolution, and history and culture in Turkey.

Together with Australian paleoartist John Conway and British paleontologist Darren Naish, Kösemen co-authored All Yesterdays, a 2012 book exploring speculative ideas in paleoart, and Cryptozoologicon, a book applying speculative evolution ideas to cryptids, both of which were widely covered in international media. Among Kösemen's most known personal speculative evolution projects are the book All Tomorrows (2006) and the ongoing project Snaiad.

A species of flightless pygmy grasshopper from Costa Rica (Naskreckiana kosemeni) is named in honor of Kösemen.

== Background ==
Cevdet Mehmet Kösemen was born in Ankara, Turkey, in 1984. After attending Koç High School (Istanbul) with obtaining an International Baccalaureate with high honours in 2002, he studied at Cornell University (New York) between 2002 and 2003, and at Sabancı University (Istanbul) between 2003 and 2007, where he obtained a Bachelor of Arts degree in Visual Arts and Communication Design. Kösemen subsequently went to Goldsmiths College (London) in 2007, from which he achieved a Master of Arts degree in Documentary Film and Media Studies in 2008. He has worked as an editor for the magazine Colors by Benetton and in several different advertising agencies.

From a young age, Kösemen was interested in paleontology, extinct animals and evolutionary history, envisioned by him as a way to explore "strange creatures and strange worlds". Kösemen is also interested in visual culture and Mediterranean history. His interests were encouraged by his parents and his grandfather, who on international trips bought him several books on animals. Among Kösemen's favorite literature growing up was the science fiction books of Olaf Stapledon, books on obscure cinema by Pete Tombs, and books part of the former Star Wars Expanded Universe. Kösemen learned English through textbooks on biology and zoology as well as through Star Wars books. Literature Kösemen has also cited as influential for him includes Larry Niven's Ringworld series, Arthur C. Clarke's science fiction works, and Jack L. Chalker's Well World series.

== Career ==
=== Artwork ===
Kösemen's artwork ranges from scientifically accurate depictions of prehistoric life to surrealist paintings. Kösemen's surrealist art combines elements of "imaginary spirits" and "mythological environments". In 2010, Kösemen met Kerimcan Güleryüz, head of an art exhibition project called the Empire Project, which prompted him to further explore symbolism in art. Kösemen remains affiliated with the Empire Project Gallery in Istanbul as an artist.

Since 2010, Kösemen's artwork has been the subject of several exhibitions in Istanbul, such as the exhibition "Sanctuary" which was held at the art space in the quarter Karaköy called Space Debris from January 19 to February 17 of 2018. Kösemen typically completes one large research book and two art exhibits every year. In addition to exhibitions in Turkey, Kösemen's art has also been displayed internationally in Italy, Austria, Montenegro, England and Israel.

=== Writing ===
In 2012, Kösemen co-authored the book All Yesterdays with Australian paleoartist John Conway and British paleontologist Darren Naish. The book, which garnered wide attention and positive reviews, explores speculative ideas in paleoart, art reconstructing prehistoric animals. Conway and Kösemen began working on the book together after they realized that a vast majority of modern dinosaur artwork did not really portray dinosaurs as real animals, ignoring features such as various type of soft tissue (e.g. skin flaps, pouches, fat) that are unlikely to have survived through fossilization. Both All Yesterdays and Conways's, Naish's and Kösemen's later book Cryptozoologicon were widely featured in the media.

In 2011, Kösemen discovered that he is descended from Dönmeh, Jews forced to convert to Islam in the 17th century. He published a book about them, Osman Hasan and the Tombstone Photographs of the Dönmes, in 2014. This book was purchased by several leading research institutes and universities worldwide and won Kösemen the Eduard-Duckesz History Prize in 2016.

Kösemen's 2018 book The Disappearing City, explores and collects photographs of 20th century Turkish street signs and architecture in Istanbul. Describing the book, Kösemen has stated that it came about since Istanbul is rapidly replacing its 20th century buildings and that the city as such is "losing some valuable buildings of a type that are being preserved in, say, Tel Aviv".

Kösemen has garnered attention for his work within the speculative evolution genre. In 2006, he published the book All Tomorrows online as a free PDF file. It depicts humans genetic modification done by extraterrestrials named the Qu, galactic nomads almost a billion years old, travelling to one spiral arm to another in epoch-spanning migrations. During their travels they constantly improved and changed themselves until they became masters of genetic and nanotechnological manipulation. With this ability to control the material world, they assumed a religious, self-imposed mission to 'remake the universe'. This work experienced a surge in online popularity in 2021. Kösemen is also known for his "Snaiad" speculative evolution project, which explores a fictional alien world called Snaiad, with a diverse ecosystem of creatures designed by Kösemen himself. Kösemen hopes to eventually publish Snaiad as a book.

In July 2024 Kösemen announced a crowdfunding campaign to publish All Tomorrows in English as a physical book for the first time. The crowdfunding goal was met within 24hrs.

== Tangent Realms ==
A documentary about C. M. Kösemen and his work, titled Tangent Realms: The Worlds of C. M. Kösemen and directed by indie filmmaker Kevin Schreck, was released in 2018. The film explores not only Kösemen's art, but also his personal life and questions he and other people face at some point in their lives. The film received awards at several indie film festivals.

== Bibliography ==
=== Speculative biology and paleontology ===
- 2006 All Tomorrows: A Billion Year Chronicle of the Myriad Species and Mixed Fortunes of Man
- 2012 All Yesterdays: Unique and Speculative Views of Dinosaurs and Other Prehistoric Animals, with John Conway and Darren Naish
- 2013 All Your Yesterdays: Extraordinary Visions of Extinct Life by a New Generation of Palaeoartists (free e-book)
- 2013 Cryptozoologicon: The Biology, Evolution, and Mythology of Hidden Animals, with John Conway and Darren Naish

=== Culture and history in Turkey ===
- 2013 Nişanyan House, a Photographic Essay
- 2014 Osman Hasan and the Tombstone Photographs of the Dönmes
- 2018 The Bodrum Jewish Cemetery
- 2018 The Disappearing City: Hand-Painted Apartment Signs and Architectural Details from 20th-Century Istanbul
- 2018 A Karakaş Speaks: Interviews with a Member of Turkey’s Crypto-Judaic “Dönme” Sect
- 2019 Memories and Stories of Bodrum's Jewish Community
- 2019 Hatıratlarda Türkiye Yahudileri, with Rıfat N. Bali
- 2020 Memoirs of an Istanbul Psychiatrist, translated and edited memoirs of Turkish neuropsychiatrist Henri Griladze
- 2021 Forests of the Afterlife: Folk Art and Symbolism in Village Cemeteries of Turkey's Bodrum-Milas Peninsula

=== Art collections ===
- 2016 Tangent Worlds: From the Sketchbooks of C. M. Kosemen (free e-book)
- 2019 Alternate Life: From the Online Sketchbooks of C. M. Kosemen (free e-book)
- 2020 Decade: Surreal Artworks by C. M. Kosemen (free e-book)
