= All Yesterdays =

Book by Darren Naish, C.M. Kosemen and John Conway

- Cover, depicting three Protoceratops in a tree.
- Author: John Conway, C. M. Kosemen, and Darren Naish
- Language: English
- Subject: Palaeoart
- Publisher: Irregular Books
- Publication date: 2012
- Publication place: United Kingdom
- Media type: Print, digital
- Pages: 100 pp.
- ISBN: 978-1291177121

All Yesterdays: Unique and Speculative Views of Dinosaurs and Other Prehistoric Animals is a 2012 art book on the palaeoartistic reconstruction of dinosaurs and other extinct animals by John Conway, C. M. Kosemen and Darren Naish. A central tenet of the book concerns the fact that many dinosaur reconstructions are outdated, overly conservative, and inconsistent with the variation observed in modern animals. This focus is communicated through an exploration of views of dinosaurs and related animals that are unusual and sometimes even confusing to viewers, but which are well within the bounds of behaviour, anatomy and soft tissue seen in living animals.

== Overview ==
The book first recounts the history of changing perceptions of dinosaurs as expressed in artwork. It begins with the sluggish and slow dinosaurs seen in the works of Charles R. Knight, and then continues into analyzing reconstructions after the dinosaur renaissance. It points out that these reconstructions do not take the often bizarre integumentary coverings of living animals into account, and that dinosaurs should be portrayed as natural animals that are not 'shrink-wrapped' with many of the individual bones visible.

The remainder of the book consists of pictures with accompanying explanatory texts. Each picture displays a hypothetical adaptation that an extinct animal could have possessed, such as a plesiosaur disguised on the seafloor like a wobbegong or something that dinosaurs are not usually shown doing, such as a sleeping Tyrannosaurus. The texts describe the adaptations or habits and explain why they are plausible. Some of the entries are deliberately made to break a paleoartistic cliché, such as a Tenontosaurus walking alone without a predatory Deinonychus in sight (Tenontosaurus is almost exclusively depicted in dinosaur art as the prey of Deinonychus).

The second and last major section of the book is titled "All Todays", and depicts animals from the present day as if non-human paleontologists from the future were reconstructing them from fossilized skeletons. Some of the creatures are somewhat recognizable, like a vulture depicted with pterosaur-like wings; others are completely unrecognizable, like a rhinoceros reconstructed with no nose horn and a sail instead of a hump. By showing how completely extant animals might be misunderstood if known only from skeletal remains, All Yesterdays shows that our own conceptions of extinct animals are likely equally mistaken.

Images used in All Yesterdays

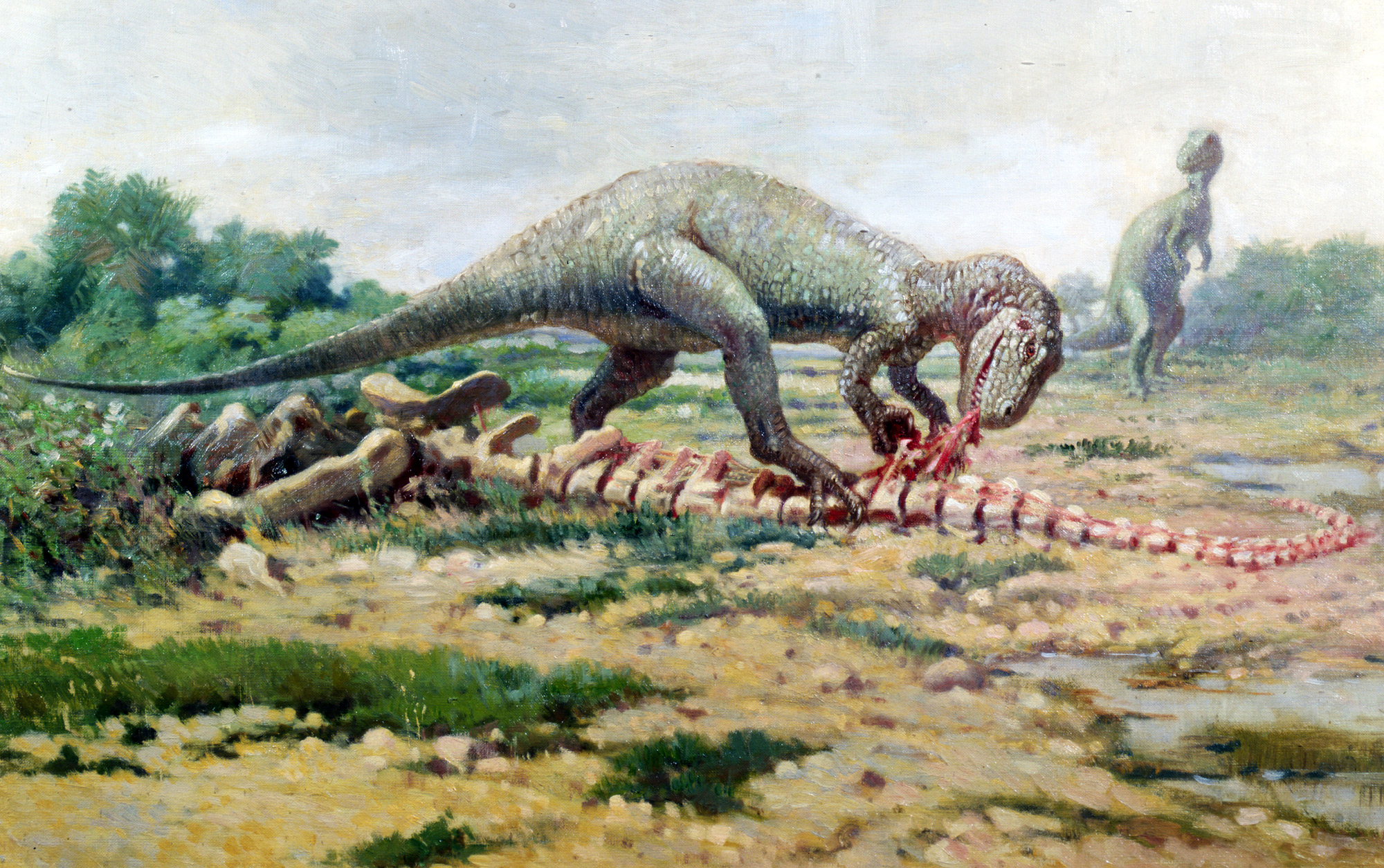
Allosaurus by Charles Knight. The book asks the reader to note the slender, lizard-like thighs and muscles which did not match their bones

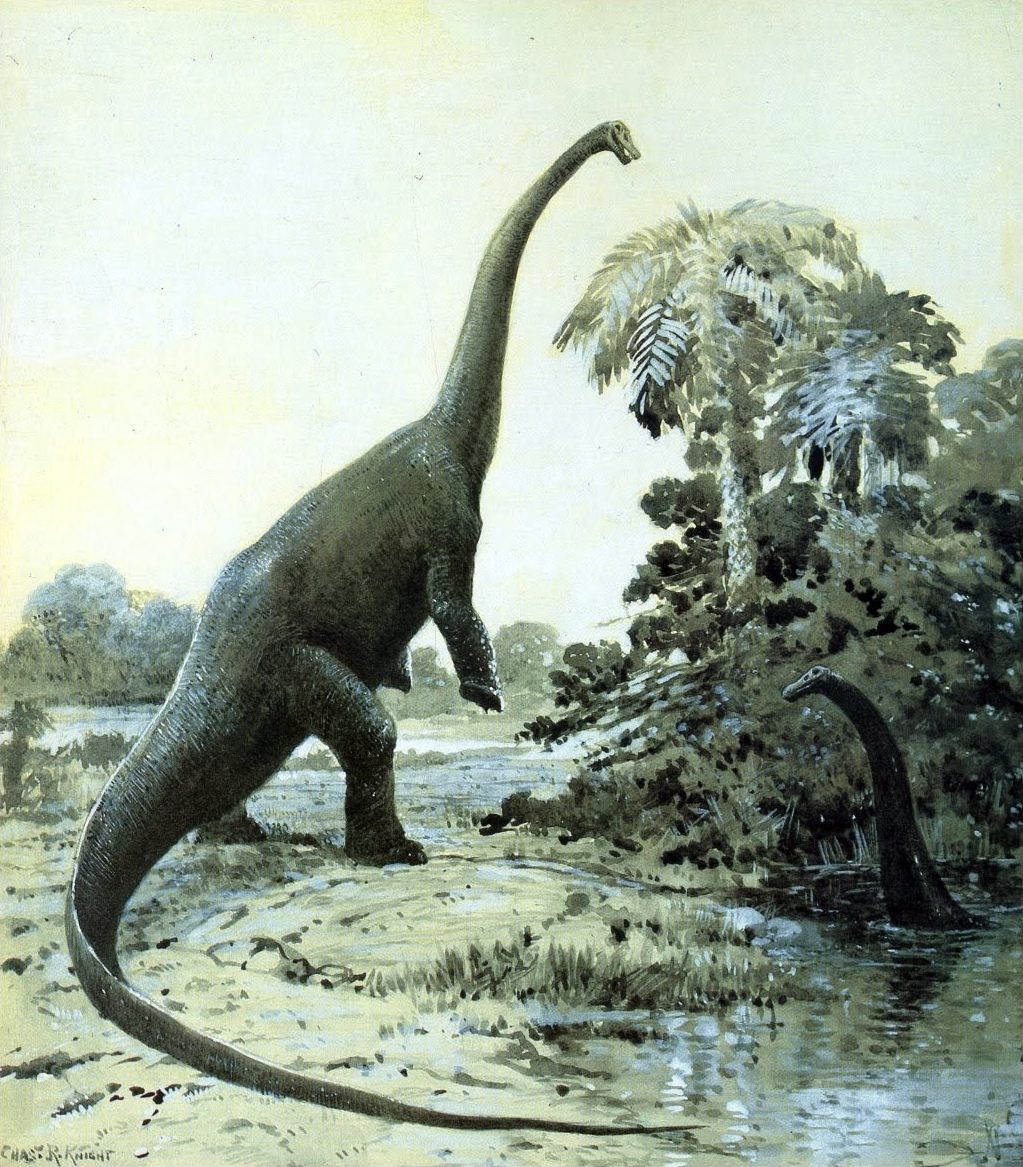
Diplodocus by Charles Knight. The book asks the reader to note the slender, lizard-like thighs and muscles which did not match their bones

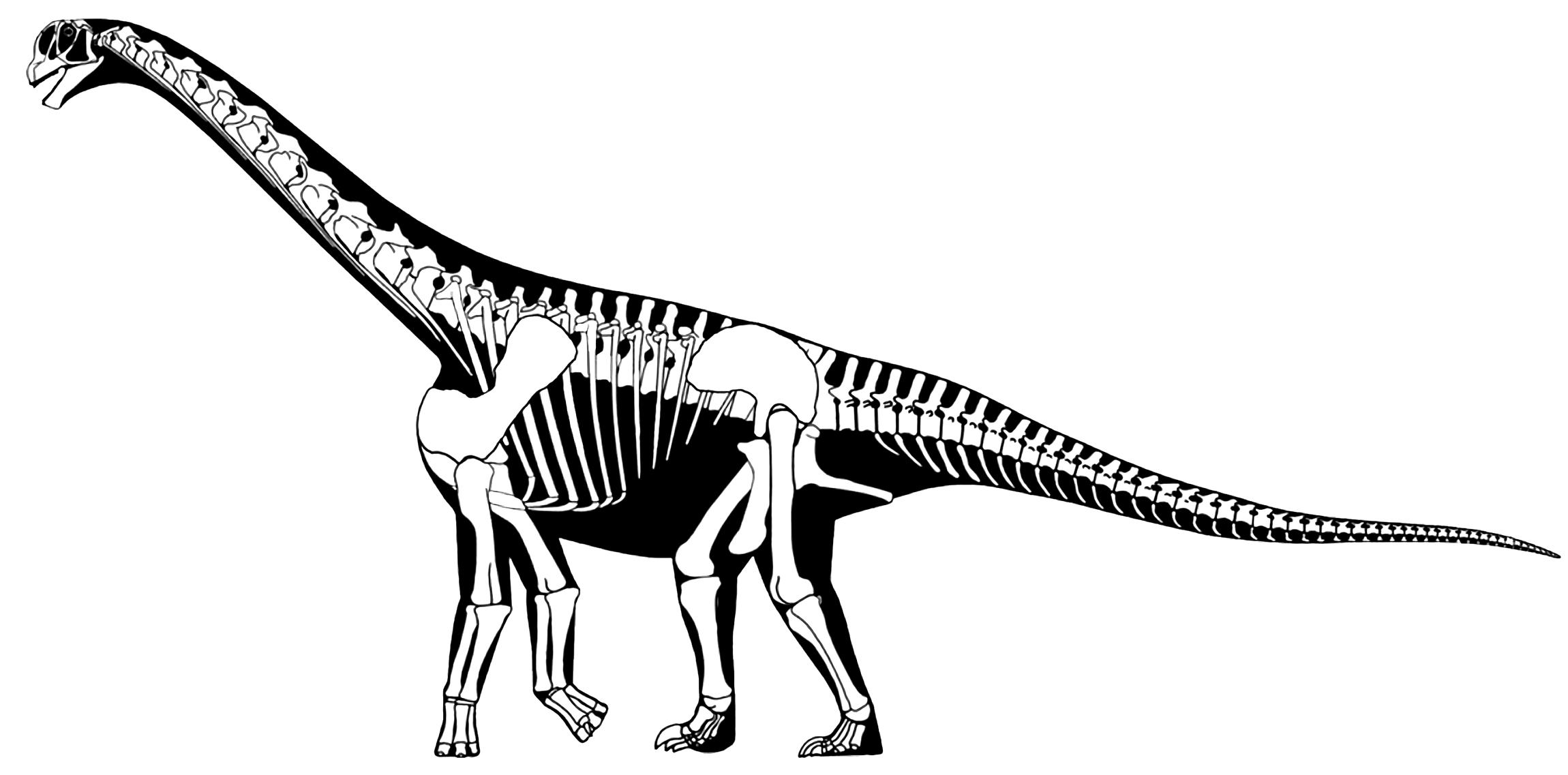
Camarasaurus Skeletal by Scott Hartman

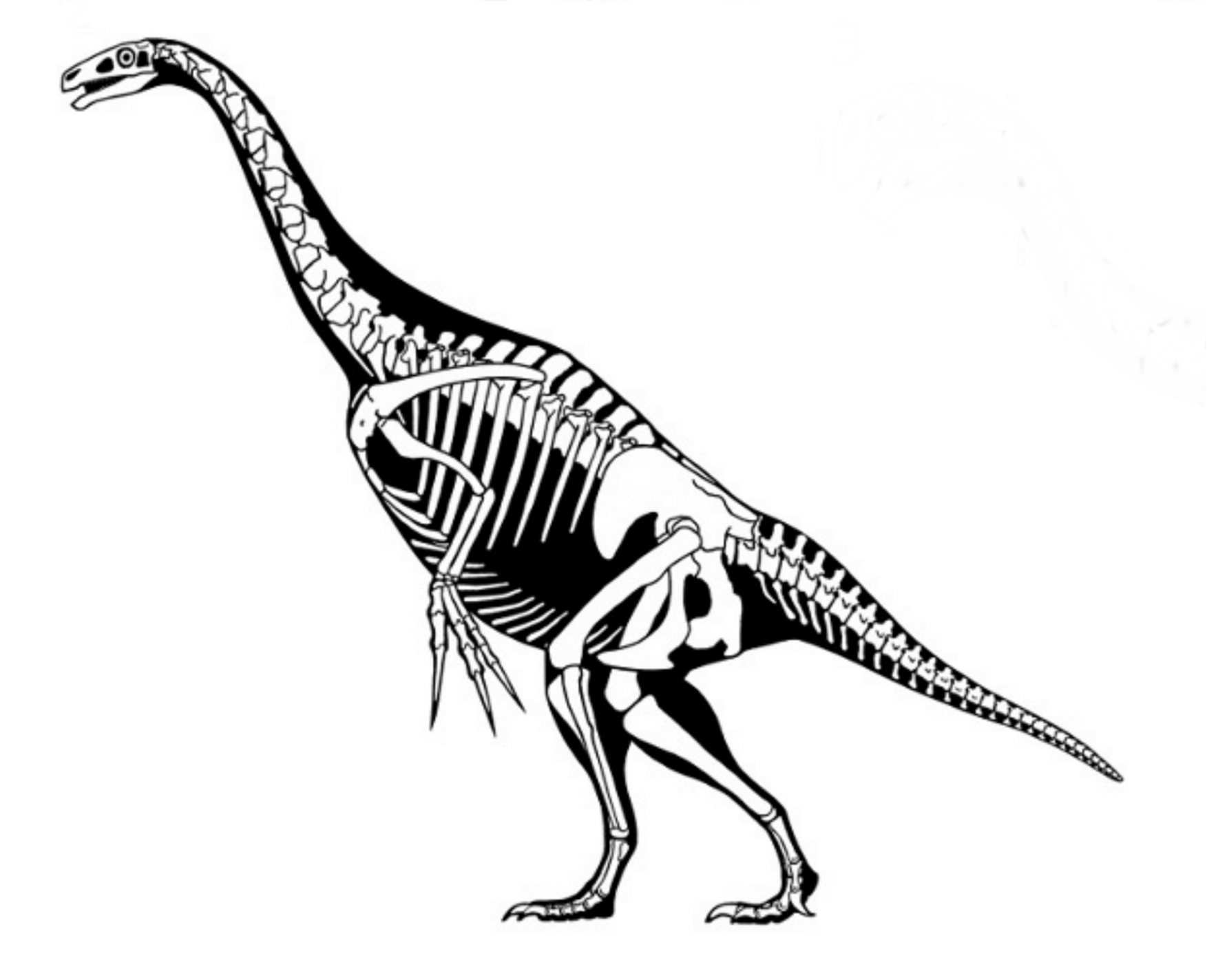
Nothronychus mckinleyi Skeletal by Scott Hartman

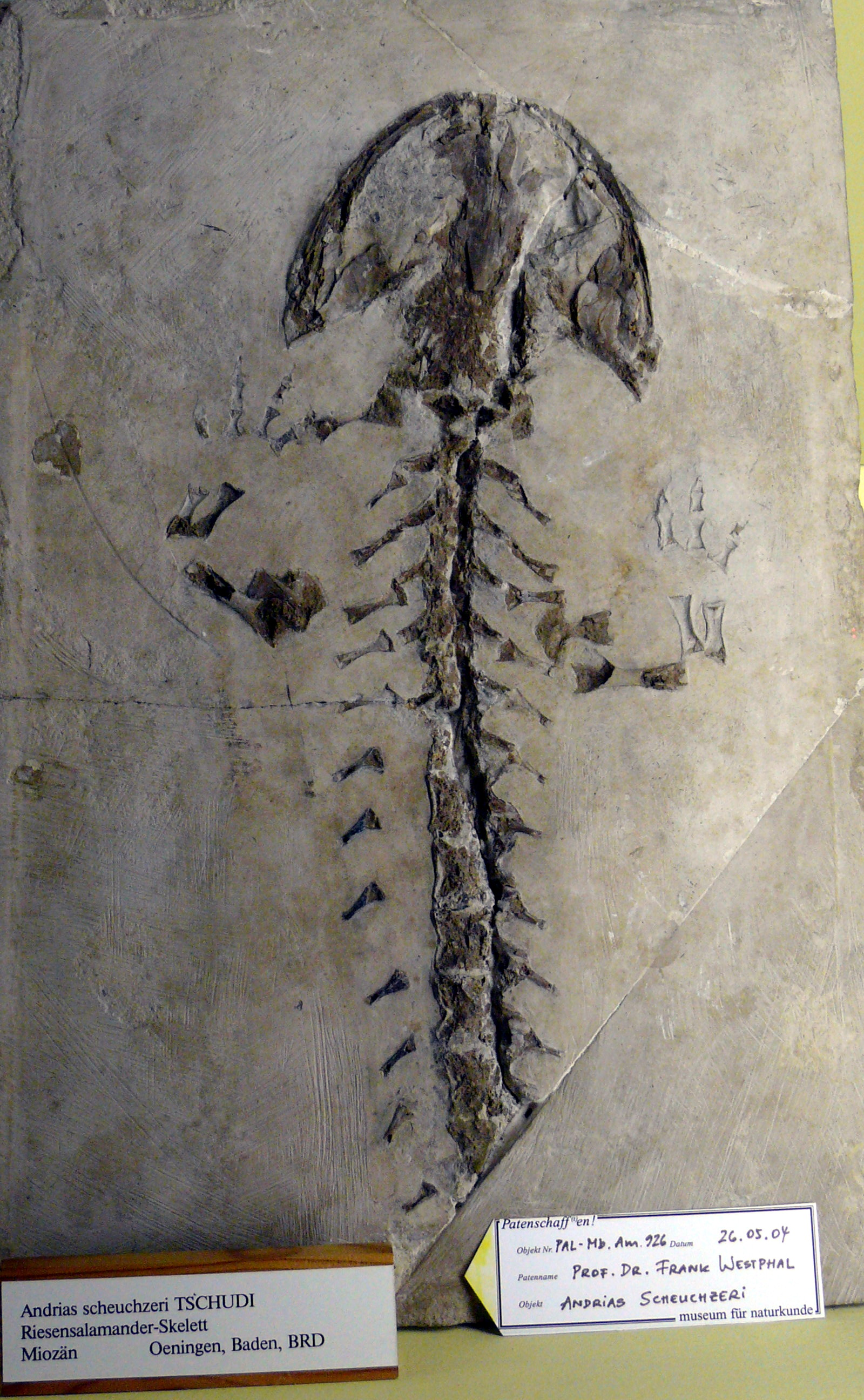
Andrias scheuchzeri skeleton photograph by "Haplochromis"

== Reception ==
Subsequent to its publication, All Yesterdays has proven influential on the modern culture of palaeoart. The book and its associated concepts have sometimes appeared in publications covering the nature, history, and 'best practices' of palaeoart, particularly in the context of emphasizing the need for modern depictions of dinosaurs to be consistent with how living animals look and behave. This 'post modern' approach to palaeoart is thought to be seminal in the modern culture of identifying and subverting overused palaeoart memes and tropes, and may be an accurate reflection of the "contemporary mood of palaeoartists more than any other project."

All Yesterdays has received mostly very enthusiastic reviews from palaeontologists, and is perceived as introducing or popularising a new "third wave" approach to palaeoart after the classical period of Knight, Zallinger, Burian and others, and the more modern work of Bakker, Paul, Henderson and others. For example, John Hutchinson of the Royal Veterinary College wrote "This is a thinking person’s book … for rumination, to challenge your preconceptions, not to have a flashy coffee table book. It’s not eye candy — it’s more like brain jerky." And Mike Taylor wrote "All Yesterdays is not only the most beautiful but also the most important palaeoart book of the last four decades". Writing for The Guardian, palaeontologist David Hone notes that "… the key point is that they are in many ways no more extreme or unlikely than what we see in living species of birds, mammals and reptiles, and no less plausible than many more 'traditional' views of dinosaurs."

== 2013 sequel ==
In 2013, an All Your Yesterdays "crowdsourced" sequel was released, also focusing on speculative aspects of paleoart, which invited "fan works" in the style of All Yesterdays, by various invited hobbyist to professional artists, including established paleoartists.

A creature dubbed "Bearded Ceticaris", conceived by artist John Meszaros as a filter-feeding radiodont, was published in All Your Yesterdays as a speculative art concept. In 2014, during a taxonomic study, the actual Cambrian radiodont Tamisiocaris was discovered to have been a filter-feeder. In honor of Meszaros's prediction, Tamisiocaris was included in a new clade named the Cetiocaridae. Cetiocaridae was renamed Tamisiocarididae in 2019.

== See also ==
- Speculative evolution
- All Tomorrows
