= Michael P. Taylor =

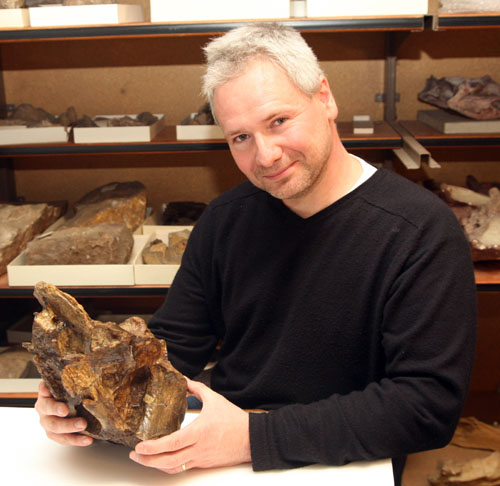
- Born: 12 March 1968 (age 58); Bishop's Stortford, England
- Education: Warwick University; University of Portsmouth
- Scientific career
- Fields: Paleontology; Computer programming

Michael Paul Taylor (born 12 March 1968) is a British computer programmer with a Ph.D. in palaeontology. To date, he has published 31 paleontological papers and is co-credited with naming three genera of dinosaur (Xenoposeidon in 2007 with Darren Naish, Brontomerus in 2011 with Matt J. Wedel and Richard Cifeli, and Haestasaurus in 2015 with Paul Upchurch and Phil Mannion).

Along with paleontologists Darren Naish and Matt Wedel, he founded the paleontology blog Sauropod Vertebra Picture of the Week, where he blogs as Mike Taylor.

He lives in Ruardean, Gloucestershire, England.
