= John Conway (astronomer) =

British astronomer

John E. Conway (born 1963) is a British astronomer. He is director of Onsala Space Observatory in Sweden. He was appointed professor of observational radio astronomy at Chalmers University of Technology, Sweden, in 2010.

His research concerns radio galaxies and radio telescope technology, particularly involving VLBI. His design for a spiral configuration of antennas was adopted for the telescope ALMA.

Conway was one of the scientists portrayed in the 1991 TV series The Astronomers.
