= George Conway (disambiguation) =

George Conway may refer to:

- George Thomas Conway III (born 1963), American lawyer
- George C. Conway (1900–1969), American politician
- George H. Conway (1878–1939), American horse trainer
- George Robert Graham Conway (1873–1951), Mexican civil engineer and historian
