= Martin Conway =

Martin Conway may refer to:

- Martin Conway, 1st Baron Conway of Allington (1856–1937), English art critic, politician and mountaineer
- Martin Conway (historian) (born 1960), British historian
- Martin Conway (Irish politician) (born 1974), Irish Fine Gael Senator
- Martin A. Conway (1952–2022), British psychologist
- Martin F. Conway (1827–1882), U.S. politician
