= James Conway (musician) =

James Conway is an Irish-American musician based in Chicago, Illinois, and is particularly known for playing traditional Irish music on the harmonica and tin whistle. He also plays guitar, bodhran, and plays folk and country blues music. Jason Ricci said of Conway's playing, "This guy is the king of tongue switching (playing out of both sides of your mouth) – his octave leaps, effortless complex melodies, and chords are mind melting to the harmonica player while natural to the listener."

Conway began playing tin whistle and guitar as a child, studied classical music at Columbia College, and learned harmonica from Junior Wells, Sugar Blue, and Howard Levy.

In 2003, Conway was the recipient of a "master artist" grant from the Illinois Arts Council to teach Irish tin whistle as part of the Ethnic & Folk Arts Master/Apprentice Program. The Hohner company has also recognized Conway's expertise; he is a Hohner harmonica endorser.

== Discography ==
- Mouth Box (2002)
- James Conway Live at the American Legion (2009)
