= Arthur Conway =

Arthur Conway may refer to:

- Arthur Conway (sportsman) (1885–1954), English cricketer and footballer
- Arthur W. Conway (1875–1949), Irish academic
