= Jack Conway =

Jack Conway may refer to:

- Jack Conway (baseball) (1918–1993), American baseball player
- Jack Conway (filmmaker) (1886–1952), American film producer and director
- Jack Conway (footballer) (1867–1949), Australian rules footballer
- Jack Conway (politician) (born 1969), former Attorney General of Kentucky
- Jack T. Conway (1918–1998), American labor unionist
- John White Conway (1888–1928) (1888–1928), reviewer for Variety

== See also ==
- John Conway (disambiguation)
