= David Conway =

David Conway may refer to:

- David Conway (author) (born 1963), Irish author and musician
- David Conway (music historian) (born 1950), British music historian
- David Conway (philosopher) (born 1947), British academic philosopher
