= Hugh E. Conway =

British scientist

Hugh Conway
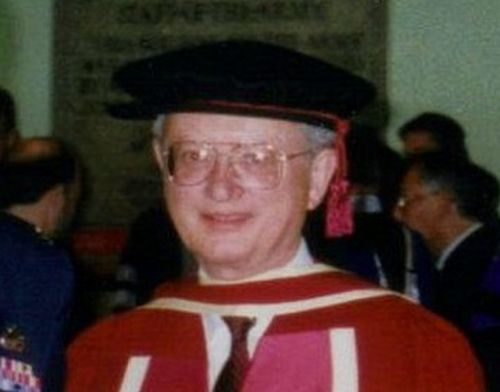
- Conway at Industrial College of the Armed Forces graduation in 1995
- Born: October 9, 1942 (age 83); New York City, U.S.
- Citizenship: United States
- Education: Cornell University (B.S.); London School of Economics (M.Sc. Econ); University of London (Ph.D.)
- Occupations: Economist and college professor
- Writing career
- Notable work: Defense Economic Issues
- Notable awards: Bronze Star Medal (military) and Joint Civilian Service Commendation Award (civilian)

Hugh Edward Conway (born 1942) is a college professor and expert on labor economics and the construction industry in the United States. He held the Department of Labor Chair and taught economics at the Industrial College of the Armed Forces. He traveled extensively with military and academic groups studying construction projects across the United States and around the world. Conway wrote numerous articles on a wide range of labor and economics-related subjects. He also compiled and edited several books.

== Early life ==
Hugh Conway was born in New York City, New York on 9 October 1942. Conway attended Cornell University, receiving a Bachelor of Science degree in industrial and labor relations in 1964. He then went on to attend graduate school at the London School of Economics, where he earned a Master of Science in economics degree in 1965. The next step for Conway was doctoral level education at University of London. He did his doctoral work at the university's School of Oriental and African Studies. In 1968, the University of London awarded him a doctor of philosophy degree in economics and labor relations. An article based on his thesis was published in an Australian academic journal.

Conway served in the United States Army between 1968 and 1972. He received a Bronze Star Medal and several campaign medals for his service during the Vietnam War.

== Labor economist ==
Conway was a career employee of the United States Department of Labor. He began his service as an economist in the department's Pay Board in Washington, District of Columbia. In 1973, he was selected to serve as an executive assistant in the office of the Secretary of Labor. In 1975, he was appointed head of a research division in the labor department's Employment Standards Administration. In 1978, Conway became assistant director of the construction industry office in the Labor Management Services Administration, another Department of Labor agency.

In 1984, Conway was promoted to director of the office of regulatory analysis in the Occupational Safety and Health Administration. In that position, he was responsible for preparing economic studies, cost-benefit analysis, and cost effectiveness reports for the Department of Labor. This work supported a wide range of occupational health and safety regulations developed by Federal government.

While working for the Department of Labor, Conway wrote articles for academic journals and edited several books. In 1986, he co-authored an article on Kuwait's economic environment. In 1990, his book entitled Defense Economic Issues was published by the National Defense University Press. That same year, he co-edited Global Corporate Intelligence, Opportunities, Technologies, and Threats 1990's, which was published by Greenwood-Quoram Books. His article entitled "Medical Surveillance in United States Industry" was published in the Journal of Occupational Medicine in July 1993.

== Industrial College of the Armed Forces ==
In the spring of 1994, Conway joined the Industrial College of the Armed Forces faculty as a professor of economics and the college's Department of Labor Chair. In 1999, Conway accepted a permanent appointment as a professor of economics at the college. He taught core courses in both macro-economic and micro-economics plus several economics-related elective courses including "Economics and Information Technology". He also led the faculty team that taught the college's construction industry studies seminar. This program included extensive travel across the United States and a two-week oversees study tour each year. During these trips, Conway met with senior government officials, construction industry executives, and local labor leaders.

In 1997, Conway wrote the section on World War II infrastructure construction projects for The Big L- American Logistics in World War II. The book was published by National Defense University Press. He published academic articles in Monthly Labor Review and the Journal of Labor Research. Conway also edited the construction industry section for the In Touch with Industry report, published annually by the Industrial College of the Armed Forces.

Conway retired from his teaching post at the Industrial College of the Armed Forces in 2005. Upon his retirement, he received the Joint Civilian Service Commendation Award from the United States Department of Defense. Today, he lives in Alexandria, Virginia.
