= Kevin Conway =

Kevin Conway may refer to:

- Kevin Conway (actor) (1942–2020), American actor and film director
- Kevin Conway (ice hockey) (born 1963), Canadian ice hockey player
- Kevin Conway (racing driver) (born 1979), Sprint Cup and Nationwide Series driver
