= William Conway =

William, Bill, or Billy Conway may refer to:

- William Conway (Arkansas judge) (1805–1852), Justice of the Arkansas Supreme Court
- William Conway (cardinal) (1913–1977), Irish cardinal of the Roman Catholic Church
- William Conway (Irish republican) (1902–1979), one of three Irish Republicans convicted of murder for events of the 1920 Bloody Sunday
- William Conway (United States Navy) (1802–1865), American sailor
- William A. Conway (actor) (1789–1828), English-born American actor
- William A. Conway (banker) (1910–2006), American banker
- William B. Conway (1802–1839), American lawyer and Secretary of Iowa Territory
- William C. Conway (1865–1969), American leader of a mystical Latter Day Saint sect
- William E. Conway Jr. (born 1949), American founder of the Carlyle Group, former CFO of MCI Communications
- William G. Conway (1929–2021), American zoologist
- Martin Conway, 1st Baron Conway of Allington (William Martin Conway, 1856–1937), English mountaineer, cartographer, art critic and politician
- Bill Conway (baseball) (William F. Conway, 1861–1943), American Major League Baseball player
- Bill Conway, American singer with The Modernaires
- Bill Conway (politician), member-elect of the Chicago City Council
- Billy Conway (rugby league) (born 1967), English rugby league footballer
- Billy Conway (drummer), member of Treat Her Right and Morphine
- Billy Conway, a character in Accidents Happen
