= Darren Naish =

British palaeontologist and writer

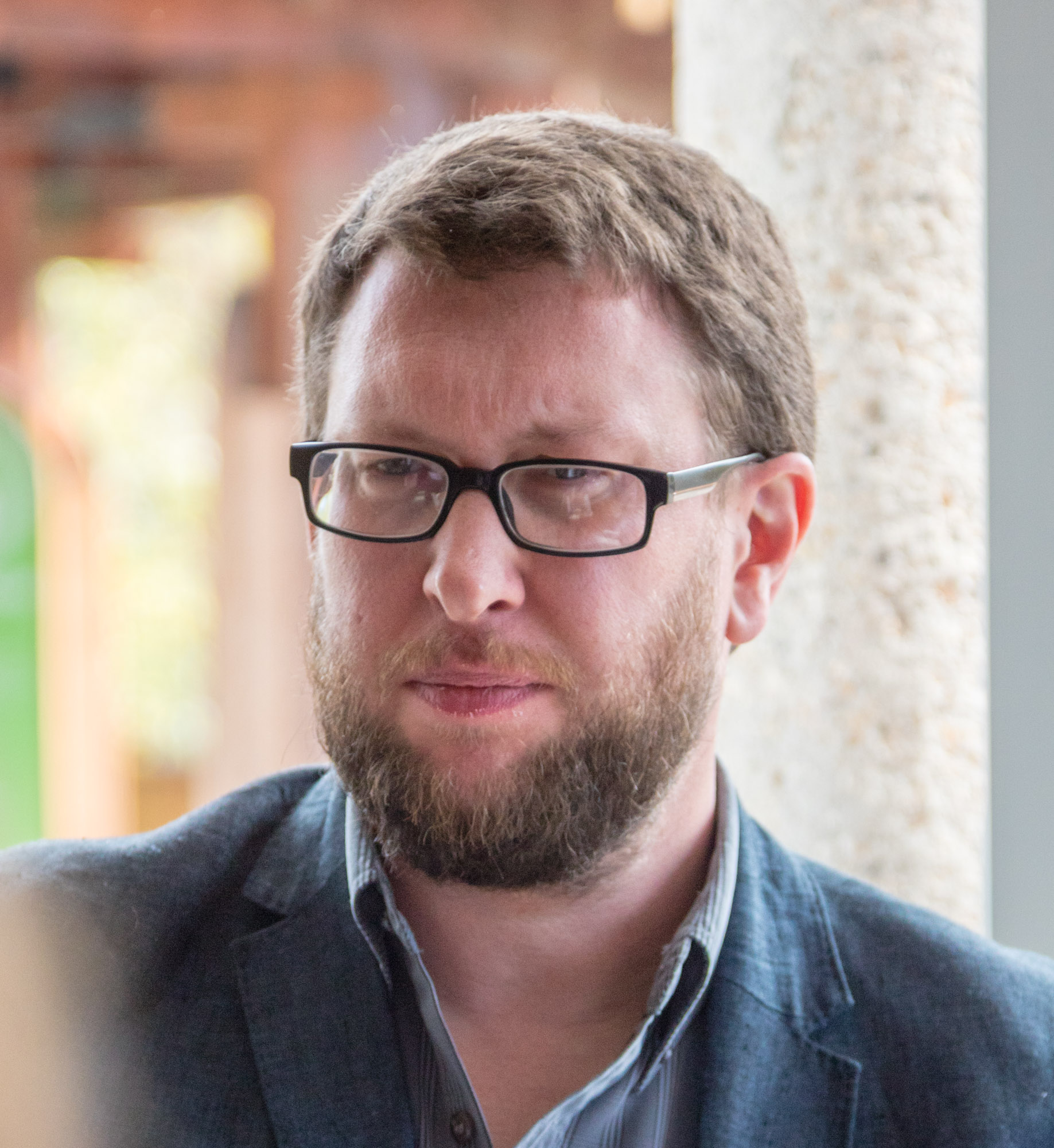
- Darren Naish in 2016
- Born: Darren William Naish; 26 September 1976 (age 49); England
- Education: University of Southampton University of Portsmouth
- Known for: "Tetrapod Zoology", Azhdarchid behaviour, and Xenoposeidon
- Scientific career
- Fields: Palaeontology, Zoology

Darren Naish (born 26 September 1976) is a British vertebrate palaeontologist, author and science communicator.

As a researcher, he is best known for his work describing and reevaluating dinosaurs and other Mesozoic reptiles, including dinosaurs, such as Eotyrannus and Xenoposeidon; flying reptiles, such as Vectidraco and Eurazhdarcho;; and ichthyosaurs, such as Malawania and Acamptonectes. A significant amount of his research has focussed on fossils from the exposures of the Lower Cretaceous Wessex Formation of the Wealden Group along the south-west coast of the Isle of Wight, which has noted containing rich, diverse and well-documented dinosaur fauna.

Naish founded the vertebrate palaeozoology blog Tetrapod Zoology, and has written several popular science books. Naish also makes frequent media appearances and is a scientific consultant and advisor for film, television, museums and exhibitions. Naish is also known for scepticism in work examining cryptozoology topics, including sea monster sightings.

== Early life and education ==
Born Darren William Naish in England on 26 September 1976, Naish obtained an undergraduate geology degree at the University of Southampton. He went on to study vertebrate palaeontology under David Martill at the University of Portsmouth, where he obtained both an M. Phil., and then a Ph.D. in 2006.

Naish began his palaeontology research intending to work on fossilised marine reptiles, but became known as a result of his graduate work, especially on the basal tyrannosauroid theropod Eotyrannus, a dinosaur that, in 2001, with his Southampton thesis advisor David Martill, and Steve Hutt of the Museum of Isle of Wight Geology, he and other colleagues shared publication authorship wherein the theropod was first named.

== Career ==
=== Positions and affiliations ===
As of 2009, Naish was being reported to hold the position of "Honorary Research Associate in the School of Earth and Environmental Sciences at the University of Portsmouth".

=== Research ===
Naish has published articles on the Wealden Supergroup theropods Thecocoelurus, Calamospondylus and Aristosuchus. With Martill and "Dino" Frey, he named a new, illegally acquired Brazilian compsognathid theropod Mirischia. In 2004, Naish and Gareth Dyke reinterpreted the controversial Romanian fossil Heptasteornis. Suggested by other authors to be a giant owl, troodontid or dromaeosaurid, it was argued by Naish and Dyke to be an alvarezsaurid, and as such is the first member of this group to be reported from Europe. Other fragmentary European alvarezsaurid specimens have since been reported.

Naish has also published work on sauropod dinosaurs, pterosaurs, fossil marine reptiles, turtles, marine mammals and other fossil vertebrates, and he has also produced articles on other aspects of zoology. He published a series of articles on poorly known cetaceans during the 1990s and in 2004 published a review article on the giant New Zealand gecko Hoplodactylus delcourti.

In 2004 Naish and colleagues described a giant Isle of Wight sauropod dinosaur that appears closely related to the North American brachiosaurid Sauroposeidon, and informally referred to as Angloposeidon. Prior to the 2006 description of Turiasaurus from Spain, this was the largest dinosaur reported from Europe. In 2005 he coauthored the description of the new Cretaceous turtle Araripemys arturi, and in 2006 he and David Martill published a revision of the South American crested pterosaurs Tupuxuara and Thalassodromeus. During 2007 and 2008, Naish and Martill published a major revision of British dinosaurs; Naish also published work with Barbara Sánchez-Hernández and Michael J. Benton on the vertebrate fossils of Galve in Spain; the Galve fossils are significant in including istiodactylid pterosaurs, heterodontosaurids and spinosaurines. In 2007, Naish co-authored the description of the new sauropod Xenoposeidon with fellow Portsmouth-based palaeontologist Mike P. Taylor. In 2008 he published an evaluation of azhdarchid pterosaurs with Mark Witton, in which they argued that azhdarchids were stork- or ground hornbill-like generalists, foraging in diverse environments for small animals and carrion. Along with his colleagues Mike Taylor and Matt Wedel he published a paper on sauropod neck posture in 2008. In 2010 Naish published a paper on the theoretical flotation abilities of giraffes. In 2011, Hone, Naish and Cuthill published a paper on mutual selection in dinosaurs and pterosaurs. In 2013, Naish wrote research papers describing Vectidraco daisymorrisae, a small azhdarchoid pterosaur from the Isle of Wight,, a follow-up to their 2008 paper on terrestrial stalking in azhdarchid pterosaurs,, and a paper presenting fossil evidence for 'sexual selection'. In 2015, Naish and colleagues published on a new, as-yet-unnamed, Transylvanian pterosaur taxon.

In 2017, a new species of pycnodont fish, Scalacurvichthys naishi, was named after Naish.

Below is a list of taxa that Naish has contributed to naming:

Year	Taxon	Authors
2021	Ceratosuchops inferodios gen. et sp. nov.	Barker, Hone, Naish, Cau, Lockwood, Foster, Clarkin, Schneider, & Gostling
2021	Riparovenator milnerae gen. et sp. nov.	Barker, Hone, Naish, Cau, Lockwood, Foster, Clarkin, Schneider, & Gostling
2020	Vectaerovenator inopinatus gen. et sp. nov.	Barker, Naish, Clarkin, Farrell, Hullman, Lockyer, Schneider, Ward, & Gostling
2013	Malawania anachronus gen. et sp. nov.	Fischer, Appleby, Naish, Liston, Riding, Brindley, & Godefroit
2013	Vectidraco daisymorrisae gen. et sp. nov.	Naish, Simpson, & Dyke
2012	Acamptonectes densus gen. et sp. nov.	Fischer, Maisch, Naish, Kosma, Liston, Joger, Krüger, Pérez, Tainsh, & Appleby
2011	Samrukia nessovi gen. et sp. nov.	Naish, Dyke, Cau, Escuillié, & Godefroit
2007	Xenoposeidon proneneukos gen. et sp. nov.	Taylor & Naish
2004	Mirischia asymmetrica gen. et sp. nov.	Naish, Martill, & Frey

=== Writing ===
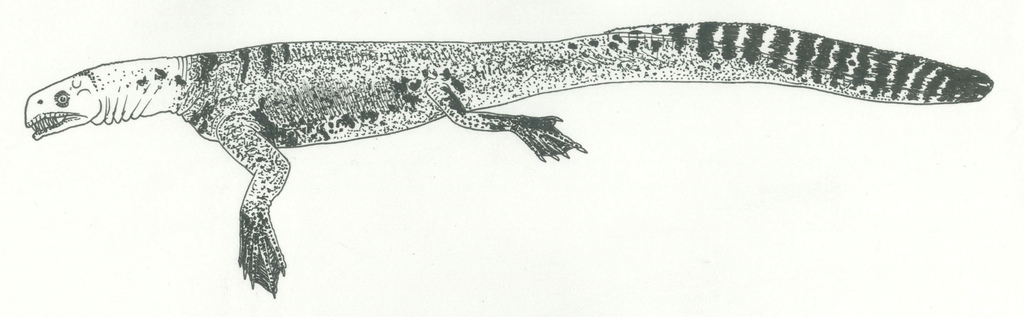
Illustration of the prehistoric marine reptile Helveticosaurus by Naish

Naish has published several popular books on prehistoric animals including Dinosaurs: How They Lived and Evolved co-authored with Paul Barrett (Natural History Museum 2016) Dinosaur Record Breakers (Carlton Kids 2018), the Dorling Kindersley Encyclopedia of Dinosaurs and Prehistoric Life (2003, with David Lambert and Elizabeth Wyse), the Palaeontological Association book Dinosaurs of the Isle of Wight (2001, with David Martill) and the BBC Walking with Dinosaurs: The Evidence (2000, with David Martill), produced to accompany the TV series Walking with Dinosaurs. In 2010, he published The Great Dinosaur Discoveries as sole author.

In 2012, he published All Yesterdays with John Conway and C. M. Kosemen. It examines the palaeontological reconstruction of dinosaurs by applying the same method to living animal skeletons.

In 2017 Naish published Evolution in Minutes a book answering fundamental questions on the topic of evolution through a collection of mini-essays.

In 2021, he published Dinopedia, a book covering a variety of topics ranging from general concepts of dinosaur anatomy, groups of dinosaurs, significant people, and locations.

Naish has also published several books on cryptozoology, including Hunting Monsters: Cryptozoology and the Reality Behind the Myths and Cryptozoologicon: Volume I with John Conway and C. M. Kosemen.

Naish's name is attached to several children's books on prehistoric animals.

=== Editorial positions ===
Naish has been an associate editor for the journal Cretaceous Research.

=== Media ===
Naish has appeared widely on British television, having featured on BBC News 24, Channel 4's Sunday Brunch, Richard & Judy, and Live from Dinosaur Island, as well as the documentary How to build a dinosaur. He appeared on a Channel 4 discussion programme on cryptozoology, presented by journalist Jon Ronson, during the late 1990s. Naish received media coverage for his research on the giant Isle of Wight sauropod "Angloposeidon", the pterosaur Tupuxuara, the sauropod Xenoposeidon, and the flotation abilities of giraffes.

Naish was a scientific advisor for Impossible Pictures, the 2020 Netflix series Alien Worlds, and the Apple TV+ series Prehistoric Planet.

Naish has been featured in several stories about so-called mystery carcasses including the Montauk Monster, San Diego Demonoid, Beast of Exmoor, and a Russian mystery monster carcass. He emphasises the effects of taphonomy in making familiar animals unrecognisable.

Among the popular books by Naish that were widely featured in the media were the Cryptozoologicon and All Yesterdays.

In September 2022, Naish spoke at the United Nations Science Summit 2022.

== Blogs and podcasts ==
=== Tetrapod Zoology ===
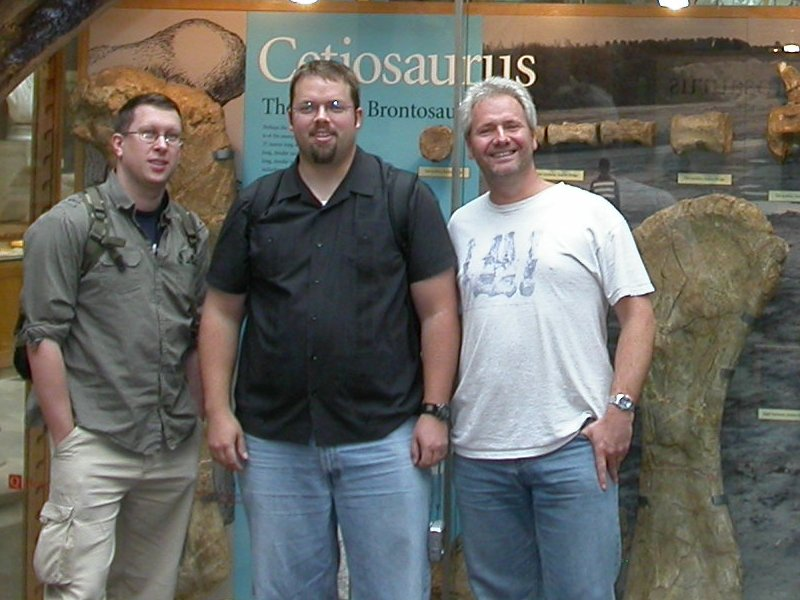
Naish with Matt Wedel and Mike P. Taylor, the three writers of SVPOW

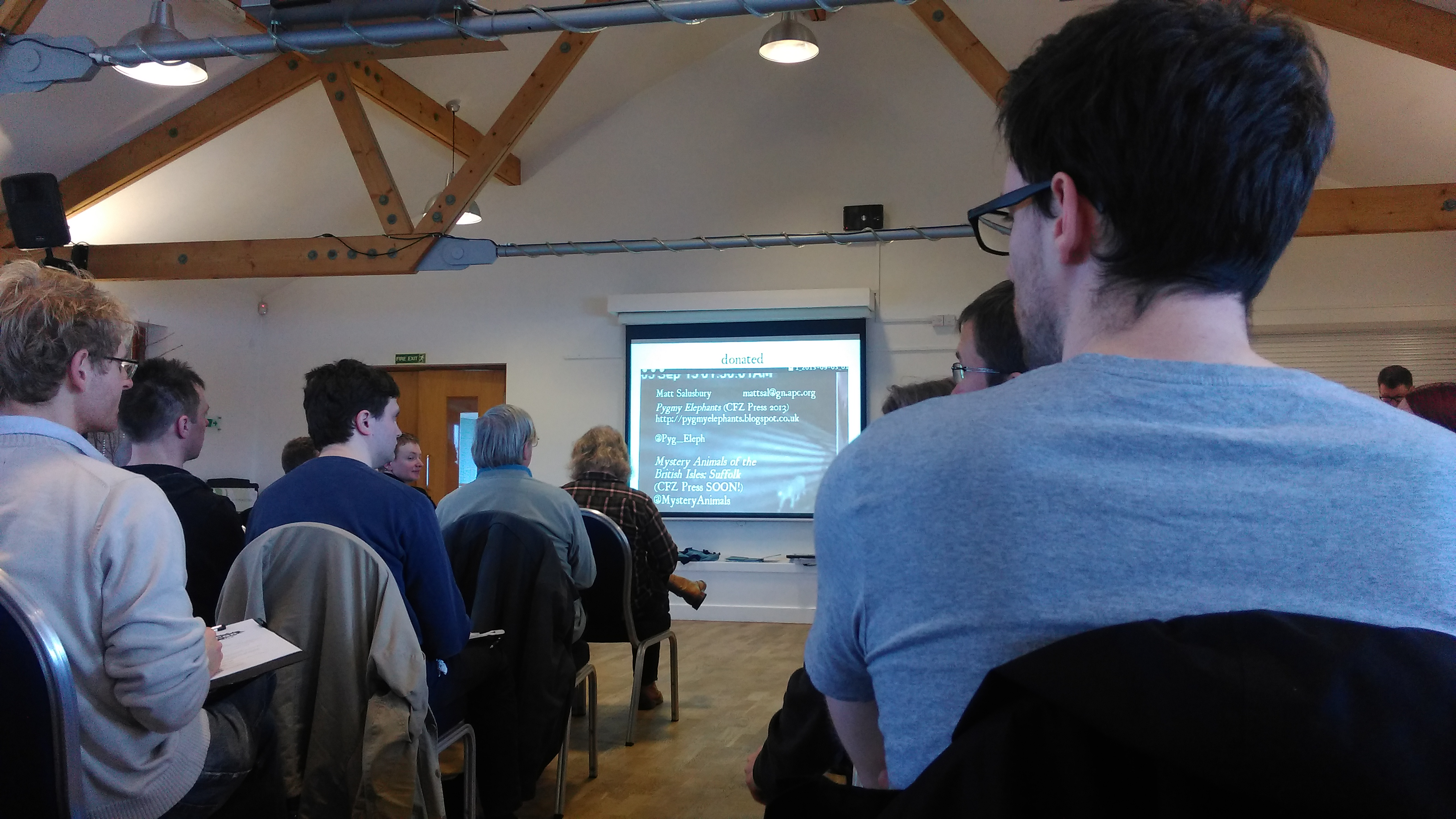
TetZooCon 2015, London Wetland Centre

In 2006, Naish started a weblog, Tetrapod Zoology, that covered various aspects of zoology. In 2007, he joined the ScienceBlogs network. In July 2011, the blog moved to the Scientific American blog network, as of 31 July 2018 the blog has moved away from Scientific American and is hosted independently. Tetrapod Zoology covers various subjects concerning tetrapods. Topics have included frogs, reptiles, mammals, birds, dinosaurs, pterosaurs and cryptozoology. Together with colleagues Michael P. Taylor and Mathew Wedel, Naish also contributes to the Sauropod Vertebra Picture of the Week blog.

In 2010, Naish published a collection of early articles from Tetrapod Zoology as a book titled Tetrapod Zoology Book One.

=== Tetrapod Zoology ===
The Tetrapod Zoology Podcast was launched on 1 February 2013 and is the official podcast of the TetZooVerse. The podcast covers all things tetrapod and vertebrate palaeontology. The podcast is hosted by Naish and co-host John Conway, For episode 15 the regular hosts were joined by Memo Kosemen, co-author and artist of Cryptozoologicon.

== Convention organisation ==
=== TetZooCon ===
Naish and Conway co-organised the annual TetZooCon event, often participating in those conferences by giving guest talks. TetZooCon was a convention featuring talks and workshops on natural history, with content reflecting that of the Tetrapod Zoology blog. The convention was first held on 12 July 2014 at the London Wetland Centre, and subsequently took place in various venues in London over the following years. The largest TetZooCon was the 11th and final conference, held from 27 to 29 September 2024, which attracted 330 registered attendees and over 30 stalls.

=== DinoCon ===
Naish and Conway co-organise the annual DinoCon event, in partnership with PalaeoGames Ltd, as well as participating in the conferences through talks and book signings. DinoCon is an annual palaeontology-themed convention in the United Kingdom. It follows TetZooCon as its successor. DinoCon is hosted at the University of Exeter, in the Great Hall and Devonshire House. It was first held in Exeter from 16 to 17 August 2025, attracting 860 attendees. The second DinoCon conference is scheduled to be held on 25 to 26 July 2026. DinoCon is promoted by its organisers as the largest meeting dedicated to palaeontology ever held in the United Kingdom.

== Publications ==
=== Books ===
- White, Steve; Naish, Darren (2025). Mesozoic Art II: Dinosaurs and Other Ancient Animals in Art. Bloomsbury Publishing plc.
- Naish, Darren; White, Steve (2022). Mesozoic Art: Dinosaurs and Other Ancient Animals in Art. Bloomsbury Publishing plc.
- Naish, Darren (2023). Ancient Sea Reptiles: Plesiosaurs, Ichthyosaurs, Mosasaurs, and More. Smithsonian Books. ISBN 1-58834-727-3. Archived from the original on 21 March 2026.
- Naish, Darren (30 November 2021), Dinopedia: A Brief Compendium of Dinosaur Lore, Princeton, New Jersey: Princeton University Press, doi:10.2307/j.ctv1jhvnfz.13, ISBN 0-691-21202-3, archived from the original on 21 March 2026
- Naish, Darren (2017). Evolution in Minutes. New York, New York: Quercus. ISBN 1-68144-064-4. OCLC 1013543810. Archived from the original on 21 March 2026.
- Naish, Darren (September 2017). Hunting monsters: cryptozoology and the reality behind the myths. London: Sirius. ISBN 1-78428-862-4. OCLC 973280941. Archived from the original on 21 March 2026.
- Naish, Darren & Barrett, Paul M. (2016). Dinosaurs: How they lived and evolved. London: Smithsonian Books. ISBN 1-58834-582-3. OCLC 948337113. Archived from the original on 21 March 2026.
- Naish, Darren (2015). Jurassic record breakers. London: Carlton Kids. ISBN 978-1-78312-118-2. OCLC 903763981. Archived from the original on 21 March 2026.
- Conway, John; Kosemen, C. M. & Naish, Darren (2013). Cryptozoologicon: the biology, evolution, and mythology of hidden animals: volume 1. Irregular Books. ASIN B00GDF7OAK. ISBN 978-1-291-62153-2. OCLC 870904128. Archived from the original on 21 March 2026.
- Naish, Darren; Kosemen, C. M. & Conway, John (2012). All Yesterdays: Unique and Speculative Views of Dinosaurs and Other Prehistoric Animals eBook. Irregular Books. ASIN B00A2VS55O. Archived from the original on 1 April 2019 – via amazon.com.
- Kosemen, C. M.; Conway, John & Naish, Darren (2013). All Your Yesterdays: Unique and Speculative Views of Dinosaurs and Other Prehistoric Animals. Irregular Books. ISBN 1-291-17712-4. Archived from the original on 20 March 2026.
- Naish, Darren (2018). Dinosaur Record Breakers: The biggest, fastest and deadliest dinos ever!. London: Carlton Books. ISBN 1-78312-071-1. OCLC 1020279192. Archived from the original on 20 March 2026.
- Naish, Darren (2010). Tetrapod zoology. Book one. Naish, Darren (2nd ed.). Woolsery, North Devon (England): CFZ Press. ISBN 1-905723-61-X. OCLC 703648654. Archived from the original on 20 March 2026.
- Naish, Darren (2010). Dinosaurs life size (1st ed.). Hauppauge, New York: Barron's Educational Series. ISBN 1-84773-783-8. OCLC 606761894. Archived from the original on 20 March 2026.
- Naish, Darren (2009). The great dinosaur discoveries. London: A & C Black. ISBN 0-520-25975-0. OCLC 320494340. Archived from the original on 20 March 2026.
- Martill, David M. & Naish, Darren, eds. (2001). The Palaeontological Association Field Guide to Fossils: Dinosaurs of the Isle of Wight: No. 10 (Palaentology FG Fossils). London: Palaeontological Association. ISBN 0-901702-72-2. OCLC 47747920. Archived from the original on 26 July 2024.
- Martill, David M. & Naish, Darren (2000). Walking with dinosaurs: the evidence - How Did They Know That?. London: BBC Worldwide. ISBN 0-563-53743-4. OCLC 47696397. Archived from the original on 20 March 2026.

=== Journal articles ===
- Hutt, Stephen; Naish, Darren; Martill, Daid M.; Barker, Michael J. & Newbery, Penny (2001). "A preliminary account of a new tyrannosauroid theropod from the Wessex Formation (Cretaceous) of southern England" (PDF). Cretaceous Research. 22: 227–242. doi:10.1006/cres.2001.0252. Archived (PDF) from the original on 24 November 2025.
- Naish, Darren & Dyke, Gareth J. (2004). "Heptasteornis was no ornithomimid, troodontid, dromaeosaurid or owl: the first alvarezsaurid (Dinosauria: Theropoda) from Europe". Neues Jahrbuch für Geologie und Paläontologie – Monatshefte (subscription). 7: 385–401. doi:10.1127/njgpm/2004/2004/385. Archived from the original on 5 August 2025.
- Naish, Darren & Martill, Daid M. (2007). "Dinosaurs of Great Britain and the role of the Geological Society of London in their discovery: basal Dinosauria and Saurischia". Journal of the Geological Society (subscription). 164. London: 493–510. doi:10.1144/0016-76492006-032. Archived from the original on 20 March 2026.
- Naish, Darren & Martill, Daid M. (2008). "Dinosaurs of Great Britain and the role of the Geological Society of London in their discovery: Ornithischia". Journal of the Geological Society (subscription). 165. London: 613–623. doi:10.1144/0016-76492006-032. Archived from the original on 20 March 2026.
- Naish, Darren; Martill, Daid M.; Cooper, Darren & Stevens, Kent A. (2004). "Europe's largest dinosaur? A giant brachiosaurid cervical vertebra from the Wessex Formation (Early Cretaceous) of southern England". Cretaceous Research (subscription). 25: 787–795. doi:10.1006/cres.2001.0252. Archived from the original on 14 March 2023.
- Naish, Darren; Martill, Daid M. & Frey, Eberhard (2004). "Ecology, Systematics and Biogeographical Relationships of Dinosaurs, Including a New Theropod, from the Santana Formation (?Albian, Early Cretaceous) of Brazil" (PDF). Historical Biology (subscription): 1–14. doi:10.1080/08912960410001674200. Archived (PDF) from the original on 21 February 2026.
- Moody, Richard T. J.; Buffetaut, Eric; Naish, Darren & Martill, Daid M. (2010). "Dinosaurs and other extinct saurians: a historical perspective". Geological Society, London, Special Publications. 33. London. doi:10.1144/SP343.1. ISBN 978-1-86239-311-0. OCLC 665581198. Archived from the original on 27 December 2025.
- Knell, Robert J.; Naish, Darren; Tomkins, Joseph L. & Hone, David W.E. (2013). "Sexual selection in prehistoric animals: detection and implications". Trends in Ecology & Evolution. 28 (1): 38–47. doi:10.1016/j.tree.2012.07.015. Archived from the original on 27 November 2024.

== See also ==
- All Yesterdays
