= John Conway (palaeoartist) =

Palaeoartist and illustrator

- Known for: Palaeoart and illustration
- Website: johnconway.co

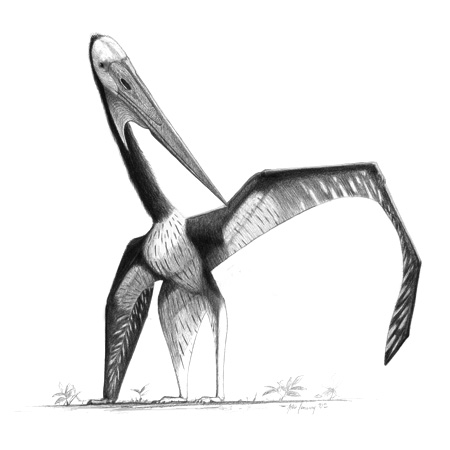
Life restoration of the pterosaur Zhejiangopterus, by Conway

John Conway is an Australian palaeoartist and illustrator who specializes primarily in Mesozoic reptiles and pterosaurs in particular. His works include the 2012 book All Yesterdays in collaboration with C. M. Kosemen, Darren Naish, and Scott Hartman.
