= Robert Conway (admiral) =

United States Navy Admiral

Robert T. Conway, Jr.
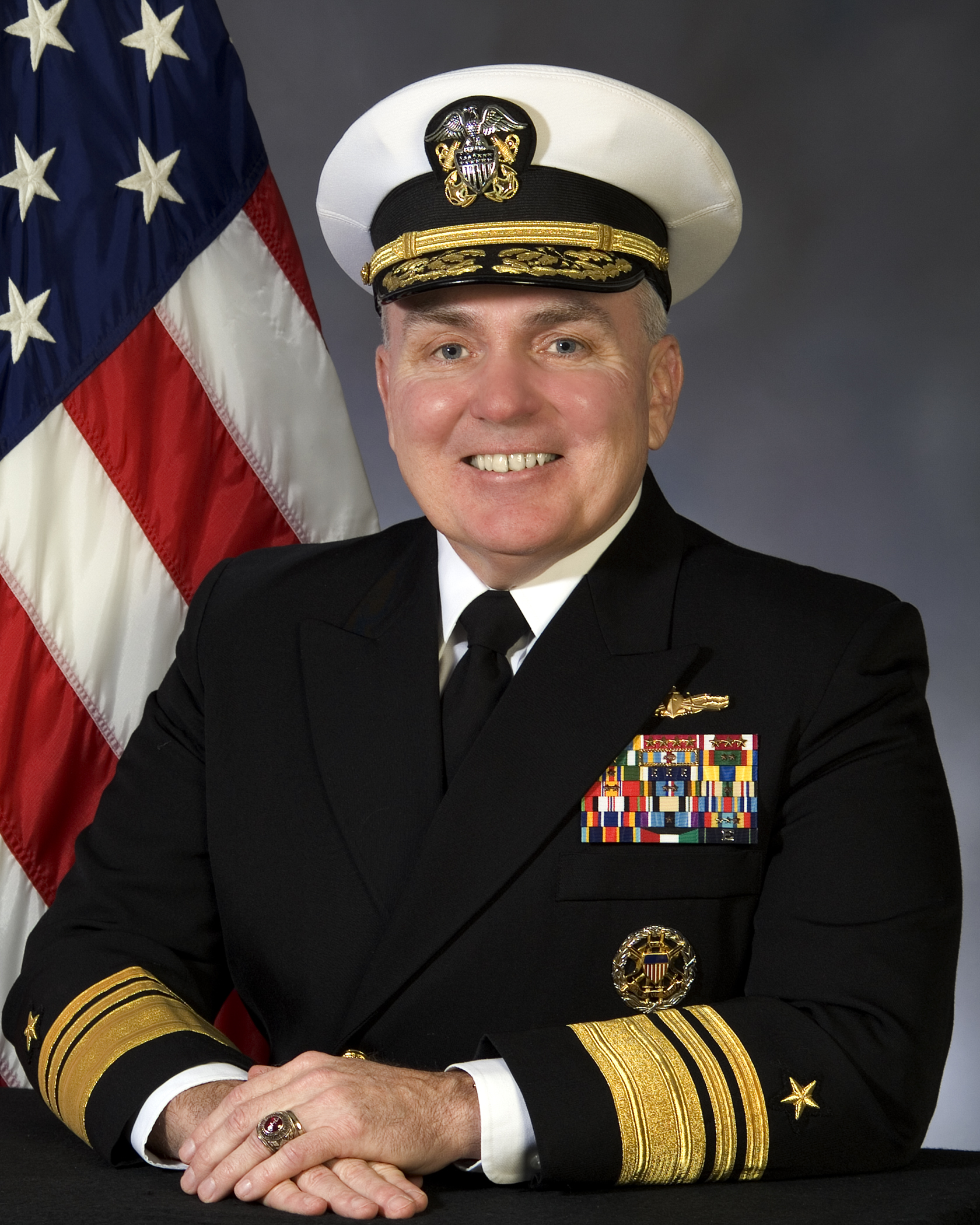
- Born: Wilkes-Barre, Pennsylvania
- Military career
- Allegiance: United States
- Branch: United States Navy
- Service years: 1972–2009
- Rank: Vice Admiral
- Awards: Distinguished Service Medal; Defense Superior Service Medal; Legion of Merit (6 awards); Meritorious Service Medal (4 awards); Navy Commendation Medal (2 awards)

Vice Admiral Robert Thomas Conway Jr., is a retired officer in the United States Navy, who retired from active service on 1 April 2009. His last assignment was commander of Navy Installations Command, Washington D.C., where he led a startup organization of 18 navy admirals and senior executives, 60,000 military staff, government employees and contractors, in the management of 80 navy bases worldwide.

He previously served in various leadership positions at sea aboard numerous combatant vessels, including USS Vesole (DD-878), USS Towers (DDG-9), USS Bainbridge (CGN-25), USS Gridley (CG-21), and USS John Young (DD-973). Ashore, Vice Admiral Conway's assignments included Naval Facility Cape Hatteras, Buxton, N.C.; Officer Candidate School, Newport, R.I.; Joint Chiefs of Staff, Washington, D.C.; Bureau of Naval Personnel Washington, D.C. & Millington, Tenn; Operational Test and Evaluation Force Pacific, Coronado, Calif.

== Background ==
Born in Wilkes-Barre, Pennsylvania, and a 1972 graduate of Saint Francis University, Loretto, Pennsylvania. Vice Admiral Conway graduated with a Bachelor of Arts and joined the navy through Officer Candidate School, and was commissioned as an Ensign the same year. He went on to receive his master's degree from Providence University, Providence, Rhode Island. He also is a graduate of the National Defense University's, Industrial College of the Armed Forces, Washington, D.C. as well as numerous business and leadership schools.

His assignments have been varied and include seven operational commands; Conway has commanded USS John Young (DD-973); Destroyer Squadron 7; Expeditionary Strike Group 1; Navy Region Hawaii; Naval Surface Forces Middle Pacific; and Task Force WARRIOR. Prior to his retirement, he served as commander of Naval Installations Command at the Washington Navy Yard; Washington, D.C.

He is currently president of his own consulting company: R.T. Conway & Associates Inc, of Delray Beach, Florida, specializing in Critical Infrastructure, Renewable Energy, Port Security, Operations and Information Technology.

== Decorations ==
Throughout his many years of dedicated service to the navy, Conway received several decorations, including:

- Distinguished Service Medal
- Defense Superior Service Medal
- Legion of Merit (6 awards)
- Meritorious Service Medal (4 awards)
- Navy Commendation Medal (2 awards)
- Various Campaign and Unit Awards.
