= Quadratic (collection) =

1953 collection of science fiction works

- Dust-jacket from the first edition
- Editor: William L. Crawford
- Cover artist: Walter
- Language: English
- Genre: Science fiction
- Publisher: Fantasy Publishing Company, Inc.
- Publication date: 1953
- Publication place: United States
- Media type: Print (hardback)
- Pages: 580 pp
- OCLC: 36939070

Quadratic is a collection of four science fiction works by Olaf Stapledon and Murray Leinster. It was edited by William L. Crawford and published in 1953 by Fantasy Publishing Company, Inc. in an edition of 300 copies. The book is an omnibus of Stapledon's Worlds of Wonder and Leinster's Murder Madness, created by combining unbound sheets from the publisher's previous editions of the two volumes.

== Contents ==
- Death into Life, by Olaf Stapledon
- The Flames, by Olaf Stapledon
- Old Man in a New World, by Olaf Stapledon
- Murder Madness, by Murray Leinster
