= Saints and Revolutionaries =

1939 nonfiction book by Olaf Stapledon

- Author: Olaf Stapledon
- Language: English
- Genre: Non-fiction
- Publisher: Heinemann
- Publication date: 1939
- Publication place: United Kingdom

Saints and Revolutionaries is a non-fiction work by the writer and philosopher Olaf Stapledon, published by Heinemann in 1939.

The book was part of the I Believe series, an initiative whereby leading British intellectuals of the day could pursue an argument pertinent to the times. Stapledon's friend Naomi Mitchison also contributed a volume to the series, as did J. D. Beresford, whose 1911 novel The Hampdenshire Wonder was an inspiration for Stapledon's own novel, Odd John.

== Overview ==
Stapledon's book pursues themes familiar to readers of his science fiction – the universe and humanity's place in it, both personally and as a species. He argues that humanity is undergoing a period of rapid change and that our beliefs, and the nature of belief itself, are changing.

== Contents ==
1. To-day
2. Saints, and Pacifism
3. Sceptics, and Morality
4. Revolutionaries, and Metaphysics
5. Mainly Speculation

== Relation to Stapledon's other works ==
To an extent, the themes and preoccupations of Saints and Revolutionaries can be said to be present in most of Stapledon's fiction and philosophy. However, the posthumously published Nebula Maker is closest in theme, as its two main protagonists embody these two roles.
