= Worlds of Wonder (collection) =

- Dust-jacket from the first edition
- Author: Olaf Stapledon
- Cover artist: Jack Gaughan
- Language: English
- Genre: Science fiction
- Publisher: Fantasy Publishing Company, Inc.
- Publication date: 1949
- Publication place: United States
- Media type: Print (hardback)
- Pages: 282 pp
- OCLC: 1813201

Worlds of Wonder is a collection of three science fiction works by Olaf Stapledon: a short novel, a novella and a short story. It was published in 1949 by Fantasy Publishing Company, Inc. in an edition of 500 copies. All of the stories had originally been published in the United Kingdom.

== Contents ==
- Death into Life
- The Flames
- Old Man in a New World
