= Future history =

Narrative convention in speculative fiction

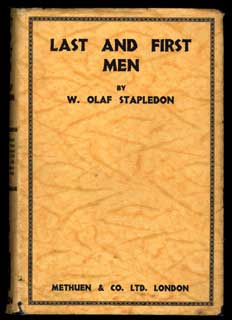
1930 science fiction novel Last and First Men by Olaf Stapledon is considered one of the important early classics of the future history genre.

Future history, also anticipatory history or imaginary history, is a narrative convention in science fiction and other speculative fiction involving the presentation of fictional future events as a coherent historical process, encompassing the development of societies, civilizations, or humanity as a whole. It may take the form of a single work, but is most often realized in literary cycles, in which individual texts depict different stages in the history of the same world. The term can also be used to describe the subgenre of science fiction that uses this framework.

The scope of the concept of future history is problematic, since in a broad sense nearly any speculative narrative set in the future could be considered an example. In a stricter sense, however, the term refers to works in which processes of historical change play a role as significant as plot and character, and the depicted world is presented as a developing social and cultural system. Compared to other genres, such works place greater emphasis on historical processes and social transformations, and less on individual destinies; they may also adopt structures similar to historiography.

Future histories differ from alternate history, in which different outcomes are ascribed to past events.

== Origins ==
Future history is a phenomenon typical of modern literature, associated with growing interest in historical processes and attempts to interpret and predict them. Its development is linked to experiences of rapid social change, advances in science and technology, and uncertainty about the future of humanity.

The emergence of the future history convention is connected with intellectual transformations of the 19th century, when the development of historiography, along with the influence of evolutionary theory and social thought, led to viewing history as a dynamic process extending into the future. During this period, the future began to be treated not only as a teleological endpoint of history, but also as a potential space for literary narrative, analogous to the past previously used in the historical novel. Works about the past show how humanity has changed, while works about the future show how it may change. The emergence of the genre stems from the need to predict future events or influence the direction of civilization's development, as well as from the belief that historical processes follow certain laws that can be understood and described.

== History ==
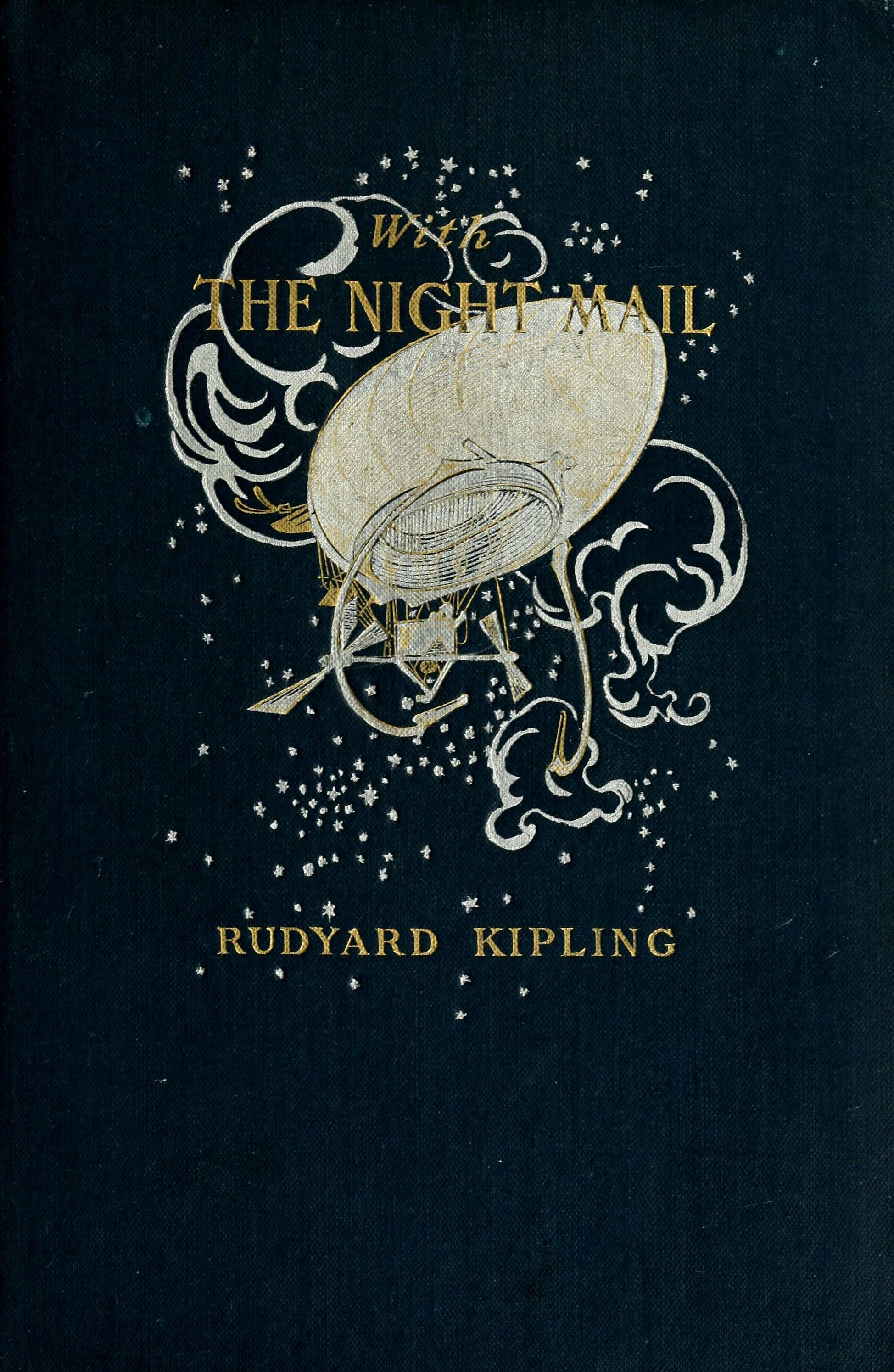
Cover of "With the Night Mail"

Early examples of this convention include works that present the future as a historical process unfolding over time. These include late 18th-century works such as The Year 2440 (L'An 2440) by Louis-Sébastien Mercier (1770), The Ruins; Or, a Survey of the Revolutions of Empires (Les Ruines, ou méditation sur les révolutions des empires, 1791) by Constantin François de Chassebœuf, comte de Volney, and later 19th-century works such as The Last Man (1826) by Mary Shelley, The Mummy! (1827) by Jane Loudon, Three Hundred Years Hence (1881) by William Delisle Hay, and early 20th-century works such as The Decline and Fall of the British Empire (1905) by Elliott E. Mills and Mountains Seas and Giants (Berge Meere und Giganten, 1924) by Alfred Döblin.

Although most works classified as future history are novels, early forms resembling this mode can also be found in short stories by Rudyard Kipling, such as "With the Night Mail" (1905) and "As Easy as A.B.C." (1912), which use documents, commentary, and appendices to depict the development of institutions over time, suggesting a broader historical process. The genre also existed outside Western literature. For example, in Polish literature, a pioneering work was Adam Mickiewicz's A History of the Future (Historia przyszłości, an unfinished work from the 1820s–1830s), while other notable examples include the 20th-century novella "Zemsta" (Revenge) by Bolesław Prus and the novel Antychryst. Powieść z ostatnich dni świata (Antichrist. Novel from the last days of the world 1920) by Jan Gnatowski (pen name Jan Łada).

In science fiction, the first major works in this convention include those of Olaf Stapledon, particularly Last and First Men (1930) and Star Maker (1937), which present expansive visions of the future history of humanity and the cosmos. Last and First Men in particular depicts human history on a cosmic scale spanning billions of years and multiple species of humanity. Other early contributors include Laurence Manning, Neil R. Jones, and H. G. Wells (The Shape of Things to Come, 1933).

Wells emphasized the idea that the future could be subject to scientific forecasting, analogous to methods used in the natural sciences. In "The Discovery of the Future" (1902), he suggested the possibility of constructing detailed models of future social processes based on available data, a concept later reflected in works such as the psychohistory of Isaac Asimov.

The most influential early example is the work of Robert A. Heinlein, who in the 1940s developed an extensive timeline known as the Future History (consisting of numerous novels, such as the Sixth Column (1949), Methuselah's Children (1958) and Time Enough For Love (1973)). An early version appeared in Astounding Science Fiction in 1941 where Methuselah's Children was serialized; according to Langford, the term "future history" was coined at that time, although the Historical Dictionary of Science Fiction traces its first usage to a letter published in 1937 in Thrilling Wonder Stories.

Later developments of large-scale histories spanning vast time periods include Asimov's Foundation series and works by authors such as Brian Aldiss (Galaxies like Grains of Sand, 1959), Cordwainer Smith (Instrumentality of Mankind universe), and Jack Vance (Gaean Reach). Also mentioned by critics, in this contexts, are works such as the Xeelee sequence by Stephen Baxter and the Revelation Space universe by Alastair Reynolds. Other examples include works by Poul Anderson (Technic History universe), John Barnes (Century Next Door series), Lois McMaster Bujold (Vorkosigan Saga), C. J. Cherryh (Alliance-Union), Gordon R. Dickson, David Drake (Hammerverse), the Dune series by Frank Herbert, the Hainish Cycle by Ursula K. Le Guin, Liu Cixin's Remembrance of Earth's Past series, the Heechee Saga by Frederik Pohl, Jerry Pournelle (CoDominium), and Bruce Sterling's Shaper/Mechanist universe. In television, a prominent example is Star Trek.

The classifications of some works as future history is debatable. Some have been described by critics as "set within a loose future-history context", for example, Lois McMaster Bujold's Miles Vorkosigan series.

== Characteristics ==
Andrew Sawyer noted that virtually any science fiction work set in the future could be loosely described as "future history", making it necessary to narrow the definition. Not all future-set works meet the criteria; the term is reserved for narratives in which the world undergoes clearly depicted historical processes rather than serving merely as a backdrop.

Sawyer, in his essay "Future History" in The Routledge Companion to Science Fiction defines future history as works in which "the processes of historical change are as important as the characters' stories". According to David Langford in The Encyclopedia of Science Fiction, future history is a type of science fiction that describes not just a single segment of a future world, but its history, often across multiple works covering different periods. Andrzej Niewiadowski and Antoni Smuszkiewicz, authors of the Leksykon polskiej literatury fantastycznonaukowej (Lexicon of Polish Science Fiction Literature) define it as works depicting events "presented as natural, logical consequences of an unfolding historical process and of events known to the author". The Historical Dictionary of Science Fiction describes it as "a fictional, self-contained, consistent, chronological framework (esp. realized across a body of work)", while Don D'Ammassa in his Encyclopedia of Science Fiction defines it as a group of stories or novels, usually by one author, set in a consistent future reality and often depicting the transformation of human society over time. Brian Stableford in his Historical Dictionary of Science Fiction Literature describes it as a framework external to a series of stories, serving as a background for their expansion. George Mann in his The Mammoth Encyclopedia of Science Fiction defined it as a "framework of future events constructed by an author to offer a detailed background of 'history' to their own particular vision of the future. Usually, a series of plots will be interwoven within this framework to create a loose sequence, and to provide some frame of human reference, although this is not always the case."

Future history is sometimes considered related to political fiction, though the latter typically offers a narrower scope focused on specific issues rather than long-term historical development.

Future history often employs elaborate narrative structures, such as chronologies, fictional documents, encyclopedias, and footnotes, to lend the depicted events a semblance of historical authenticity. These may take metafictional forms, presenting the future as the subject of study by later generations, as in The Handmaid's Tale by Margaret Atwood, the appendix on Newspeak in Nineteen Eighty-Four by George Orwell, or Arthur C. Clarke's "History Lesson". Retrospective narration from a distant future is also common, as in Stapledon or Cordwainer Smith. Similar techniques appear in Wells and in the Encyclopedia Galactica of Asimov's Foundation series.

Comparable narrative strategies also appear in non-fictional or quasi-scientific works, such as A Short History of the Future (1955) by R. C. Churchill.

Future histories consisting of multiple works are sometimes developed gradually rather than planned in advance.

=== Ostrowski's concept of imaginary history ===
Polish linguist Witold Ostrowski differentiated the concept of imaginary history, which according to him adopts the narrative form of historiography while maintaining a fictional character. Unlike conventional fiction, it focuses on historical processes rather than individual characters. Its style resembles scientific or historiographical writing, often avoiding metaphor and literary ornamentation. As a result, narration tends to be factual, detached, and "dry", with minimal or no dialogue. Such works differ from traditional fiction in scope: whereas fiction focuses on individuals, future history depicts the history of societies or humanity. Characters, if present, play secondary roles. It also differs from the historical novel, which deals with real past events, while future history operates with fictional events, usually on a macrohistorical scale. Polish critics Niewiadowski and Smuszkiewicz consider Ostrowski"s concept related but not identical to the usual SF understanding of future history, noting that it includes alternate history but excludes narrative fiction and historical fantasy set in invented countries.

== Functions ==
An important feature of future history is its interpretative function: such works serve as commentary on historical processes and the development of civilization. Authors aim not to convince readers of the truth of events, but to present the plausibility of historical processes.

Future history also has a reflective function, enabling analysis of the present through projection into the future. By depicting long-term developments, it explores tensions between historical determinism and contingency, suggesting that the future is both conditioned and open.

The convention also highlights the narrative nature of historiography itself, presenting history as a construct shaped by selection and interpretation. Many works are based on implicit theories of history, often inspired by concepts of the rise and fall of civilizations, allowing authors to portray the future as an ordered yet unpredictable process. For example, the social cycle theory that argues due to the immutable nature of humanity, historical situations are likely to repeat themselves has inspired many narratives, from Asimov's Foundation (based on the fall of the Roman Empire) to Robert A. Heinlein's The Moon Is a Harsh Mistress (1966), which repackages the story of the American Revolutionary War. Theories of scholars like Arnold Toynbee and Oswald Spengler, arguing that all cultures go through the similar processes of rise and decline, have influenced James Blish's Cities in Flight series, Charles L. Harness's The Paradox Men (1953) and A.E. van Vogt's The Voyage of the Space Beagle (1950), among others.

Familiarity with the imagined story that readers have gleaned from earlier works in the series can save the author from repeating the same information and add depth to the presented story, but assuming that this information is already known to readers can be a hindrance for new readers.

== See also ==
- Alternate future
- Near future in fiction
- Far future in fiction
- Futures studies
- List of stories set in a future now in the past
- Post-apocalyptic science fiction
- Retroactive continuity
- World War III
- Pseudo-documentary (alternate-history novels written in the style of textbooks)
