= Tomorrow's Yesterday =

1932 British science fiction novel

- Author: John Gloag
- Language: English
- Genre: Science fiction, satire
- Publisher: Allen & Unwin
- Publication date: 1932

Tomorrow's Yesterday, sometimes formatted as To-morrow's Yesterday, is a science fiction novel by English author John Gloag published by Allen & Unwin in 1932. A revised version was reprinted in First One and Twenty in 1946.

Tomorrow's Yesterday depicts a race of cat people from the distant future observing human society, which has reverted to barbarism after a destructive war. It was inspired by the work of H. G. Wells and Gloag's friend Olaf Stapledon, as well as Gloag's own experiences serving in the Welsh Guards during World War I.
