= The Little Candle =

1939 science fiction short story by Ben Hecht

The Little Candle is a near future science fiction short story or novella by American writer Ben Hecht, first published in his collection A Book of Miracles (June 1939). It is notable for its prediction that in the near future Nazi Germany would carry out a pogrom of Jews of then-unprecedented proportions. It is considered one of the earliest works of the Holocaust fiction genre.

== Plot ==
The story describes a near future during which Nazi Germany carries out a carefully planned "International Pogrom", in which half a million Jews would perish. Hecht portrays the pogrom as happening overnight in Germany, Italy, Romania and Poland. In addition to half a million dead, he wrote of thousands of others who went mad, became refugees, or were locked in concentration camps. The events are told from the viewpoint of a Jewish congregation in New York City, whose members learn of this from a newspaper; their rabbi takes his own life, but a miracle is also observed.

== Reception and analysis ==
Julien Gorbach, in his biography of Hecht, noted that most critics and reviewers "were moved" by the story, agreeing that "it was the best fiction he ever wrote", although the book was not widely read. However, a number of reviewers considered the vision of half a million Jews being killed in a pogrom as rather farfetched; even Hecht's publisher suggested to him that a smaller figure, in the range of 50,000, would be better.

Contemporary reviews of the story have been described as "dismissive" and calling the story "outlandish". However, later writers described the work as an "eerie prediction", "an uncanny, horrifyingly vivid prophecy of the catastrophe that was about to come" and "prefigur[ing] the imminent genocide".

John Clute and John Eggeling in The Encyclopedia of Science Fiction called it the "first (and perhaps the only significant) example" of prediction in the Holocaust fiction genre.

The book was published in June 1939; the story was written after Hecht learned of the events of Kristallnacht in the previous year and it marked the beginning of Hecht's transformation into a pro-Jewish activist. At the time Hecht wrote his story, he had become a vocal critic of Nazi Germany and its growing anti-semitism.
