= Far future in fiction =

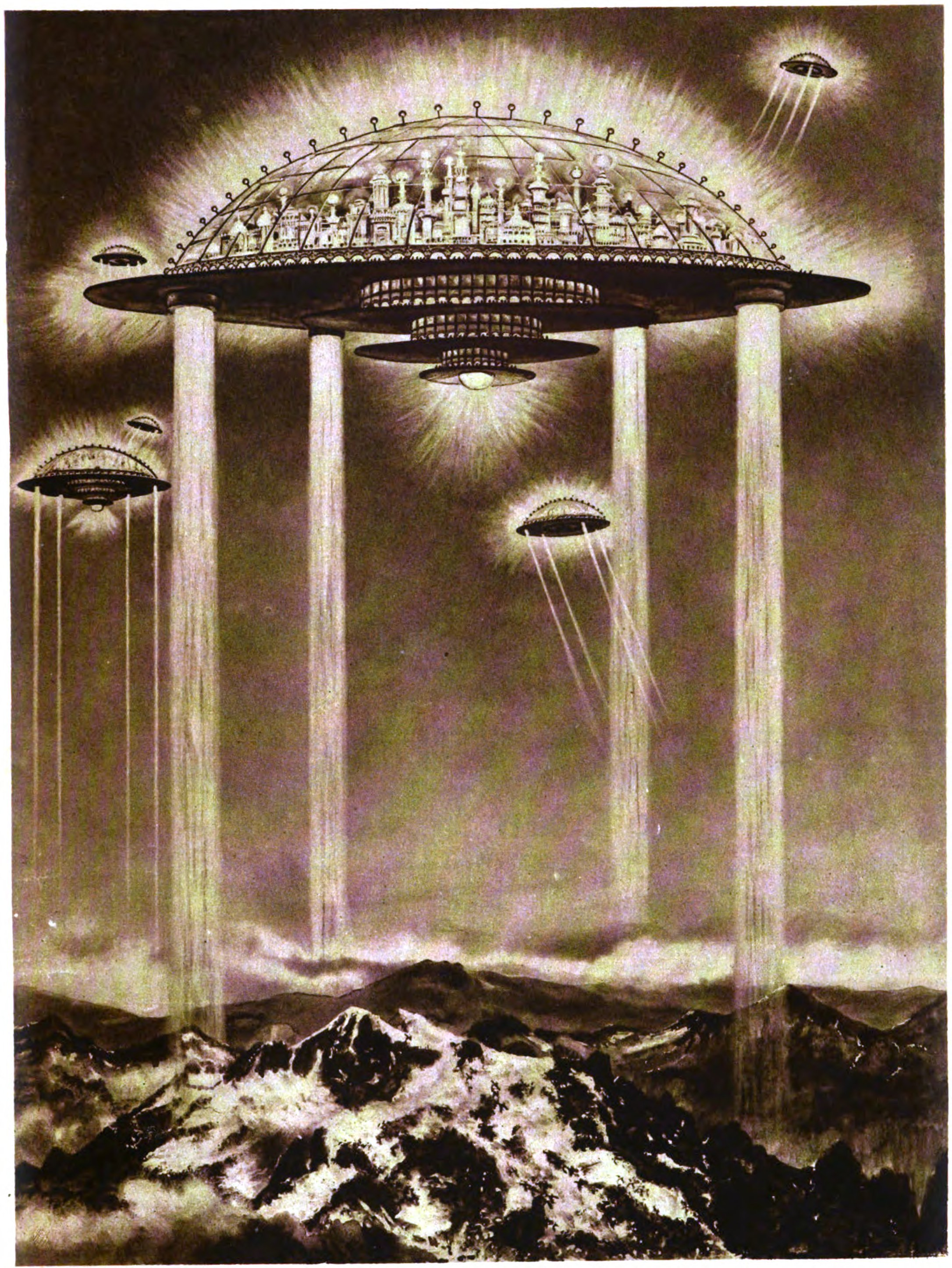
A fictional vision from 1922 of a floating city in 10,000 years, illustrating a Hugo Gernsback speculative article

The far future has been used as a setting in many works of science fiction. The far future setting arose in the late 19th century, as earlier writers had little understanding of concepts such as deep time and its implications for the nature of humankind. Classic examples of this genre include works such as H.G. Wells' The Time Machine (1895) or Olaf Stapledon's Last and First Men (1930). Recurring themes include themes such as utopias, eschatology or the ultimate fate of the universe. Many works also overlap with other genres such as space opera, science fantasy or apocalyptic and post-apocalyptic fiction.

== Genre origins ==
Brian Stableford and David Langford argue that the genre could not exist until the true scale of geological time, and the theory of evolution and its implications for the nature of humankind, were fully understood. Likewise, Russell Blackford tied the emergence of the genre with the more recent concept of deep time.

== Examples ==
As a result, the earliest stories in the genre date to the end of the 19th century, and include W.H. Hudson's A Crystal Age (1887) and H.G. Wells' The Time Machine (1895). Classic examples of the genre from the first half of the 20th century include Olaf Stapledon's Last and First Men (1930) and Arthur C. Clarke's Against the Fall of Night (1948). Later examples include Brian Aldiss' The Long Afternoon of Earth (1962), Michael Moorcock's Dancers at the End of Time series (1972–1976), Stephen Baxter's Xeelee Sequence series (1986–), Paul J. McAuley's Confluence trilogy (1997–1999) and Alastair Reynolds's Revelation Space series (2000–), as well as numerous works by Robert Silverberg, Doris Piserchia and Michael G. Coney.

The far future fantasy subgenre begun with Clark Ashton Smith's Zothique stories (representing the far future fantasy subgenre), with the first work in the series published in 1932, with other influential authors here being Jack Vance (Dying Earth, 1950) Damian Broderick (Sorcerer's World, 1970) and Gene Wolfe (The Book of the New Sun, 1980).

Short stories about far future have been collected in a number of anthologies, such as Far Futures (1997) and One Million AD (2006).

== Themes ==
The concept of the far future is hard to define precisely, but a common element of such stories is to show the society that is "so completely transformed from the present day as to be almost unrecognizable". George Mann noted that the common themes in far future works are those of "entropy and dissolution".

The future of human evolution is considered a classic theme, harkening to H.G. Wells' The Time Machine and its division of the human race into two subspecies, the Eloi and the Morlocks. Many later works build on this idea, exploring futures in which humans themselves evolve into post-material forms of energy or software, and this theme.

Another recurring theme is the post-apocalyptic one, related to the Dying Earth genre, or the suppression of humanity by more powerful beings, such as robots, artificial intelligences, technologically advanced aliens, or god-like beings of pure energy. Where humanity is not being eradicated, space travel and time travel themes also make relatively frequent appearances, as tools of sufficiently advanced, future civilizations; the former theme also marks an overlap with the more epic works of the space opera genre.

Some writers attempt to outline a future history of humanity or even the universe, with one of the first works attempting this being Olaf Stapledon, whose 1930 classic work was entitled Last and First Men: A Story of the Near and Far Future.

Sometimes the far future genre moves from science fiction to fantasy, showing a society where civilization has regressed to the point where older technologies are no longer understood and are seen as magic. This subgenre is sometimes known as the "far future fantasy" and partially overlaps with the science fantasy genre. At the same time, the relics of a technological past "protruding into a more primitive... landscape", a theme known as the "Ruined earth", have been described as "among the most potent of SF's icons".

Dutch historian and sociologist Fred Polak distinguished between two categories of works about the future, "future of prophecy" and "future of destiny". The former is concerned about the present and uses the future as an opportunity to warn about the dangers of the present that should be avoided, often touching upon dystopian themes. The latter category is broader and concerned more with exploring philosophical themes such as utopias, eschatology or the ultimate fate of the universe.

George Mann observed that this genre has produced "many excellent allegorical or moral tales". Russell Blackford concurred with this sentiment, however also noted that "some critics" have pointed to "essential conservatism" and "lack of social relevance" in far future narratives, as contrasted with near future ones, and those realistic predictions of far future are impossible, as humanity in the far future if it exists, is likely to be beyond our comprehension.

== See also ==
- Future history
- Far future in religion
- Hard science fiction
- List of stories set in a future now in the past
- Near future in fiction
- Omega Point
- Technological singularity
- Timeline of the far future
