= Alexander Gromov =

Russian science fiction writer

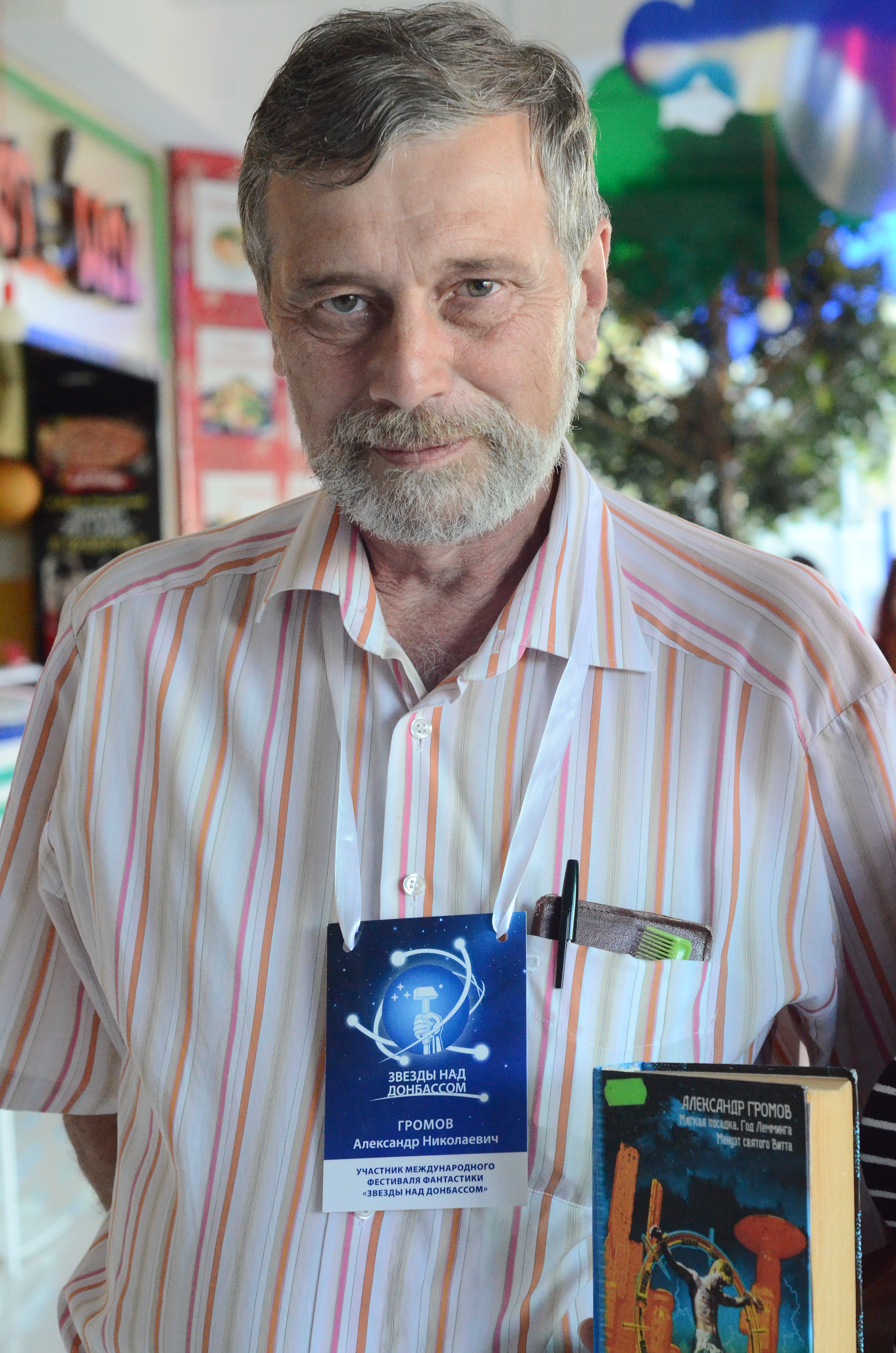
Gromov in 2020

Alexander Nikolayevich Gromov (Алекса́ндр Никола́евич Грóмов) is a Russian science fiction writer, who began writing in 1986 and was first published in the early 1990s.

His work is influenced by that of the Strugatsky brothers, and he has stated a preference for the social science fiction genre. He writes primarily in his native Russian language.

Gromov lives in Moscow, and is an amateur astronomer and former electronic engineer.

== Gromov's works ==
=== Soft Landing ===
Soft Landing (original Russian title: Myagkaya posadka) was published in 1995. The novel is set in Moscow, approximately at the end of the 21st century. The novel centers on the life of an ordinary man fighting for survival while new subspecies of Homo sapiens wage war against normal humans. Soft Landing received a Belyaev Award and Interpresscon Award in 1996.

=== Year of the Lemming ===
Year of the Lemming (original Russian title: God Lemminga), was published in 1997. It is a prequel to Soft Landing and is set in the year 2040. In the novel, the appearance of contagious diseases and unexpected technological failures has caused the establishment of four services that harshly monitor the life of humankind. The protagonist Michail Malakhov is faced with a suicide epidemic, the cure for which is being hidden by scientists.

=== Master of the Void ===
Master of the Void (original Russian title: Vlastelin Pustoty) was first published in 1997. The plot involves the transition of a nation in peaceful harmony with the natural world on a distant planet, to a phase of industrial dictatorship created to defend against outer aggression.

=== "Saint Vitus' Minuet" ===
St. Vitus' Minuet (Russian: Менуэт святого Витта, romanized: Menuet Svyatogo Vitta, lit. 'Minuet of Saint Witt'), published in 1997, is a novella which deals with an emerging society on an unexplored planet, and the psychological aspects of survival. Saint Vitus' Minuet won a Fancon Award in 1997.

== Genres and themes ==
While most of his novels have a well-defined hard scientific background, Gromov's stated main interest is social science fiction:

I still have to tell a couple of words about my works — not about each one, but about all of them. Most of the things I wrote can be considered social science fiction (not in the sense of "capitalism-socialism" — this topic does not interest me). The recipe of it, worked out by H. G. Wells, has not changed till the present day and looks like this: you take a socium (limited number of people is better — easier to work) and do some ugly thing to it, and then you sit and look at the consequences...

Two of Gromov's books focus on a theme of power in a social context: his novella Saint Vitus Minuet (Menuet Svyatogo Vitta, 1997), deals with an emerging society; the novel Master of the Void discusses the transition of a peaceful nation in harmony with nature to an aggressive industrial dictatorship. The latter examines the surrounding mechanisms of power in the fictional government as well as the protagonist's rise to leadership.
