= The Flames: A Fantasy =

1947 novel by Olaf Stapledon

- First edition
- Author: Olaf Stapledon
- Language: English
- Genre: Science fiction
- Publisher: Secker and Warburg
- Publication date: 1947
- Publication place: United Kingdom
- Media type: Print (Hardcover)
- Pages: 84

The Flames (subtitled "A Fantasy") is a science fiction novella by British writer and philosopher Olaf Stapledon. It was published by Secker and Warburg in 1947. The book received a mixed reception from critics and did not sell well.

== Overview ==
The story takes the form of a long letter written by one old university friend to another. The recipient of the letter, known only as "Thos" (a college nickname, short for "Doubting Thomas") introduces the strange document, from a friend known only as "Cass" (another nickname; short for "Cassandra", an allusion to the friend's apparently prophetic abilities). Cass is regarded as a harmless eccentric by his friends, but Thos notes that his prophecies and preoccupations, wild as they may seem, have a habit of coming true. Thos also notes, ominously, that Cass's letter "bears the address of a well-known mental home".

== Plot summary ==
Cass's letter, which forms the bulk of the novel, describes his contact with a bizarre form of alien species. Whilst holidaying in the Lake District, Cass is inexplicably drawn to a lump of rock, which he pockets and takes back with him to his room. There, he is driven to place the rock on the fire, and this action releases a bizarre form of alien life - a living flame, which has been trapped in the rock for millennia.

The flame reveals itself to be one of an ancient alien race who originated in the photosphere of the Sun. Solar catastrophe has distributed the ancient race throughout the planets of the Solar System, and the flame-beings can only be woken by intense heat. The flame and Cass discourse at great length about typically "Stapledonian" topics - the life of the spirit, the role of the individual and the purpose and meaning of the universe. Over the succeeding nights they develop a strange friendship, in which Cass reactivates the flame in his hearth, (which slumbers in the cold rock of the firebrick) with a hot coal fire.

Eventually, the flame reveals that it has grand plans for Cass - it wishes him to be an ambassador for his people, and explains that the flame and his race have been manipulating events on Earth in order to better their chances of survival, manipulation that included the unfortunate suicide of Cass's wife. The flame proposes that Cass aid in introducing the flames to humankind. In exchange for a permanent home on earth - a zone of extreme heat - the flames will use their telepathic powers to assist mankind. Cass agonises over this offer for two days, and comes to the decision that humanity must stand or fall on its own merits, without outside help or control. He reactivates the flame and douses it violently with cold water. The rapid change in temperature kills the ancient being at once.

Cass, torn with regret and doubt, but set in his course of action, begins finding and killing the little flame creatures wherever he can find them. Posing as a journalist, he visits a foundry where locomotives are made and attempts to shut off the furnace. He is arrested and placed in a mental home.

Thos takes up the final part of the narrative, visiting Cass in the asylum. Cass claims to have been in contact with the flames once more, who have re-established contact with their brethren on the Sun. Cass tells the story of their race: how they became part of a "cosmical mind" reaching out to the creator of all things, and how this enterprise failed. Thos hears nothing from Cass for a few months, but is later informed of Cass's death - he perished in a fire at the asylum, which he started himself.

== Relation to Stapledon's other works ==
The Flames contains many elements familiar to readers of Stapledon's other books. The flame creatures themselves contribute to a "racial mind", or linked telepathic consciousness, something Stapledon's "Last Men" were shown to be capable of in Last and First Men and Last Men in London. The spiritual quest of a "cosmical mind", in which the flame creatures participated, is also the backbone to Stapledon's 1937 opus, Star Maker. (Whether it is the same quest is debatable - the endeavour of the cosmical mind in The Flames fails; in Star Maker it succeeds).

The alien beings are also treated as if they may be a symptom of mental illness, a device also used in Last Men in London.

== Critical reception ==
Emerging in late summer of 1947, critical reaction to The Flames was mixed. Several newspapers which had reviewed Stapledon's earlier works chose not to review The Flames. The book was given a somewhat lukewarm review by John Betjeman in the Daily Herald, who described the book as a "strain on the mind". However, a reviewer for the Daily Worker was enthusiastic, saying: "Contemporary literature's most ingenious master of macabre fantasy has excelled himself". Despite such reviews (and a promotional talk in Manchester by Stapledon himself), the book did not sell well.
