= Near future in fiction =

Popular chronological setting in cyberpunk and other science fiction genres

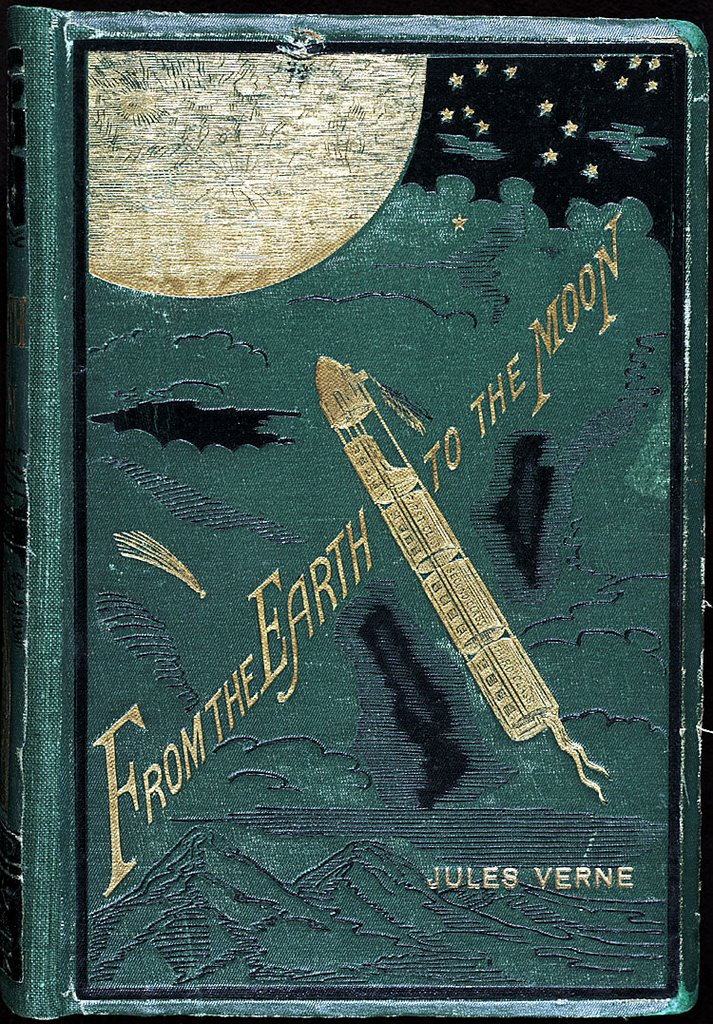
Cover of the Jules Verne's From the Earth to the Moon (1865), one of the earliest near future science fiction novels

The near future has been used as a setting in many works, usually but not limited to the genre of science fiction. It has become increasingly common in works from the 18th century onward, with some of the classic works in the genre being Jules Verne's Journey to the Centre of the Earth (1864) and H. G. Wells' The War of the Worlds (1898). The 20th century saw works such as George Orwell's Nineteen Eighty-Four (1949) or the novels of William Gibson, the latter representing the emergence of the popular cyberpunk genre. While some, particularly early, works of this genre are optimistic showcases of technological and societal progress, many others are discussing emergent social problems such as environmental problems, overpopulation, oppressive political regimes or the possibility of a nuclear holocaust.

== Themes ==
Unlike the works about the far future, set thousands or more years in the future and often tackling philosophical concepts such as the ultimate fate of the universe, fiction set in the near future, roughly defined as within the next few years or decades,^{α} has been described as more realistic and containing themes that have been described as more socially relevant. On the other hand, works set in the near future also carry the risk of quickly becoming obsolete due to trends or events that its authors failed to correctly predict. The entry in The Encyclopedia of Science Fiction concludes that "realistic speculative fiction about the near future is scarce and will undoubtedly remain so. Such fiction is too frightening to be popular", even among the fans of horror, who tend to prefer more supernatural and implausible scenarios; on the other hand, Gary Westfahl argued that the near future setting can make works more appealing to the readers, who may be turned away by tropes of classic science fiction such as space or time travel.

While works about the future are most often associated with the science fiction genre, the near future is also a setting of works of mainstream fiction or genre-defying works (such as techno-thrillers like military fiction by Tom Clancy, the 1979 James Bond movie Moonraker, or works of not science fiction, but political fiction, such Jack London's The Iron Heel from 1906, or the 1962 movie The Manchurian Candidate), as well as by the non-fiction works from the field of futures studies.

Early examples of futuristic fiction predate the modern science fiction genre, and include works such as The Reign of King George VI, 1900–1925 (1763) or Louis-Sébastien Mercier's Memoirs of the Year Two Thousand Five Hundred (1771). Once the science fiction genre started gaining in popularity, many of its works were set in the near future, beginning with the 19th-century classics such as Jane C. Loudon's The Mummy! (1827), Jules Verne's Journey to the Center of the Earth (1864) and H. G. Wells' The War of the Worlds (1898). Some early works in the genre have been criticized for being one-dimensional, like another classic work by H. G. Wells, The Invisible Man (1897), which forgoes discussion of wider societal impact of new technology (here, invisibility), instead focusing on a run-of-the-mill adventure, simply enhanced with the new gadget.

Initially most works set in the near future, described as scientific romance or utopias, were more optimistic, celebrating the expected advances in technological progress; an example of this trend is Jules Verne's Paris in the Twentieth Century (1863). More cautious and pessimistic works emerged as well, with the theme of the increasing dangers of warfare foreseeing the devastation of world wars, although some authors also speculated whether the next war would be, for better or worse, the final one (Wells himself coined the phrase the war to end war). Around the middle of the 20th century, pessimistic and cautious works started to become more common as more writers began to use the near future fiction as a way to discuss emergent social problems. Those works dealt with issues such as environmental degradation (J. G. Ballard's The Drowned World, 1962), overpopulation (John Brunner's Stand on Zanzibar, 1968), and oppressive political regimes (George Orwell's Nineteen Eighty-Four, 1949, Frederik Pohl and Cyril M. Kornbluth's The Space Merchants, 1952, or Philip K. Dick's Time Out of Joint, 1959). However, the same era saw some works returning to the earlier Golden Age traditions of the future as pristine and ordered, such as the animated series The Jetsons (1962).

A number of works outright predicted the human destruction through nuclear warfare, notably the classic movie Dr. Strangelove (1964). Some of those works can be described as satires or dystopian fiction and many belong to the New Wave science fiction. Other common tropes related to disaster fiction include comet and asteroid impact events (Larry Niven and Jerry Pournelle's Lucifer's Hammer, 1977), aforementioned environmental disasters, or more far-fetched alien invasion-scenarios (Wells' The War of the Worlds, Robert A. Heinlein's The Puppet Masters, 1951, Invasion of the Body Snatchers, 1956).

Late 20th century saw the rise of the cyberpunk genre, concerned with the new issues of the Computer Age, and newer works often deal with topics such as accelerating change, genetic engineering, artificial intelligence or nanotechnology. Notable examples of the near future genre in science fiction works from the turn of the last century include Frederik Pohl's The Years of the City (1984), Bruce Sterling's Islands in the Net (1988), numerous works of William Gibson, David Brin's Earth (1990) and Greg Bear's Queen of Angels (1990).

== Notes ==
^α Don D'Ammassa defined "near future in science fiction" as "an imprecise term used to identify novels set just far enough in the future to allow for certain technological or social changes without being so different that it is necessary to explain that society to the reader".

== See also ==
- Earth in science fiction
- Far future in fiction
- Future history
- List of films set in the future
- List of stories set in a future now in the past
