= Four Encounters =

Four Encounters is an unfinished work by the writer and philosopher Olaf Stapledon, written in the late 1940s but only published by Bran's Head Books in 1976, 26 years after the author's death. This edition contained an introduction by Brian Aldiss, a longtime champion of Stapledon's works. The text is also available in compilations of the author's writings.

The story is not science fiction, the discipline in which the author made his name. Rather it takes place in contemporary (post World War II) Britain, and describes four meetings with various characters who are named for the spiritual quality that best defines them: a Christian, a scientist, a mystic and a revolutionary.

The encounters take place in everyday scenarios — at parties, in a garage, etc. The narrator assesses all these various types according to his own association with, and understanding of, "The Spirit" — a theme familiar to readers of Stapledon from his discourses on the matter in his best-known works.

There were originally to have been ten encounters, but Stapledon died before the project was completed.
