= Nebula Maker =

1976 novel by Olaf Stapledon

- First edition
- Author: Olaf Stapledon
- Language: English
- Genre: Science fiction, Novel
- Publisher: Bran's Head
- Publication date: 1976
- Publication place: United Kingdom
- Media type: Print (Hardcover)
- Pages: 126

Nebula Maker is a science fiction novel by Olaf Stapledon and published posthumously by Bran's Head Books in 1976. It was written in the 1930s and discovered in 1976. It appears that this novel was written between his other books; Last and First Men in 1930, and Star Maker in 1937.

== History ==
Stapledon first announced his intention to write a history of the universe in his 1935 work Odd John, in which the main character, John Wainwright, has already produced such a work. (Stapledon would often mention his next literary project in the book in which he was currently engaged. The story of Odd John is, itself, encapsulated in passing in 1932's Last Men in London). Stapledon had by this time already completed the draft we now know as Nebula Maker, which he passed on to his friend, the novelist Naomi Mitchison, in the summer of 1933.

Mitchison offered her own criticisms of the manuscript; she found the God-figure too traditionally male, and was amused by Stapledon's myth-making, which jarred with his self-image as a man of practicality and pragmatism. Mitchison's criticism impressed Stapledon enough to send him back to the drawing-board, and the manuscript was duly shelved, to be found four years later in Stapledon's desk. Stapledon then began work on what would become Star Maker.

Nebula Maker was published as a work in its own right in 1976, by Bran's Head Books. It contained a foreword by Harvey Satty, then president of the Olaf Stapledon Society.

== Plot ==
Like Star Maker, Nebula Maker begins with a single human observer staring at the sky and considering the immensity of the cosmos. From that point, the stories diverge. The narrator immediately sees the face of the creator – an ever-shifting mask of constant change, human then alien, demonic then angelic. The narrator watches in wonder as this vision of God creates our universe.

The universe is peopled at first by the immense, bizarre lifeforms whose history takes up the rest of the manuscript – the nebulae. Singularly or in clusters, these vast entities come to consciousness and express their passions through a frenzied cosmic dance. Some, however become perverted and fanatical, and war breaks out in the heavens. It is discovered that nebulae can journey to other nebulae if they feed on the dead "flesh" of their fellows, and this development fuels aeons of conflict.

Two individual nebulae, Bright Heart and Fire Bolt, who embody the human types by which Stapledon was most, namely the saint and the revolutionary. Bright Heart preaches peace, and is martyred; Fire Bolt brings about revolution and changes the social order of the cosmos.

With Bright Heart dead, and Fire Bolt crumbling into senescence, the remaining nebulae attempt to bring about universal peace and harmony, but a quarrel over how to do this once again results in war. The history of the nebulae is thus one of tragedy, and as they dissolve into the stars and planets of our own cosmical time, the narrator wonders at the creator who could author such a complex dance of hope and futility.

== Relation to Star Maker ==
Stapledon retained some elements of the history of the nebulae for the penultimate chapters of Star Maker, though the material was greatly changed and the concept of inter-nebular war removed completely. The nebular creatures of Star Maker are still conscious, spiritual beings, but their tragedy is now one of disease rather than war; they accept that their fate is to decay into the stars and planets that will one day teem with smaller and more hectic life. They do not seem to have names.

== Relation to Stapledon's other works ==
Bright Heart is loosely based on Jesus Christ and Mahatma Gandhi. Fire Bolt is patterned after Lenin. Stapledon explored the more human elements of Nebula Maker, and these two personality types, in his non-fiction work Saints and Revolutionaries .
