= Sirius (novel) =

1944 novel by Olaf Stapledon

- First edition cover
- Author: Olaf Stapledon
- Language: English
- Genre: Science fiction
- Publisher: Secker & Warburg
- Publication date: 1944
- Publication place: United Kingdom
- Media type: Print (Hardcover & Paperback)
- Pages: 200

Sirius is a 1944 science fiction novel by the British philosopher and author Olaf Stapledon, whose title character is a dog named Sirius with humanlike intelligence. A sense of existential questioning suffuses the book, as the author delves into aspects of Sirius's psyche. The novel deals with many human issues through Sirius and his experiences, his unusual nature, his ideas and his relationships with humans. The characters go to great lengths to prevent Sirius from becoming a circus-type wonderdog, and instead, they seek to develop Sirius's character much like a family would create and foster that of a human child.

== Plot summary ==
In early 20th century North Wales, scientist Thomas Trelone embarks to hormonally enhance the cognition and lifespan of sheep-dogs, eventually succeeding in creating a viable puppy, Sirius, just as his daughter Plaxy is born. Sirius soon exceeds Thomas's expectations by achieving human intelligence and learning to talk, albeit with not easily recognizable speech. As such, Thomas and his wife Elizabeth raise Plaxy and Sirius as if they were siblings. Despite their love for each other, Plaxy and Sirius begin to grow apart when she joins a boarding school while he becomes the sheep-dog of Mr. Pugh, an acknowledgement of Thomas. Concerned for Sirius's well-being, Thomas conceals his intelligence from Mr. Pugh as well as the public. After a year, Sirius eagerly returns home to meet Plaxy again and discuss with Thomas his ambitions.

Partly to comply with his desires, Thomas decides to bring Sirius to the University of Cambridge and reveal him to his most trusted colleagues, who react with fascination. Sirius's time at Cambridge partly satisfies his mental pursuits, but his well-being, self-control, and fitness decline due to homesickness, self-indulgence, and inactivity. He manages to arrange a meeting with Plaxy, now a university student, but she fails to console him.

Disillusioned by the encounter, Sirius begins to assess humanity and nature cynically, alternating between love and hate towards Plaxy and sporadically rejecting his human side by embracing savagery. Yearning for something more fulfilling than science, Sirius experiences a spiritual epiphany and becomes interested in religion. However, when Elizabeth arranges a meeting with Reverend Geoffrey Adams, Sirius is disappointed to learn that human religion centers more on doctrine than love or spiritual truth. Nevertheless, after great persuasion to express himself, Geoffrey, with caution, allows Sirius to sing in his church in front of an astounded audience, becoming a local phenomenon.

Sirius returns home and resumes his occupation as a sheep-dog, just as World War II hits Britain. Geoffrey is killed and Sirius witnesses Thomas being crushed to death during a bombing, with Elizabeth succumbing shortly after to shock from believing to have lost her son in battle. With his masters and parental figures deceased, Sirius begins working with Plaxy at a farm, aided by the Pughs. Though the Pughs are now aware of Sirius's true nature and welcome it, the townspeople largely consider him an abomination and fabricate rumors of bestiality with Plaxy. The story's narrator, whose romantic interest is Plaxy, visits them. Although Plaxy accepts the narrator as a lover, her main priority is Sirius. The rumors compel authorities to conscript Plaxy to public service, leaving Sirius alone managing the farm.

Depressed and enraged by the townspeople's hostility, Sirius leaves the farm to live in the wild. After he attacks livestock and kills two farmers in self-defense, the authorities set out to hunt him down. News of the incidents compel Plaxy to return to the farm, planning to rescue Sirius and escape to Scotland. She eventually finds him and manages to reawaken his human mind by consoling him. Despite her efforts, Sirius laments his existence as an irreconcilable conflict between his human-like mind and canine instincts. Sirius is shot by a farmer and dies professing his love for Plaxy, stating their time together, despite all the hardship, was worthwhile.
