= Darkness and the Light =

1942 novel by Olaf Stapledon

- First edition
- Author: Olaf Stapledon
- Language: English
- Genre: Science fiction
- Publisher: Methuen
- Publication date: 1942
- Publication place: United Kingdom
- Media type: Print (Hardcover & Paperback)
- Pages: 181

Darkness and the Light (1942) is a science fiction novel by British writer Olaf Stapledon.

In this work written in 1941, during World War II, Stapledon projects two separate futures for humanity, depending not on the outcome of that particular conflict but on the failure or success of a future "Tibetan Renaissance" to influence the temper and ideology of the militaristic Russian and Chinese empires that threaten it. One of the futures involves worldwide Chinese imperialism and the subsequent degeneration and extinction of the human race, unable to defend itself against speedily evolving rats. The other ends in overthrowing the empires and creation of a worldwide socialist utopia.
