= Homo superior =

Science fiction term

Homo superior is a term used in speculative fiction and philosophy to describe a hypothetical evolutionary successor to Homo sapiens.

The expression was first popularised by the British writer Olaf Stapledon in his novel Odd John (1935), where it referred to a mutant child prodigy whose abilities marked him as a new species beyond ordinary humanity.

The idea is distinct from Friedrich Nietzsche’s concept of the Übermensch ("superman"), which was philosophical rather than biological, though the two are often compared.

The term has since appeared in popular culture, notably in Stan Lee's X-Men comic from 1963 on, the 1970s British television series The Tomorrow People and in David Bowie’s song "Oh! You Pretty Things" (1971).

== See also ==
- Posthuman
- Transhumanism
- Übermensch
