= John Gloag =

English author and soldier

John Gloag (10 August 1896 – 17 July 1981) was an English writer in the fields of furniture design and architecture, as well as science and speculative fiction. Gloag served with the Welsh Guards during the First World War, and was invalided home after suffering gas poisoning.

== Writings on design ==
Artifex, or the Future of Craftsmanship (1926), part of the To-day and To-morrow series, was a pamphlet by Gloag that discussed the relationship between artistic craftmanship and mass production.

Gloag's A Short Dictionary of Furniture (2nd ed. 1969) was a reference book covering the history and types of furniture from the tenth century to the 1960s.

== Novels ==
Gloag's first science fiction novel, Tomorrow's Yesterday, (1932) was inspired by the work of H. G. Wells and Gloag's friend Olaf Stapledon. Tomorrow's Yesterday is a satire that depicts a race of cat people from the distant future observing human society. In The New Pleasure (1933) a powder that greatly increases the sense of smell causes a social upheaval. Winter's Youth (1934) revolves around a longevity technology, which falls into the hands of a corrupt politician, with disastrous social consequences. In Manna (1940) a journalist discovers a plan to develop a fungus that could end world hunger. 99% (1944) is about an experiment to give humans access to their race memory.

Later in his career Gloag wrote historical fantasy novels; Caesar of the Narrow Seas (1969), The Eagles Depart (1973) and Artorius Rex (1977). Artorius Rex focuses on King Arthur and Sir Kay.

== Fiction publications ==
=== Novels ===
- Tomorrow's Yesterday (1932)
- The New Pleasure (1933)
- Winter's Youth (1934)
- Sweet Racket (1936)
- Ripe for Development (1936)
- Sacred Edifice (1937, revised 1954)
- Documents Marked Secret (1938)
- Unwilling Adventurer (1940)
- Manna (1940)
- I Want An Audience (1941)
- Mr. Buckby is Not at Home (1942)
- 99% (1944)
- In Camera (1945)
- Kind Uncle Buckby (1946)
- All England at Home (1949)
- Not in the Newspapers (1953)
- Slow (1954)
- Unlawful Justice (1962)
- Rising Suns (1964)
- Caesar of the Narrow Seas (1969)
- The Eagles Depart (1973)
- Artorius Rex (1977)

=== Short stories ===
- It Makes a Nice Change (1938)
- First One and Twenty (1946)
- Take One a Week: An Omnibus of Volume of 52 Short Stories (1950)

== Non-fiction publications ==
- Colour & Comfort in Decoration (1924) OL 1189719W
- Time, Taste and Furniture (1925; 3rd ed. 1949)
- Artifex, or the Future of Craftsmanship (1926) OL 1189705W
- Home Life in History: Social Life and Manners in Britain, 200 BC-AD 1926 (1927) co-authored with C. Thompson Walker
- Modern Home Furnishing (1929) from "Macmillan's Sixpenny Self-Help Library" series
- Men and Buildings (1931; 2nd revised ed. 1950)
- English Furniture (1934; 6th revised ed. 1973) from "The Library of English Art" series
- Industrial Art Explained (1934; revised & enlarged ed. 1946) OL 10417107W
- Design in Modern Life (1934) editor
- The American Nation: A Short History of the United States (1942; revised ed. 1955)
- The Place of Glass in Building (1943) editor
- The Englishman's Castle: A History of Houses, Large and Small, in Town and Country from AD 1000 to the Present Day (1944; 2nd revised ed. 1949) OL 10417106W
- The Missing Technician in Industrial Production (1944)
- Plastics and Industrial Design (1945)
- British Furniture Makers (1945) from the "Britain in Pictures" series
- Industrial Art Explained (1946)
- Self Training for Industrial Designers (1947)
- The English Tradition in Design (1947) from the "King Penguin" series
- A History of Cast Iron in Architecture (1948) co-authored with Derek Bridgwater
- How to Write Technical Books (1950)
- 2,000 Years of England (1952)
- A Short Dictionary of Furniture (1952; 2nd ed. 1969) OL 1189727W
  - revised and expanded as John Gloag's Dictionary of Furniture (1990)
- Georgian Grace: A Social History of Design 1660-1830 (1956) OL 1189725W
- Guide to Western Architecture (1958) OL 1189728W
- The English Tradition in Design (1959)
- Advertising in Modern Life (1959)
- Victorian Comfort: A Social History of Design from 1830-1900 (1961) OL 1189724W
- Victorian Taste: Some Social Aspects of Architecture and Industrial Design from 1820-1900 (1962)
- The English Tradition in Architecture (1963)
- Architecture (1963) from "The Arts of Man" series
- The Englishman's Chair: Origins, Design, and Social History of Seat Furniture in England (1964)
- Enjoying Architecture (1965) from the "Oriel Guide" series
- Mr Loudon's England: The Life and Work of John Claudius Loudon, and his Influence on Architecture and Furniture Design (1970)
- Guide to Furniture Styles: English and French, 1450 to 1850 (1972) ISBN 0713612673
- The Architectural Interpretation of History (1975) OL 1189718W
