= Murder Madness =

1931 novel by Murray Leinster

- Cover of the first edition
- Author: Murray Leinster
- Language: English
- Genre: Science fiction
- Publisher: Brewer and Warren
- Publication date: 1931
- Publication place: United States
- Media type: Print (Hardback)
- Pages: 298
- OCLC: 3853539

Murder Madness is a science fiction novel by American writer Murray Leinster. It was first published in book form in 1931 by Brewer and Warren. It was Leinster's first book. The novel was originally serialized in four parts in the magazine Astounding SF beginning in May 1930.

== Plot introduction ==
The novel concerns a tyrant who attempts to control civilization by using a madness-inducing drug.

== Sources ==
- Chalker, Jack L.; Mark Owings (1998). The Science-Fantasy Publishers: A Bibliographic History, 1923-1998. Westminster, MD and Baltimore: Mirage Press, Ltd. p. 270.
- Clute, John; Peter Nicholls (1995). The Encyclopedia of Science Fiction. New York: St. Martin's Griffin. p. 707. ISBN 0-312-13486-X.
- Tuck, Donald H. (1974). The Encyclopedia of Science Fiction and Fantasy. Chicago: Advent. p. 243. ISBN 0-911682-20-1.
