= The Hampdenshire Wonder =

1911 novel by J. D. Beresford

- First edition
- Author: J. D. Beresford
- Language: English
- Genre: Science fiction novel
- Publisher: Sidgwick & Jackson
- Publication date: 1911
- Publication place: United Kingdom
- Media type: Print (hardback & paperback)
- Pages: 295 pp

The Hampdenshire Wonder is a science fiction novel by J. D. Beresford, first published 1911. It is one of the first novels to involve a wunderkind (child prodigy). The child, Victor Stott, is the son of a famous cricket player. This origin is perhaps a reference to H. G. Wells's father Joseph Wells, a cricketer. The novel concerns his progress from infant to almost preternaturally clever child. Victor Stott is deformed subtly to allow for his powerful brain. A prominent, and unpleasant, character is the local minister. As Beresford's father was a minister, and Beresford was himself partially disabled, some see autobiographical aspects to the story. However this is unproven.

What is more definite is that the story of Christian Heinrich Heineken (1721–1725) was an inspiration for the story. Whether the biography of that child prodigy was accurate or not, "the Lubeck prodigy" is mentioned in the work. In the original version, the progressionist ideas of Henri Bergson concerning evolution were a significant influence.

== Reception and influence ==
Upon publication in 1911, The Hampdenshire Wonder was praised by George Bernard Shaw.

In 1971 Graham Greene wrote that "The Hampdenshire Wonder remains one of the finest and most neglected novels of this period between the great wars."

Olaf Stapledon also read The Hampdenshire Wonder; the novel influenced Stapledon's own novel of a superhuman, Odd John.

== Sources ==
- Bleiler, Everett (1948). The Checklist of Fantastic Literature. Chicago: Shasta Publishers. p. 48.
- George M. Johnson. J.D. Beresford. New York: Twayne/Simon and Schuster, 1998.
- George M. Johnson. "The Other Side of Edwardian Fiction: Two Forgotten Fantasy Novels of 1911" Wormwood: Literature of the fantastic, supernatural and decadent. U.K., No. 16 (Spring 2011) 3–15.
- George M. Johnson. "Evil is in the Eye of the Beholder: Threatening Children in Two Edwardian Speculative Satires". Science Fiction Studies. Vol. 41, No.1 (March 2014): 26–44.
