= Odd John =

1935 novel by Olaf Stapledon

- First edition cover
- Author: Olaf Stapledon
- Language: English
- Genre: Science fiction
- Published: 1935 (Methuen)
- Publication place: United Kingdom
- Media type: Print (hardback & paperback)

Odd John: A Story Between Jest and Earnest is a 1935 science fiction novel by the British author Olaf Stapledon. The novel explores the theme of the Übermensch (superman) in the character of John Wainwright, whose supernormal human mentality inevitably leads to conflict with normal human society and to the destruction of the utopian colony founded by John and other superhumans.

The novel alludes to J. D. Beresford's superhuman child character Victor Stott in The Hampdenshire Wonder (1911). As the devoted narrator remarks, John does not feel obliged to observe the restricted morality of Homo sapiens. Stapledon's recurrent vision of cosmic angst – that the universe may be indifferent to intelligence, no matter how spiritually refined – also gives the story added depth. Later explorations of the theme of the superhuman and of the incompatibility of the normal with the supernormal occur in the works of Stanisław Lem, Frank Herbert, Wilmar Shiras, Robert Heinlein and Vernor Vinge, among others.

The book is mentioned by Julian May in Intervention, part of the Galactic Milieu Series. It is also responsible for coining the term "homo superior".

== Protagonist ==
John is extremely intelligent even if he is stunted in his physical development. Like Stapledon himself, he believes in communist ideas but is critical of mainstream Marxism. He is also quite vain and highly skillful in the arts of seduction. From a human viewpoint, he can be considered amoral or perhaps to be following a morality beyond human understanding.

== Outline ==
1. John and Author. A physical description of John Wainwright.
2. The First Phase. His parents, and his life from birth (around 1910) to five years of age. At the age of four, he learns to speak; nine months later, he learns to count. He claims to learn all of mathematics, and develops an ability to visualise n-dimensional space.
3. Enfant Terrible. He learns to walk at the age of six, and practises acrobatics and fighting with a neighbourhood boy called Stephen. He studies biology and jujitsu.
4. John and his Elders. John's relationships with people around him. He is taken to see factories and mines, and waylays people of interest to interview them. The interview with "Mr Magnate".
5. Thought and Action. John occupies himself with toys, and studies philosophy. His burglaries, and his murder of Smithson.
6. Many Inventions. John's friendship with the six-year-old Judy. His secret laboratory and his inventions.
7. Financial Ventures. John uses the author as a go-between to sell the inventions. He speculates financially and is cheated. He tries to study directly with financiers.
8. Scandalous Adolescence. John has gay affairs, and courts a much older woman named Europa. After that, it is indirectly hinted that he copulated with his own mother.
9. Methods of a Young Anthropologist. John interviews famous people using various ruses. He travels to France, Germany, Italy and Scandinavia. He plays the part of a backward child while visiting a psychiatrist.
10. The World's Plight. John discusses current affairs with the narrator, and asserts that he has no interest in helping humanity.
11. Strange Encounters. John goes on "holiday" in Scotland, and the narrator hears bizarre reports from two climbers named McWhist and Norton.
12. John in the Wilderness. John returns and gives an account of his austerities and his spiritual experiences.
13. John Seeks his Kind. He develops telepathy, and uses it to discover two beings similar to himself: a musical madman named James Jones, and a crippled child in the Hebrides.
14. Engineering Problems. He conceives the idea of creating a colony of "supernormals", and builds a yacht and a plane.
15. Jacqueline. The story of a superhuman in Paris, who was born in 1765.
16. Adlan. The story of a superhuman in Egypt, born in 1512, who communicates with John 35 years after his own death.
17. Ng-Gunko and Lo. A 12-year-old Ethiopian boy and a 17-year-old Siberian girl join John.
18. The Skid's First Voyage. They travel to the South Pacific, picking up many colleagues on the way. On arrival they take over an island, massacring the original inhabitants.
19. The Colony is Founded. John and Lo briefly return to England.
20. The Colony in Being. The narrator travels to the island and describes the colony.
21. The Beginning of the End. The island is discovered by a British surveying vessel called the Viking. This is followed by a visit from two British light cruisers, a visit from the Soviets, and a final attempt at mass arrest by an international expedition. All are repelled with psionic attacks.
22. The End. Mercenaries invade the island, but are driven away with harsh psionic attacks. On 15 December 1933, the colonists deliberately destroy their own island.

== Adaptations ==
George Pal bought the rights to Odd John and in 1966 Castle of Frankenstein magazine reported that actor David McCallum would play the title role.

In 2023, Shift released a comic book adaptation, scripted by Chris Murray and illustrated by Nel Robinson.
