= Old Man in New World =

1944 short story by Olaf Stapledon

Cover of the first edition

"Old Man in New World" is a short story by British writer Olaf Stapledon, published as a separate volume by George Allen and Unwin in 1944. It was published through PEN, the international writers' association.

The story is set in the late 1990s, and tells of the world that has been rebuilt from the devastation of the Second World War, as seen through the eyes of an old revolutionary. The "Old Man" is invited to London to see "The Procession of The Peoples", an event celebrating the new order and the triumph of the human spirit.

In witnessing this event, however, the Old Man sees the seeds of the very things he, in his youth, fought against — falsehood, political will and religiosity.
