= Death into Life =

1946 novel by Olaf Stapledon

- First edition
- Author: Olaf Stapledon
- Publisher: Methuen
- Publication date: 1946
- Pages: 159
- OCLC: 3471284

Death into Life is a 1946 novel by British writer Olaf Stapledon. Not strictly science fiction (the genre into which Stapledon's works are usually classified), the novel is described as "an imaginative treatment of the problem of survival after death". It deals primarily with the soul of a rear gunner who is killed in World War II, and who finds himself surviving his apparent death—first as part of a spirit bomber-crew, then as part of the spirits who were killed in the battle, and so on until finally his soul becomes part of a 'cosmical spirit'.

The book was the second to last work of Stapledon's fiction to be published during the author's lifetime.

== Editions ==
- Olaf Stapledon, Morte nella vita, traduzione di Alessio Severo, Passerino Editore, 2024, ASIN B0D5TQ9JJ9; FdBooks, 2024, ASIN B0D7SSBL1R (edizioni ebook); FdBooks, 2024, ASIN B0D7SSBL1R (edizione cartacea)
