= Last and First Men =

1930 novel by Olaf Stapledon

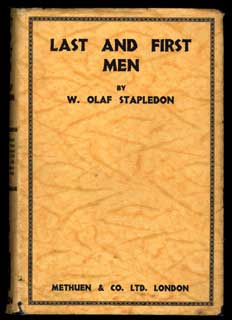
- First edition cover
- Author: Olaf Stapledon
- Language: English
- Genre: Science fiction; Future history; Speculative evolution
- Published: 23 October 1930 (Methuen)
- Publication place: United Kingdom
- Media type: Print (hardback & paperback)
- Pages: 336
- ISBN: 978-1-85798-806-2
- OCLC: 43880808

Last and First Men: A Story of the Near and Far Future is a "future history" science fiction novel by the British author Olaf Stapledon. It was first published on 23 October 1930 by Methuen. A work of unprecedented scale in the genre, it describes the history of humanity from the present for two billion years and eighteen human species, of which contemporary humans are the first. The book employs a narrative conceit that, under subtle inspiration, the novelist has unknowingly been dictated a channelled text from the last human species.

== Overview ==
Stapledon's conception of history follows a repetitive cycle with many civilisations rising from and descending back into savagery over millions of years, as the later civilisations rise to far greater heights than the first. The book anticipates the science of genetic engineering, and is an early example of the fictional supermind, a consciousness comprising many telepathically linked individuals.

Devastating European wars in the 21st century result in the United States and China being the last remaining superpowers. This leads to a Sino-American war which ends with the creation of a first World State. In the 26th century, individual religions go extinct. Human religions and secular science consolidate into the worship of the Aristotelian Prime Mover (Latin: primum movens). A few thousand years later, the depletion of Earth's fossil fuels causes a civilizational collapse.

In 1932, Stapledon followed Last and First Men with the more obscure and less acclaimed Last Men in London. Another work by Stapledon, called Star Maker (1937) could also be considered a sequel to Last and First Men. (It mentions man's evolution on Neptune.) Star Maker, while shorter, is even more ambitious in scope, describing among other topics, a history of the universe.

== Species of humans ==
- First Men. (Chapters 1–6) The First Men are the human species of the real-world modern day. Beginning in the early twenty-first century, several increasingly devastating wars take place in Europe, which result in the United States and China becoming the two dominant superpowers on Earth. In the twenty-fourth century, the US and China go to war, and the war concludes with the formation of the First World State. In the twenty-sixth century, all religions and secular science consolidate into a religion based on the worship of motion whose god is Gordelpus, the Prime Mover. Four millennia after the formation of the First World State, humans deplete Earth's supply of fossil fuels, resulting in the total collapse of civilization. 100,000 years later, a new civilisation emerges in Patagonia. One feature of the Patagonian civilization was a cult of youth. One day, a riot occurs at a mine, and the rioters inadvertently cause a colossal subterranean explosion, rendering most of the Earth's surface uninhabitable for millions of years save for the poles and the northern coast of Siberia. The only survivors of the disaster are thirty-five humans stationed at the North Pole, whose descendants eventually diverge into two species, the Second Men and some sub-humans. The First Men do not become extinct until shortly after the emergence of the Second Men.
- Second Men. (Chapters 7–9) The Second Men came into existence ten million years after the fall of the First Men. "Their heads, indeed, were large even for their bodies, and their necks massive. Their hands were huge, but finely moulded ... their legs were stouter ... their feet had lost their separate toes ... blonde hirsute appearance ... Their eyes were large, and often jade green, their features firm as carved granite, yet mobile and lucent. ... not till they were fifty did they reach maturity. At about 190 their powers began to fail ..." Unlike our species, egotism is virtually unknown to them. At the acme of their highly advanced civilization, just as they are about to create a superior human species through "artificial evolution", a protracted war with the Martians finally ends with the Martians extinct and the Second Men gone into eclipse.
- Third Men. (Chapter 10) "Scarcely more than half the stature of their predecessors, these beings were proportionally slight and lithe. Their skin was of a sunny brown, covered with a luminous halo of red-gold hairs ... golden eyes ... faces were compact as a cat's muzzle, their lips full, but subtle at the corners. Their ears, objects of personal pride and of sexual admiration, were extremely variable both in individuals and in races. ... But the most distinctive feature of the Third Men was their great lean hands, on which were six versatile fingers, six antennae of living steel." They were deeply interested in music (to the point of developing a religion based on the worship of music) and the design of living organisms. The Third Men eventually split into two factions: one that sought to create a subspecies of mediums, and one that focused on designing humans that consist almost entirely of brain tissue.
- Fourth Men. (Chapter 11) Giant brains bred by one faction of the Third Men. For a long time they help govern their creators, but eventually their rule becomes oppressive and the Third Men rebel. The Fourth Men prevail by recruiting as servants a subspecies of Third Men prone to hypnotic suggestion (the ultimate product of the effort to breed a mediumistic subspecies). The docile subspecies of the Third Men exterminate the original subspecies, save for a few individuals to be used as lab specimens. After the war, the Fourth Men eventually reach the limits of their scientific abilities and discover that emotions and body are also necessary for complete understanding of the cosmos.
- Fifth Men. (Chapters 11–12) An artificial human species designed by the Fourth Men. "On the average they were more than twice as tall as the First Men, and much taller than the Second Men ... the delicate sixth finger had been induced to divide its tip into two Lilliputian fingers and a corresponding thumb. The contours of the limbs were sharply visible, for the body bore no hair, save for a close, thick skull-cap which, in the original stock, was of ruddy brown. The well-marked eyebrows, when drawn down, shaded the sensitive eyes from the sun." After clashing with and finally eliminating the Third and Fourth Men, they develop a technology greater than Earth had ever known before. When Earth ceases to be habitable, they terraform Venus, committing genocide on its marine native race which tries to resist them. The Fifth Men do not cope well after the migration and eventually devolve and diverge into two species: the Sixth Men and a seal-like subhuman species.
- Sixth Men. (Chapter 13) "Sadly reduced in stature and in brain, these abject beings ... gained a precarious livelihood by grubbing roots upon the forest-clad islands, trapping the innumerable birds, and catching fish ... Not infrequently they devoured, or were devoured by, their seal-like relatives." After tectonic changes provide them with a promising land mass, they fluctuate like the First Men and repeat all their mistakes.
- Seventh Men. Flying humans, "scarcely heavier than the largest of terrestrial flying birds", are created by the Sixth Men. After 100 million years, a flightless pedestrian subspecies appears which re-develops technology.
- Eighth Men. "These long-headed and substantial folk were designed to be strictly pedestrian, physically and mentally." When Venus becomes uninhabitable, about to be destroyed along with the entire inner Solar System, they design the Ninth Men, who will live on Neptune.
- Ninth Men. (Chapter 14) "Inevitably it was a dwarf type, limited in size by the necessity of resisting an excessive gravitation ... too delicately organized to withstand the ferocity of natural forces on Neptune ... civilization crumbled into savagery." After the Ninth Men's civilization collapses, the Ninth Men themselves devolve into various animal species.
- Tenth to Thirteenth Men. (Chapter 14) "Nowhere did the typical human form survive." About three hundred million years after the colonization of Neptune, a rabbit-like species evolves into the Tenth Men. The Tenth Men are sapient but primitive. After a plague wipes out the Tenth Men, several other primitive human species rise and fall.
- Fourteenth to Seventeenth Men. The Fourteenth, Fifteenth, and Sixteenth Men are essentially Neptunian versions of the First, Second and Fifth Men, respectively. The Fourteenth Men create great civilisations and destroy them, frustrated with their own imperfections. The Fifteenth improve upon that, creating a spirituality based on "a devotion to the fulfilment of human capacity". They eventually create the Sixteenth Men – the first Neptunian artificial species. Thus the cycle of rise and collapse of civilisations ends, and steady progress takes its place. The Sixteenth Men achieve the highest level of civilisation possible "to the individual human brain acting in physical isolation" and to avoid stagnation create the Seventeenth Men, with an ability for "mental fusion of many individuals" to succeed them; however, the Seventeenth Men are "flawed" in some unspecified way, unimagined by the 16th due to their lesser awareness, and last only a short period of time before being replaced by the Eighteenth Men.
- Eighteenth Men. (Chapters 15–16) The most advanced humans of all, essentially a perfected version of the 17th species. A race of philosophers and artists with a very liberal sexual morality. "Superficially we seem to be not one species but many." One interesting aspect of the Eighteenth Men is that they have a number of different "sub-genders", variants on the basic male and female pattern, with distinctive temperaments. The Eighteenth Men's equivalent of the family unit includes one of each of these sub-genders and is the basis of their society. The units have the ability to act as a group mind, which eventually leads to the establishment of a single group mind uniting the entire species. The Eighteenth Men have achieved a form of immortality; individuals no longer die naturally through age or illness, but only by accident, suicide, or being killed. Despite their hyper-advanced civilisation, they practice ritual cannibalism. They are eventually extinguished on Neptune after a supernova consumes the remains of the Solar System, faster than any means of escape they can devise for their corporeal forms. This last species of man devises a method of panspermia, a virus to broadcast life to other worlds and ultimately cause the evolution of new sentient species throughout the galaxy.

=== Sub-humans ===
- Baboon-like Submen. (Chapter 7) "Bent so that as often as not they used their arms as aids to locomotion, flat-headed and curiously long-snouted, these creatures were by now more baboon-like than human".
- Seal-like Submen. (Chapter 13) "The whole body was moulded to stream-lines. The lung capacity was greatly developed. The spine had elongated, and increased in flexibility. The legs were shrunken, grown together, and flattened into a horizontal rudder. The arms also were diminutive and fin-like, though they still retained the manipulative forefinger and thumb. The head had shrunk into the body and looked forward in the direction of swimming. Strong carnivorous teeth, emphatic gregariousness, and a new, almost human, cunning in the chase, combined to make these seal-men lords of the ocean".
- Period of Eclipse. (Chapter 14) "Man's consciousness was narrowed and coarsened into brute-consciousness. By good luck the brute precariously survived." Nature succeeds in colonising Neptune where sapient life fails. Human-derived mammals of all shapes come to dominate Neptune's ecosystem before adapting well enough for the vestiges of opposable thumbs and intelligence to become assets again.

== Reception ==
Wendy Graham reviewed Last and First Men for Adventurer magazine and stated that "I found the story was very gloomy on the whole. We all know that there is much wrong with mankind at present, but there is much about us which gives rise to cautious optimism as well, and Stapledon seems to be overly enamoured of the romantic view that suicide is a noble gesture, both individually and racially at times."

== In popular culture ==
Characters discuss the novel in H. G. Wells' Star Begotten.

The novel appears in the computer game Deus Ex as a reference when a corporation in the game allegedly tries to develop the Second Men in the series. In a broader aspect as the game deals with genetic engineering, the next phase of evolution and human augmentations. Also similar to the book are the options presented to the player as to where human kind will go next: a fall back into an almost savage state of humanity, a keeping of the status quo or an extreme progression with the danger of sacrificing basic rights.

== Film adaptation ==
Icelandic composer Jóhann Jóhannsson directed and scored a multimedia Last and First Men, "combining a film narrated by actress Tilda Swinton and accompanying score played by the BBC Philharmonic" at the 2017 Manchester International Festival. The 16 mm black-and-white film is predominantly of memorial sculptures erected in the former SFR Yugoslavia. Jóhann collaborated with José Enrique Macián on writing the narration adapted from Stapledon's novel. This was next performed at the Barbican Centre, London in December 2018, and later at Sydney Opera House as part of the Vivid Festival, on 2 June 2019. In 2020, a film of this work was released as Jóhann's debut and final directorial work, with sound artist Yair Elazar Glotman completing the work after Jóhann's death in February 2018. The film premiered at the 70th Berlin International Film Festival, and later screened at other film festivals around the world and released on VOD.

== Influences on other writers ==
Brian Aldiss, in his preface to the 1962 edition, acknowledges the deep impression on him—and considerable influence on his own later writing—of Stapledon's book, which he encountered in 1943 while a British soldier fighting the Japanese in Burma, "An appropriately unusual period of life at which to encounter a vision so far outside ordinary experience."

Aldiss also mentions James Blish as another writer deeply influenced by Stapledon.

C. S. Lewis, in his own preface to That Hideous Strength, notes: "I believe that one of the central ideas of this tale came into my head from conversations I had with a scientific colleague, some time before I met a rather similar suggestion in the works of Mr. Olaf Stapledon. If I am mistaken in this, Mr. Stapledon is so rich in invention that he can afford to lend, and I admire his invention (though not his philosophy) so much that I should feel no shame to borrow."

The reference to objecting to Stapledon's philosophy was no accident. In particular, Lewis objected to Stapledon's idea, as expressed in the present book, that mankind could escape from an outworn planet and establish itself on another one; this Lewis regarded as no less than a Satanic idea –especially, but not only, because it necessitated the genocide of the original inhabitants of the target planet. Professor Weston, the chief villain of Lewis's Space Trilogy, is an outspoken proponent of this idea (much to his grief, however), and in Out of the Silent Planet, Lewis opposes to it his depiction of the virtuous and stoic Martians/Malacandrians who, even though they possess the technology to cross space and colonize Earth, choose to die with their dying planet.

Arthur C. Clarke has said of Stapledon's 1930 book Last and First Men that "No other book had a greater influence on my life ... [It] and its successor Star Maker (1937) are the twin summits of [Stapledon's] literary career."

H. P. Lovecraft held the book in very high regard (though he did not say whether it influenced any of his own stories), saying in a 1936 letter to Fritz Leiber "no one ought to miss reading W. Olaf Stapledon's Last and First Men ... Probably you have read it. If not, make a bee line for library or bookstall!", and in another 1936 letter to Leiber "I'm glad to hear of your perusal of Last and First Men—a volume which to my mind forms the greatest of all achievements in the field that Master Ackerman would denominate 'scientifiction'. Its scope is dizzying—and despite a somewhat disproportionate acceleration of the tempo toward the end, and a few scientific inferences which might legitimately be challenged, it remains a thing of unparalleled power. As you say, it has the truly basic quality of a myth, and some of the episodes are of matchless poignancy and dramatic intensity." Finally, in a 1937 letter to Arthur Widner he said "I don't care for science fiction of the sort published in cheap magazines. There's no vitality in it—merely dry theories tacked on to shallow, unreal, insincere juvenile adventure stories. But I do like the few real masterpieces in the field—certain of H. G. Wells's novels, S. Fowler Wright's The World Below, & that marvellous piece of imagination by W. Olaf Stapledon, Last & First Men." Edward Guimont and Horace Smith have argued that Last and First Men served as an influence for Lovecraft's one explicitly space opera story, "In the Walls of Eryx" (1936).

John Maynard Smith has said "A man called Olaf Stapledon was a marvellous predictor who wrote science fiction books that I read when I was 16 and that completely blew my mind; and Arthur C. Clarke put his finger on quite a number of bright thoughts. He and I have something in common: we both took out of the public library the same science fiction book when we were boys of about 15 or 16, which was Stapledon's Last and First Men. We took it out of the same country library in Porlock in Somerset. Whoever put that book on the shelves had a lot to answer for!"

Sir Patrick Moore has said "The science fiction novel Last and First Men by Olaf Stapledon is immensely thought-provoking and I've read it time and time again."

== See also ==
- Man After Man (1990) by Dougal Dixon—a more recent book based on the same premise
- All Tomorrows (2008) by C. M. Kosemen—another more recent book based on the same premise
- 1930 in science fiction
- Cannibalism in popular culture
- Far future in fiction
