= Last Men in London =

1932 novel by Olaf Stapledon

- First edition
- Author: Olaf Stapledon
- Language: English
- Genre: Science fiction
- Published: 1932 (Methuen Publishing)
- Publication place: United Kingdom
- Media type: Print (Hardcover & Paperback)

Last Men in London (1932) is a science fiction novel by British writer Olaf Stapledon.

== Plot ==
The narrator is the same member of the eighteenth and final human species who purportedly induced Stapledon to write Last and First Men. Last Men in London is the story of this being's exploration of the consciousness of a present-day Englishman named Paul, from childhood through service with an ambulance crew in the First World War (mirroring Stapledon's own personal history) to adult life as a schoolteacher faced with a "submerged superman" in his class, nicknamed Humpty. The inadequacies of Paul's character, the various dilemmas he has to face during his life, and the occasional influence of the advanced being who shares his experiences, provide Stapledon with a semi-autobiographical platform on which to expound his philosophical and moral beliefs.

The book includes a piece of satire on sexual morality. An unspecified future human species (one of the Eighteenth Men's predecessors on planet Neptune) is presented as having an attitude to nutrition analogous to the First Men's sexual puritanism. Hence they invent mouth aprons and food privies, while having sex in public.
