= Olaf Stapledon =

English novelist and philosopher (1886–1950)

- Stapledon
- Born: William Olaf Stapledon; 10 May 1886; Seacombe, Wallasey, Cheshire, England
- Died: 6 September 1950 (aged 64); Caldy, Cheshire, England
- Occupations: Novelist, philosopher
- Writing career
- Genres: Science fiction, philosophy
- Notable works: Last and First Men (1930), Odd John (1935), Star Maker (1937), Sirius (1944)

William Olaf Stapledon (10 May 1886 – 6 September 1950) was an English philosopher and author of science fiction. In 2014, he was inducted into the Science Fiction and Fantasy Hall of Fame.

Stapledon was born in Cheshire, but he lived in Port Said, Egypt throughout his early childhood. Following his college studies, he worked in shipping offices in Liverpool and Port Said from 1910 to 1912. During the First World War, he served as a conscientious objector. Stapledon became an ambulance driver with the Friends' Ambulance Unit in France and Belgium from July 1915 to January 1919; he was awarded the Croix de Guerre for bravery. His wartime experiences influenced his pacifist beliefs. Stapledon was awarded a PhD degree in philosophy from the University of Liverpool in 1925 and used his doctoral thesis as the basis for his first published prose book, A Modern Theory of Ethics (1929). However, he soon turned to fiction in the hope of presenting his ideas to a wider public.

Ideas such as a supermind composed of many individual consciousnesses form a recurring theme in his work. Star Maker (1937) contains the first known description of what are now called Dyson spheres. Freeman Dyson credits the novel with giving him the idea, even stating in an interview that "Stapledon sphere" would be a more appropriate name. Last and First Men (1930) features early descriptions of genetic engineering and terraforming. Sirius (1944) describes a dog whose intelligence is increased to the level of a human being's. Stapledon's work also refers to then-contemporary intellectual fashions (e.g. the belief in extrasensory perception). Stapledon is sometimes considered an intellectual forerunner of the contemporary transhumanist movement.

== Life ==
Stapledon was born in Seacombe, Wallasey, on the Wirral Peninsula in Cheshire, the only son of William Clibbett Stapledon and Emmeline Miller. The first six years of his life were spent with his parents at Port Said, Egypt. He was educated at Abbotsholme School in Derbyshire and Balliol College, Oxford, where he acquired a BA degree in Modern History (Second Class) in 1909, promoted to an MA (Oxon) in 1913. After a brief stint as a teacher at Manchester Grammar School he worked in shipping offices in Liverpool and Port Said from 1910 to 1912. From 1912 to 1915 Stapledon worked with the Liverpool branch of the Workers' Educational Association.

During the First World War he served as a conscientious objector. Stapledon became an ambulance driver with the Friends' Ambulance Unit in France and Belgium from July 1915 to January 1919; he was awarded the Croix de Guerre for bravery. His wartime experiences influenced his pacifist beliefs and advocacy of a World Government. On 16 July 1919 he married Agnes Zena Miller (1894–1984), an Australian cousin. They had first met in 1903, and later maintained a correspondence throughout the war. They had a daughter, Mary Sydney Stapledon (1920–2008), and a son, John David Stapledon (1923–2014). In 1920 they moved to West Kirby on the Wirral.

Stapledon was awarded a PhD degree in philosophy from the University of Liverpool in 1925 and used his doctoral thesis as the basis for his first published prose book, A Modern Theory of Ethics (1929). However, he soon turned to fiction in the hope of presenting his ideas to a wider public. The relative success of Last and First Men (1930) prompted him to become a full-time writer. He wrote a sequel, Last Men in London, and followed it up with many more books of both fiction and philosophy. Stapledon was a member of the Aristotelian Society.

As a pacifist Stapledon was involved in a number of peace-advocacy organisations, such as the Peace Pledge Union. In August 1939 he addressed a meeting of the Women's International League for Peace and Freedom. For the duration of the Second World War Stapledon abandoned his pacifism and supported the war effort. In 1940 the Stapledon family built and moved into a new house nearby, on Simon's Field in Caldy. During the war Stapledon became a public advocate of J.B. Priestley and Richard Acland's left-wing Common Wealth Party, as well as the British internationalist group Federal Union. He supported implementing the recommendations of the Beveridge Report and spoke at the first public meeting of the Left Book Club's "Readers' and Writers' Group".

Other organizations which Stapledon was involved with include the H.G. Wells Society, League of Nations Union, the 1941 Committee, the Progressive League and the British Interplanetary Society.

Some commentators have called Stapledon a Marxist, although Stapledon distanced himself from the label stating that "I am not a Marxist, but I have learned much from Marxists, and I am not anti-Marxist", though he did refer to himself as a socialist. He held membership of the Merseyside branch of the Fabian Society.

After 1945 Stapledon travelled widely on lecture tours. Arthur C. Clarke, as Chairman of the British Interplanetary Society, invited him to give a talk on the social and biological aspects of space exploration. He also travelled internationally, visiting the Netherlands, Sweden and France, and in 1948 he spoke at the World Congress of Intellectuals for Peace in Wrocław, Poland. He attended the Conference for World Peace held in New York City in 1949, the only Briton to be granted a visa to do so. In 1950 he became involved with the anti-apartheid movement. After a week of lectures in Paris, he cancelled a projected trip to Yugoslavia and returned to his home in Caldy, where he died very suddenly of a heart attack.

Stapledon was cremated at Landican Crematorium. His widow and their children scattered his ashes on the sandy cliffs overlooking the Dee Estuary, a favourite spot of his that features in many of his books. Stapledon Wood, on the south-east side of Caldy Hill, is named after him.

== Works ==
Stapledon's fiction often presents the strivings of some intelligence that is beaten down by an indifferent universe and its inhabitants who, through no fault of their own, fail to comprehend its lofty yearnings. It is filled with protagonists who are tormented by the conflict between their "higher" and "lower" impulses.

Stapledon's writings directly influenced Arthur C. Clarke, Brian Aldiss, Stanisław Lem, Bertrand Russell, John Gloag, Naomi Mitchison, C. S. Lewis, Vernor Vinge, John Maynard Smith and indirectly influenced many others, contributing many ideas to the world of science fiction. Clarke wrote:

In 1930 I came under the spell of a considerably more literate influence, when I discovered W. Olaf Stapledon's just-published Last and First Men in the Minehead Public Library. No book before or since ever had such and impact on my imagination; the Stapledonian vistas of millions and hundreds of millions of years, the rise and fall of civilizations and entire races of men, changed my whole outlook on the universe and has influenced much of my writing ever since.

Ideas such as a supermind composed of many individual consciousnesses forms a recurring theme in his work. Star Maker contains the first known description of what are now called Dyson spheres. Freeman Dyson credits the novel with giving him the idea, even stating in an interview that "Stapledon sphere" would be a more appropriate name. Last and First Men features early descriptions of genetic engineering and terraforming. Sirius describes a dog whose intelligence is increased to the level of a human being's. Stapledon's work also refers to then-contemporary intellectual fashions (e.g. the belief in extrasensory perception).

Last and First Men, a "future history" of 18 successive species of humanity, and Star Maker, an outline history of the Universe, were highly acclaimed by figures as diverse as Jorge Luis Borges, J. B. Priestley, Bertrand Russell, Algernon Blackwood, Hugh Walpole, Arnold Bennett, Virginia Woolf (Stapledon maintained a correspondence with Woolf) and Winston Churchill. In contrast, Stapledon's philosophy repelled C. S. Lewis, whose Cosmic Trilogy was written partly in response to what Lewis saw as amorality, although Lewis admired Stapledon's inventiveness and described him as "a corking good writer". In fact Stapledon was an agnostic who was hostile to religious institutions, but not to religious yearnings, a fact that set him at odds with H. G. Wells in their correspondence.

Together with his philosophy lectureship at the University of Liverpool, which now houses the Olaf Stapledon archive, Stapledon lectured in English literature, industrial history and psychology. He wrote many non-fiction books on political and ethical subjects, in which he advocated the growth of "spiritual values", which he defined as those values expressive of a yearning for greater awareness of the self in a larger context ("personality-in-community"). Stapledon himself named his spiritual values as intelligence, love and creative action. His philosophy was strongly influenced by Spinoza.

Among some members of the contemporary transhumanist movement, Stapledon is sometimes seen as an ideological predecessor, with certain aspects of his philosophy and storytelling viewed as early examples of transhumanist ideals.

== Film rights ==
Film producer and director George Pal bought the rights to Odd John and in 1966 Castle of Frankenstein magazine reported that David McCallum would play the title role.

In 2017 a multimedia adaptation of Last and First Men by Oscar-nominated Icelandic composer Jóhann Jóhannsson was released, featuring narration by Tilda Swinton and a live score performed by the BBC Philharmonic.

In 2019, Justin McDonald and Kate Hodgson wrote, produced, and starred in a short film adaptation of Stapledon's "A Modern Magician." Directed by Mark Heller, the film also featured the voice of Brian Cox. It was the first-ever live-action adaptation of any of Stapledon's literary works.

== Bibliography ==
=== Fiction ===
- Last and First Men: A Story of the Near and Far Future (1930) (ISBN 1-85798-806-X)
- Last Men in London (1932) (ISBN 0-417-02750-8)
- Odd John: A Story Between Jest and Earnest (1935) (ISBN 0-413-32900-3)
- Star Maker (1937) (ISBN 0-8195-6692-6) First Edition cover by Bip Pares
- Darkness and the Light (1942) (ISBN 0-88355-121-7)
- Old Man in New World (short story, 1944)
- Sirius: A Fantasy of Love and Discord (1944) (ISBN 0-575-07057-9)
- Death into Life (1946)
- The Flames: A Fantasy (1947)
- A Man Divided (1950) (ISBN 0-19-503087-7)
- Four Encounters (1976) (ISBN 0-905220-01-3)
- Nebula Maker (drafts of Star Maker, 1976) (ISBN 0-905220-06-4)
- East is West (posthumous, 1979)

=== Non-fiction ===
- A Modern Theory of Ethics: A study of the Relations of Ethics and Psychology (1929)
- Waking World (1934)
- Saints and Revolutionaries (1939)
- New Hope for Britain (1939)
- Philosophy and Living, 2 volumes (1939)
- Beyond the "Isms" (1942)
- Seven Pillars of Peace (1944)
- Youth and Tomorrow (1946)
- Interplanetary Man? (1948)
- The Opening of the Eyes (ed. Agnes Z. Stapledon, 1954)

=== Poetry ===
- Latter-Day Psalms (1914)

=== Collections ===
- Worlds of Wonder: Three Tales of Fantasy (1949)
- To the End of Time: the Best of Olaf Stapledon (ed. Basil Davenport, 1953) (ISBN 0-8398-2312-6)
- Far Future Calling: Uncollected Science Fiction and Fantasies of Olaf Stapledon (ed. Sam Moskowitz 1979 ISBN 1-880418-06-1)
- An Olaf Stapledon Reader (ed. Robert Crossley, 1997)

== See also ==
- List of peace activists
- List of ambulance drivers during World War I
