= Light-front quantization applications =

Quantization procedure in quantum field theory

The light cone of special relativity. Light-front quantization uses light-front (or light-cone) coordinates to select an initial surface that is tangential to the light cone. Equal-time quantization uses an initial surface that is horizontal, labeled here as the "hypersurface of the present".

The light-front quantization of quantum field theories provides a useful alternative to ordinary equal-time quantization. In particular, it can lead to a relativistic description of bound systems in terms of quantum-mechanical wave functions. The quantization is based on the choice of light-front coordinates, where $x^+\equiv ct+z$ plays the role of time and the corresponding spatial coordinate is $x^-\equiv ct-z$. Here, $t$ is the ordinary time, $z$ is a Cartesian coordinate, and $c$ is the speed of light. The other two Cartesian coordinates, $x$ and $y$, are untouched and often called transverse or perpendicular, denoted by symbols of the type $\vec x_\perp = (x,y)$. The choice of the frame of reference where the time $t$ and $z$-axis are defined can be left unspecified in an exactly soluble relativistic theory, but in practical calculations some choices may be more suitable than others. The basic formalism is discussed elsewhere.

There are many applications of this technique, some of which are discussed below. Essentially, the analysis of any relativistic quantum system can benefit from the use of light-front coordinates and the associated quantization of the theory that governs the system.

== Nuclear reactions ==
The light-front technique was brought into nuclear physics by the pioneering papers of Frankfurt and Strikman. The emphasis was on using the correct kinematic variables (and the corresponding simplifications achieved) in making correct treatments of high-energy nuclear reactions. This sub-section focuses on only a few examples.

Calculations of deep inelastic scattering from nuclei require knowledge of nucleon distribution functions within the nucleus. These functions give the probability that a nucleon of momentum $p$ carries a given fraction $y$ of the plus component of the nuclear momentum, $P$, $y=p^+/P^+$.

Nuclear wave functions have been best determined using the equal-time framework. It therefore seems reasonable to see if one could re-calculate nuclear wave functions using the light front formalism. There are several basic nuclear structure problems which must be handled to establish that any given method works. It is necessary to compute the deuteron wave function, solve mean-field theory (basic nuclear shell model) for infinite nuclear matter and for finite-sized nuclei, and improve the mean-field theory by including the effects of nucleon-nucleon correlations. Much of nuclear physics is based on rotational invariance, but manifest rotational invariance is lost in the light front treatment. Thus recovering rotational invariance is very important for nuclear applications.

The simplest version of each problem has been handled. A light-front treatment of the deuteron was accomplished by Cooke and Miller, which stressed recovering rotational invariance. Mean-field theory for finite nuclei was handled Blunden et al. Infinite nuclear matter was handled within mean-field theory and also including correlations. Applications to deep inelastic scattering were made by Miller and Smith. The principal physics conclusion is that the EMC effect (nuclear modification of quark distribution functions) cannot be explained within the framework of conventional nuclear physics. Quark effects are needed. Most of these developments are discussed in a review by Miller.

There is a new appreciation that initial and final-state interaction physics, which is not intrinsic to the hadron or nuclear light-front wave functions, must be addressed in order to understand phenomena such as single-spin asymmetries, diffractive processes, and nuclear shadowing. This motivates extending LFQCD to the theory of reactions and to investigate high-energy collisions of hadrons. Standard scattering theory in Hamiltonian frameworks can provide valuable guidance for developing a LFQCD-based analysis of high-energy reactions.

== Exclusive processes ==
One of the most important areas of application of the light-front formalism are exclusive hadronic processes. "Exclusive processes" are scattering reactions in which the kinematics of the initial state and final state particles are measured and thus completely specified; this is in contrast to "inclusive" reactions where one or more particles in the final state are not directly observed. Prime examples are the elastic and inelastic form factors measured in the exclusive lepton-hadron scattering processes such as $e p \to e^\prime p^\prime.$ In inelastic exclusive processes, the initial and final hadrons can be different, such as $e p \to e^\prime \Delta^+$. Other examples of exclusive reactions are Compton scattering $\gamma p \to \gamma^\prime p^\prime$, pion photoproduction $\gamma p \to \pi^+ n$ and elastic hadron scattering such as $\pi^+ p \to {\pi^+}^\prime p^\prime$. "Hard exclusive processes" refer to reactions in which at least one hadron scatters to large angles with a significant change in its transverse momentum.

Exclusive processes provide a window into the bound-state structure of hadrons in QCD as well as the fundamental processes which control hadron dynamics at the amplitude level. The natural calculus for describing the bound-state structure of relativistic composite systems, needed for describing exclusive amplitudes, is the light-front Fock expansion which encodes the multi-quark, gluonic, and color correlations of a hadron in terms of frame-independent wave functions. In hard exclusive processes, in which hadrons receive a large momentum transfer, perturbative QCD leads to factorization theorems which separate the physics of hadronic bound-state structure from that of the relevant quark and gluonic hard-scattering reactions which underlie these reactions. At leading twist, the bound-state physics is encoded in terms of universal "distribution amplitudes", the fundamental theoretical quantities which describe the valence quark substructure of hadrons as well as nuclei. Nonperturbative methods, such as AdS/QCD, Bethe–Salpeter methods, discretized light-cone quantization, and transverse lattice methods, are now providing nonperturbative predictions for the pion distribution amplitude. A basic feature of the gauge theory formalism is color transparency", the absence of initial and final-state interactions of rapidly moving compact color-singlet states. Other applications of the exclusive factorization analysis include semileptonic $B$ meson decays and deeply virtual Compton scattering, as well as dynamical higher-twist effects in inclusive reactions. Exclusive processes place important constraints on the light-front wave functions of hadrons in terms of their quark and gluon degrees of freedom as well as the composition of nuclei in terms of their nucleon and mesonic degrees of freedom.

The form factors measured in the exclusive reaction $e H \to e H^\prime$ encode the deviations from unity of the scattering amplitude due to the hadron's compositeness. Hadronic form factors fall monotonically with spacelike momentum transfer, since the amplitude for the hadron to remain intact continually decreases. One can also distinguish experimentally whether the spin orientation (helicity) of a hadron such as the spin-1/2 proton changes during the scattering or remains the same, as in the Pauli (spin-flip) and Dirac (spin-conserving) form factors.

The electromagnetic form factors of hadrons are given by matrix elements of the electromagnetic current such as $F_H(q^2) = <H^\prime ( p+q )|j^+| H (p) >$ where $q^\mu$ is the momentum four-vector of the exchanged virtual photon and $|H(p) >$ is the eigenstate for hadron $H$ with four momentum $p^\mu$. It is convenient to choose the light-front frame where $q^+=0, q_\perp =Q, q^- = \frac{2q \cdot p}{P^+}$ with $q^2_\perp = Q^2 = - q^2.$ The elastic and inelastic form factors can then be expressed as integrated overlaps of the light-front Fock eigenstate wave functions $\Psi_H(x_i, \vec k_\perp, \lambda_i)$ and $\Psi_H(x_i, \vec k^\prime_\perp, \lambda_i)$ of the initial and final-state hadrons, respectively. The $x$ of the struck quark is unchanged, and $k_\perp^\prime = \vec k_\perp + (1-x_i) \vec q_\perp$. The unstruck (spectator) quarks have $\vec k_\perp^\prime = \vec k_\perp - x_1 \vec q_\perp$. The result of the convolution gives the form factor exactly for all momentum transfer when one sums over all Fock states of the hadron. The frame choice $q^+=0$ is chosen since it eliminates off-diagonal contributions where the number of initial and final state particles differ; it was originally discovered by Drell and Yan and by West. The rigorous formulation in terms of light-front wave functions is given by Brodsky and Drell.

Light-front wave functions are frame-independent, in contrast to ordinary instant form wave functions which need to be boosted from $p$ to $p+q$, a difficult dynamical problem, as emphasized by Dirac. Worse, one must include contributions to the current matrix element where the external photon interacts with connected currents arising from vacuum fluctuations in order to obtain the correct frame-independent result. Such vacuum contributions do not arise in the light-front formalism, because all physical lines have positive $k^+$; the vacuum has only $k^+=0$, and $+$ momentum is conserved.

At large momentum transfers, the elastic helicity-conserving form factors fall-off as the nominal power $F_H(Q^2) \propto \left(\frac{1}{Q^2 }\right)^{n-1}$ where $n$ is the minimum number of constituents. For example, $n=3$ for the three-quark Fock state of the proton. This "quark counting rule" or "dimensional counting rule" holds for theories such as QCD in which the interactions in the Lagrangian are scale invariant (conformal). This result is a consequence of the fact that form factors at large momentum transfer are controlled by the short distance behavior of the hadron's wave function which in turn is controlled by the "twist" (dimension - spin) of the leading interpolating operator which can create the hadron at zero separation of the constituents. The rule can be generalized to give the power-law fall-off of inelastic form factors and form factors in which the hadron spin changes between the initial and final states. It can be derived nonperturbatively using gauge/string theory duality and with logarithmic corrections from perturbative QCD.

In the case of elastic scattering amplitudes, such as $K^+ p \to K^+p$, the dominant physical mechanism at large momentum transfer is the exchange of the $u$ quark between the $K^+(u \bar s)$ kaon and the proton $(uud)$. This amplitude can be written as a convolution of the four initial and final state light-front valence Fock-state wave functions. It is convenient to express the amplitude in terms of Mandelstam variables, where, for a reaction $A+ B \to C + D$ with momenta $P_X$, the variables are $s= (P_A+ P_B)^2 = E_{CM}^2, t = (P_D+ P_B)^2, u = (P_A-P_D)^2$. The resulting "quark interchange" amplitude has the leading form $M \propto \frac{1}{u t^2}$ which agrees well with the angular dependence and power law fall-off of the amplitude with momentum transfer $p^2_T =\frac{ tu}{s}$ at fixed CM angle $\cos \theta_{CM} =\frac{ t-u }{ 2 s}$. The $\frac{1}{u}$ behavior of the amplitude, at fixed but large momentum transfer squared $t$, shows that the intercept of Regge amplitudes $u^\alpha(t) \to -1$ at large negative $t$. The nominal power-law $s^{-8}$ fall-off of the resulting hard exclusive scattering cross section for $K^+ p \to K^+ p$ at fixed CM angle is consistent with the dimensional counting rule for hard elastic scattering $\frac{d\sigma}{dt} (A+B \to C+D) \propto \frac{F(\theta_{CM}}{ s^{n_A + n_B + n_C + n_D -2}}$, where $n_A$ is the minimum number of constituents.

More generally, the amplitude for a hard exclusive reaction in QCD can be factorized at leading power as a product of the hard-scattering subprocess quark scattering amplitude $T$, where the hadrons are each replaced with their constituent valence quarks or gluons, with their respective light-front momenta $k^+ = x_i P^+$, $\vec k_\perp = x_i \vec P_\perp$ convoluted with the "distribution amplitude" $\phi_H(x_i, Q)$ for each initial and final hadron. The hard-scattering amplitude can then be computed systematically in perturbative QCD from the fundamental quark and gluon interactions of QCD. This factorization procedure can be carried out systematically since the effective QCD running coupling $\alpha_s(q^2)$ becomes small at high momentum transfer, because of the asymptotic freedom property of QCD.

The physics of each hadron enters through its distribution amplitudes $\phi_H(x_i, Q)$, which specifies the partitioning of the light-front momenta of the valence constituents $x_i = \frac{k^+_i}{P^+}$. It is given in light-cone gauge $A^+=0$ as $\Pi_i \int^Q d^2\vec k_{\perp i} \psi_H(x_i, \vec k_{\perp i } )$, the integral of the valence light-front wave function over the internal transverse momentum squared $k^2_\perp < Q^2$; the upper limit $Q^2$ is the characteristic transverse momentum in the exclusive reaction. The logarithmic evolution of the distribution amplitude in $\log Q^2$ is given rigorously in perturbative QCD by the ERBL evolution equation. The results are also consistent with general principles such as the renormalization group. The asymptotic behavior of the distribution such as $\phi_\pi \to \sqrt 3 f_\pi x(1-x)$ where $f_\pi$ is the decay constant measured in pion decay $\pi^+ \to W^* \to \mu^+ \nu_\mu$ can also be determined from first principles. The nonperturbative form of the hadron light-front wave function and distribution amplitude can be determined from AdS/QCD using light-front holography. The deuteron distribution amplitude has five components corresponding to the five different color-singlet combinations of six color triplet quarks, only one of which is the standard nuclear physics product $d \to n p$ of two color singlets. It obeys a $5 \times 5$ evolution equation leading to equal weighting of the five components of the deuteron's light-front wave function components at $Q^2 \to \infty.$ The new degrees of freedom are called "hidden color". Each hadron emitted from a hard exclusive reaction emerges with high momentum and small transverse size. A fundamental feature of gauge theory is that soft gluons decouple from the small color-dipole moment of the compact fast-moving color-singlet wave function configurations of the incident and final-state hadrons. The transversely compact color-singlet configurations can persist over a distance of order $E_{\rm lab} / Q^2$, the Ioffe coherence length. Thus, if we study hard quasi elastic processes in a nuclear target, the outgoing and ingoing hadrons will have minimal absorption - a novel phenomenon called "color transparency". This implies that quasi-elastic hadron-nucleon scattering at large momentum transfer can occur additively on all of the nucleons in a nucleus with minimal attenuation due to elastic or inelastic final state interactions in the nucleus, i.e. the nucleus becomes transparent. In contrast, in conventional Glauber scattering, one predicts nearly energy-independent initial and final-state attenuation. Color transparency has been verified in many hard-scattering exclusive experiments, particularly in the diffractive dijet experiment $\pi A \to Jet Jet A^\prime$ at Fermilab. This experiment also provides a measurement of the pion's light-front valence wave function from the observed $x$ and transverse momentum dependence of the produced dijets.

== Light-front holography ==
One of the most interesting recent advances in hadron physics has been the application to QCD of a branch of string theory, Anti-de Sitter/Conformal Field Theory (AdS/CFT). Although QCD is not a conformally invariant field theory, one can use the mathematical representation of the conformal group in five-dimensional anti-de Sitter space to construct an analytic first approximation to the theory. The resulting model, called AdS/QCD, gives accurate predictions for hadron spectroscopy and a description of the quark structure of mesons and baryons which has scale invariance and dimensional counting at short distances, together with color confinement at large distances.

"Light-Front Holography" refers to the remarkable fact that dynamics in AdS space in five dimensions is dual to a semiclassical approximation to Hamiltonian theory in physical $3+1$ space-time quantized at fixed light-front time. Remarkably, there is an exact correspondence between the fifth-dimension coordinate of AdS space and a specific impact variable $\zeta^2_\perp= b^2_\perp x(1-x)$ which measures the physical separation of the quark constituents within the hadron at fixed light-cone time $\tau$ and is conjugate to the invariant mass squared ${M^2_{q \bar q} }$. This connection allows one to compute the analytic form of the frame-independent simplified light-front wave functions for mesons and baryons that encode hadron properties and allow for the computation of exclusive scattering amplitudes.

In the case of mesons, the valence Fock-state wave functions of $H_{LF}$ for zero quark mass satisfy a single-variable relativistic equation of motion in the invariant variable $\zeta^2=b^2_\perp x(1-x)$, which is conjugate to the invariant mass squared ${M^2_{q \bar q} }$. The effective confining potential $U(\zeta^2)$ in this frame-independent "light-front Schrödinger equation" systematically incorporates the effects of higher quark and gluon Fock states. Remarkably, the potential has a unique form of a harmonic oscillator potential if one requires that the chiral QCD action remains conformally invariant. The result is a nonperturbative relativistic light-front quantum mechanical wave equation which incorporates color confinement and other essential spectroscopic and dynamical features of hadron physics.

These recent developments concerning AdS/CFT duality provide new insights about light-front wave functions which may form first approximations to the full solutions that one seeks in LFQCD, and be considered as a step in building a physically motivated Fock-space basis set to diagonalize the LFQCD Hamiltonian, as in the basis light-front quantization (BLFQ) method.

== Prediction of the cosmological constant ==
A major outstanding problem in theoretical physics is that most quantum field theories predict a huge value for the quantum vacuum. Such arguments are usually based on dimensional analysis and effective field theory. If the universe is described by an effective local quantum field theory down to the Planck scale, then we would expect a cosmological constant of the order of $M_{\rm pl}^4$. As noted above, the measured cosmological constant is smaller than this by a factor of 10^{−120}. This discrepancy has been called "the worst theoretical prediction in the history of physics!".

A possible solution is offered by light front quantization, a rigorous alternative to the usual second quantization method. Vacuum fluctuations do not appear in the Light-Front vacuum state. This absence means that there is no contribution from QED, Weak interactions and QCD to the cosmological constant which is thus predicted to be zero in a flat space-time. The measured small non-zero value of the cosmological constant could originate for example from a slight curvature of the shape of the universe (which is not excluded within 0.4% (as of 2017)) since a curved-space could modify the Higgs field zero-mode, thereby possibly producing a non-zero contribution to the cosmological constant.

== Intense lasers ==
High-intensity laser facilities offer prospects for directly measuring previously unobserved processes in QED, such as vacuum birefringence, photon-photon scattering and, still some way in the future, Schwinger pair production. Furthermore, `light-shining-through-walls' experiments can probe the low energy frontier of particle physics and search for beyond-standard-model particles. These possibilities have led to great interest in the properties of quantum field theories, in particular QED, in background fields describing intense light sources, and some of the fundamental predictions of the theory have been experimentally verified.

Despite the basic theory behind `strong-field QED' having been developed over 40 years ago, there have remained until recent years several theoretical ambiguities that can in part be attributed to the use of the instant-form in a theory which, because of the laser background, naturally singles out light-like directions. Thus, light-front quantization is a natural approach to physics in intense laser fields. The use of the front-form in strong-field QED has provided answers to several long standing questions, such as the nature of the effective mass in a laser pulse, the pole structure of the background-dressed propagator, and the origins of classical radiation reaction within QED.

Combined with nonperturbative approaches such as `time dependent basis light-front quantization', which is specifically targeted at time-dependent problems in field theory, the front-form promises to provide a better understanding of QED in external fields. Such investigations will also provide groundwork for understanding QCD physics in strong magnetic fields at, for example, RHIC.

== Nonperturbative quantum field theory ==
Quantum Chromodynamics (QCD), the theory of strong interactions, is a part of the Standard Model of elementary particles that also includes, besides QCD, the theory of electro-weak (EW) interactions. In view of the difference in strength of these interactions, one may treat the EW interactions as a perturbation in systems consisting of hadrons, the composite particles that respond to the strong interactions. Perturbation theory has its place in QCD also, but only at large values of the transferred energy or momentum where it exhibits the property of asymptotic freedom. The field of perturbative QCD is well developed and many phenomena have been described using it, such as factorization, parton distributions, single-spin asymmetries, and jets. However, at low values of the energy and momentum transfer, the strong interaction must be treated in a nonperturbative manner, since the interaction strength becomes large and the confinement of quarks and gluons, as the partonic components of the hadrons, cannot be ignored. There is a wealth of data in this strong interaction regime that is waiting for explanation in terms of calculations proceeding directly from the underlying theory. As one prominent application of an ab initio approach to QCD, many extensive experimental programs either measure directly, or depend upon the knowledge of, the probability distributions of the quark and gluon components of the hadrons.

Three approaches have produced considerable success in the strong-coupling area up to the present. First, hadronic models have been formulated and applied successfully. This success comes sometimes at the price of introducing parameters that need to be identified quantitatively. For example, the Relativistic String Hamiltonian depends on the current quark masses, the string tension, and a parameter corresponding to $\Lambda_{\rm QCD}$. The second method, lattice QCD, is an ab initio approach directly linked to the Lagrangian of QCD. Based on a Euclidean formulation, lattice QCD provides an estimate of the QCD path integral and opens access to low-energy hadronic properties such as masses. Although lattice QCD can estimate some observables directly, it does not provide the wave functions that are needed for the description of the structure and dynamics of hadrons. Third is the Dyson—Schwinger approach. It is also formulated in Euclidean space-time and employs models for vertex functions.

The light-front Hamiltonian approach is a fourth approach, which, in contrast to the lattice and Dyson–Schwinger approaches, is developed in Minkowski space and deals directly with wave functions - the main objects of quantum theory. Unlike the modeling approach, it is rooted in the fundamental Lagrangian of QCD.

Any field-theoretical Hamiltonian $H$ does not conserve the number of particles. Therefore, in the basis, corresponding to fixed number of particles, it is a non-diagonal matrix. Its eigenvector—the state vector of a physical system—is an infinite superposition (Fock decomposition) of the states with different numbers of particles: $| p \rangle = \sum_{n=1}^{\infty} \int \psi_n(k_1,\ldots,k_n,p)| n \rangle D_k.$

$\psi_n$ is the $n$-body wave function (Fock component) and $D_k$ is an integration measure. In light-front quantization, the Hamiltonian $H$ and the state vector $| p\rangle$ here are defined on the light-front plane.

In many cases, though not always, one can expect that a finite number of degrees of freedom dominates, that is, the decomposition in the Fock components converges enough quickly. In these cases the decomposition can be truncated, so that the infinite sum can be approximately replaced by a finite one. Then, substituting the truncated state vector in the eigenvector equation

$H | p \rangle=M | p \rangle,$

one obtains a finite system of integral equations for the Fock wave functions $\psi_n$ which can be solved numerically. Smallness of the coupling constant is not required. Therefore, the truncated solution is nonperturbative. This is the basis of a nonperturbative approach to the field theory which was developed and, for the present, applied to QED and to the Yukawa model.

The main difficulty in this way is to ensure cancellation of infinities after renormalization. In the perturbative approach, for a renormalizable field theory, in any fixed order of coupling constant, this cancellation is obtained as a by-product of the renormalization procedure. However, to ensure the cancellation, it is important to take into account the full set of graphs at a given order. Omitting some of these graphs destroys the cancellation and the infinities survive after renormalization. This is what happens after truncation of the Fock space; though the truncated solution can be decomposed into an infinite series in terms of the coupling constant, at any given order the series does not contain the full set of perturbative graphs. Therefore, the standardrenormalization scheme does not eliminate infinities.

In the approach of Brodsky et al. the infinities remain uncanceled, though it is expected that as soon as the number of sectors kept after truncation increases, the domain of stability of the results relative to the cutoff also increases. The value on this plateau of stability is just an approximation to the exact solution which is taken as the physical value.

The sector-dependent approach is constructed so as to restore cancellation of infinities for any given truncation. The values of the counterterms are constructed from sector to sector according to unambiguously formulated rules. The numerical results for the anomalous magnetic moment of fermion in the truncation keeping three Fock sectors are stable relative to increase of the cutoff. However, the interpretation of the wave functions, due to negative norm of the Pauli-Villars states introduced for regularization, becomes problematic. When the number of sectors increases, the results in both schemes should tend to each other and approach to the exact nonperturbative solution.

The light-front coupled-cluster approach (see Light-front computational methods#Light-front coupled-cluster method), avoids making a Fock-space truncation. Applications of this approach are just beginning.

=== Structure of hadrons ===
Experiments that need a conceptually and mathematically precise theoretical description of hadrons at the amplitude level include investigations of: the structure of nucleons and mesons, heavy quark systems and exotics, hard processes involving quark and gluon distributions in hadrons, heavy ion collisions, and many more. For example, LFQCD will offer the opportunity for an ab initio understanding of the microscopic origins of the spin content of the proton and how the intrinsic and spatial angular momenta are distributed among the partonic components in terms of the wave functions. This is an outstanding unsolved problem as experiments to date have not yet found the largest components of the proton spin. The components previously thought to be the leading carriers, the quarks, have been found to carry a small amount of the total spin. Generalized parton distributions (GPDs) were introduced to quantify each component of the spin content and have been used to analyze the experimental measurements of deeply virtual Compton scattering (DVCS). As another example, LFQCD will predict the masses, quantum numbers and widths of yet-to-be observed exotics such as glueballs and hybrids.

=== QCD at high temperature and density ===
There are major programs at accelerator facilities such as GSI-SIS, CERN-LHC, and BNL-RHIC to investigate the properties of a new state of matter, the quark–gluon plasma, and other features of the QCD phase diagram. In the early universe, temperatures were high, while net baryon densities were low. In contrast, in compact stellar objects, temperatures are low, and the baryon density is high. QCD describes both extremes. However, reliable perturbative calculations can only be performed at asymptotically large temperatures and densities, where the running coupling constant of QCD is small due to asymptotic freedom, and lattice QCD provides information only at very low chemical potential (baryon density). Thus, many frontier questions remain to be answered. What is the nature of the phase transitions? How does the matter behave in the vicinity of the phase boundaries? What are the observable signatures of the transition in transient heavy-ion collisions? LFQCD opens a new avenue for addressing these issues.

In recent years a general formalism to directly compute the partition function in light-front quantization has been developed and numerical methods are under development for evaluating this partition function in LFQCD. Light-front quantization leads to new definitions of the partition function and temperature which can provide a frame-independent description of thermal and statistical systems. The goal is to establish a tool comparable in power to lattice QCD but extending the partition function to finite chemical potentials where experimental data are available.

== See also ==
- Light front quantization
- Light-front computational methods
- Quantum field theories
- Quantum chromodynamics
- Quantum electrodynamics
- Light-front holography
