= Guy de Téramond Peralta =

Costa Rican-French physicist

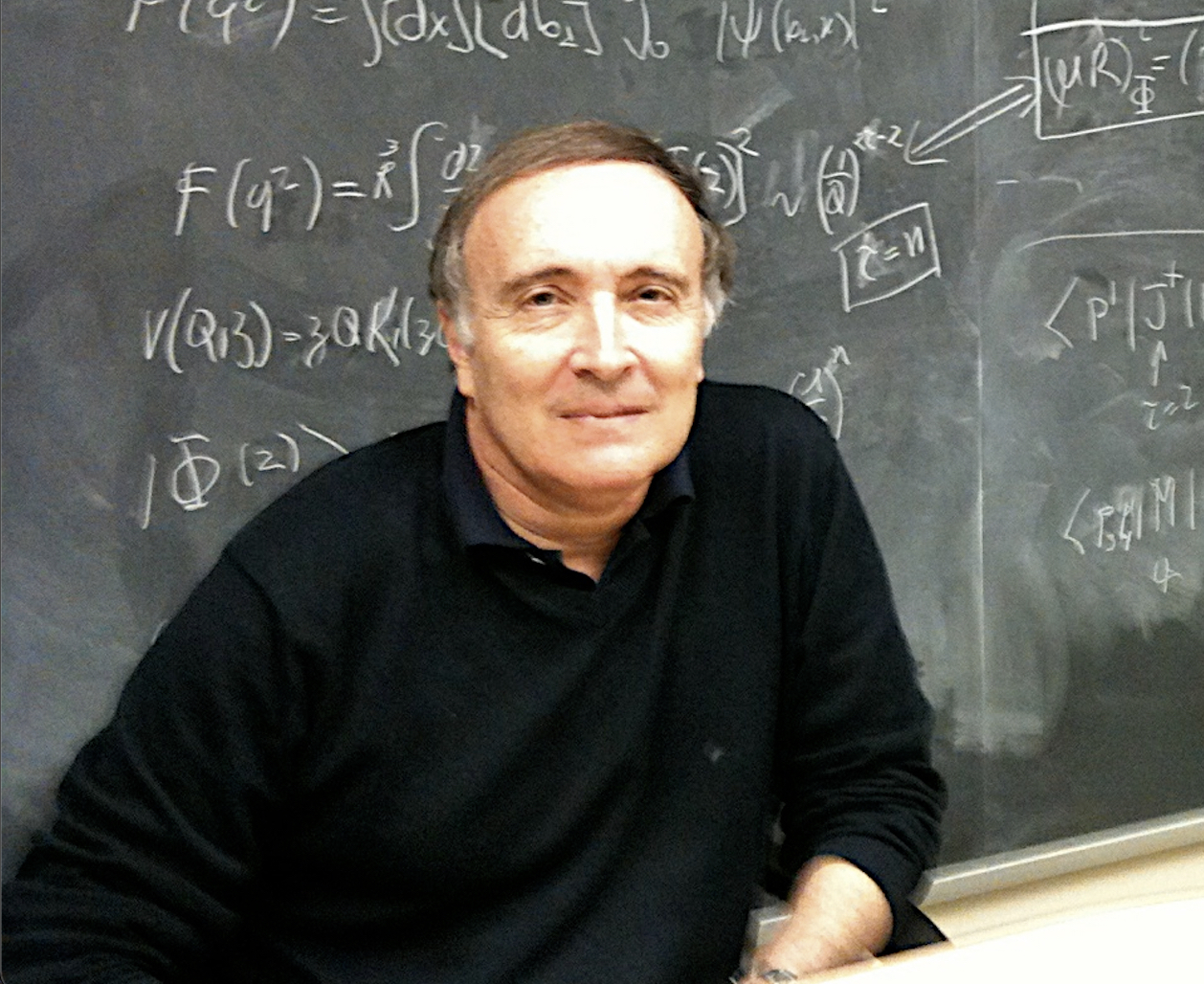
- De Téramond in 2013
- Born: Gautier de Téramond Peralta; Biarritz, France
- Education: University of Paris
- Known for: Hadronic structure Internet connectivity
- Scientific career
- Fields: Physics, Internetworking
- Workplaces: University of Costa Rica; SLAC National Accelerator Laboratory
- Doctoral advisors: Mary K. Gaillard; Jean Trân Thanh Vân

Guy de Téramond Peralta is a Costa Rican-French theoretical physicist. His research has been focused on nuclear and high energy physics. Following the quest for a wave equation similar to the Schrödinger equation in atomic physics, he introduced with Stanley Brodsky a nonperturbative first approximation to quantum chromodynamics to describe hadronic structure, known as light front holography. This analytic approach to the strong interactions is based on light front quantization and the AdS/CFT correspondence. He is also known for his role in the pioneering interconnections in Costa Rica and the Central American region to the Internet. In 2023, de Téramond was inducted into the Internet Hall of Fame by the Internet Society.

== Education and scientific career ==
De Téramond obtained his Doctorat de Troisième Cycle from the Pierre et Marie Curie University in 1973 and completed his Doctorat d'État in Theoretical Physics in 1977 from the University of Paris at Orsay, under the supervision of Mary K. Gaillard and Jean Trân Thanh Vân. He became Assistant Professor of Physics at the University of Costa Rica in 1977 and Full Professor in 1982. He was a visiting scientist at the Lyman Laboratory of Physics at Harvard University (1983-1984), SLAC National Accelerator Laboratory at Stanford University (1986-1988) and at the École Polytechnique in 2007.

== Research ==
De Téramond's thesis led, in a joint experiment of the Universities of Lausanne, Munich and Zurich in 1979, to the confirmation of the charge symmetry breaking of the nuclear forces. In collaboration with Stanley Brodsky and Ivan Schmidt he studied in 1990 the properties of a possible form of nuclear matter catalyzed by heavy quarks, known as hadro-charmonium.

His research in collaboration with Brodsky and Hans Günter Dosch is centered on the extension and applications of holographic light front QCD (HLFQCD) to hadron structure and dynamics, based on the holographic embedding of light-front physics in a higher dimensional gravity theory (gauge/gravity duality). Using the new holographic approach he also explored with Brodsky and Alexandre Deur the strength of the strong force at large distances where QCD iteration methods fail.

More recently, also in collaboration with Brodsky and Dosch, it was found that color symmetry and confinement are manifest as an underlying superconformal algebraic structure in holographic QCD, which also leads to specific connections between mesons and baryons.

De Téramond is an active member of the HLFHS Collaboration for the applications of the new holographic theories to strong interactions; in particular, to the study of the quark and gluon distribution functions in hadrons, including the strange and charm quark sea distribution in the proton, which are evolved to higher scales for meaningful comparisons with existing or upcoming experimental results.

== Networking projects ==
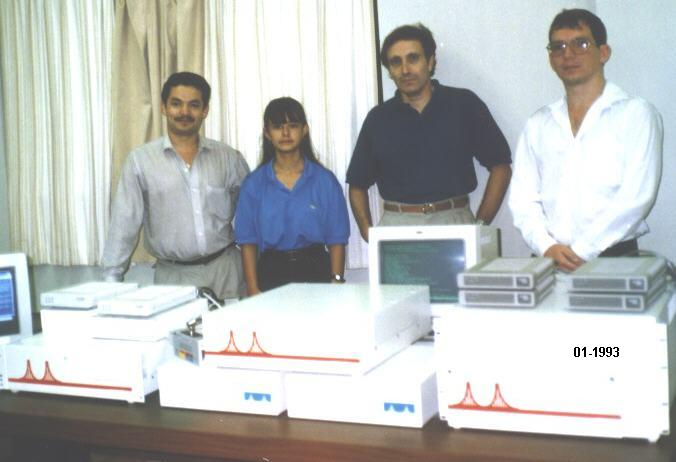
CRNet routing equipment at UCR: Abel Brenes, Ana L. Chavarría, de Téramond and Mario Guerra (April 1993).

In January 1990, de Téramond was commissioned by the Vice-President for Research of the University of Costa Rica (UCR) to lead the project for the connection of the University to BITNET, the academic computer network at the City University of New York and Yale University.

The first BITNET connection was achieved in November 1990 with Florida Atlantic University using a digital satellite link from PanAmSat, followed by the connection of Panama in 1992 to the UCR node. Concurrently, de Téramond led the project which culminated with the interconnection of the University of Costa Rica to the Internet in January 1993 using a point of presence (POP) established by the National Science Foundation (NSF) in Homestead, Florida. He coordinated the initiative for the implementation of the National Research Network (CRNet) based on the TCP/IP protocols. The project (1993-2000) was driven by the University of Costa Rica and the Ministry of Science and Technology and became operational in April 1993.

Under Saul Hahn's Hemisphere Wide Inter-University Scientific and Technological Information Network project (RedHUCyT) of the Organization of American States, de Téramond and his team of engineers from the University of Costa Rica participated in the pioneering connections of the Central American and Caribbean region to the Internet: Nicaragua (1994), Panama (1994), Honduras (1995), Jamaica (1995), Guatemala (1995), El Salvador (1996) and Belize (1997). With the support of the Costa Rican government, RedHUCyT provided a satellite ground station for the academic network. The antenna was inaugurated at the UCR campus on April 1997, thus ending a long controversy with the telecommunication's monopoly.

De Téramond was the Director of the Computer Center at the University of Costa Rica (1997–2000) and Minister of Science and Technology of Costa Rica (2000-2002), where he led, jointly with the Instituto Costarricense de Electricidad (ICE), the implementation of the Advanced Internet Network to bring broadband connectivity across the country. The project network architecture was based on IP over ICE's optical fiber and the MPLS routing protocol. The first phase of this project was successfully implemented in April 2001.

He is a member of the board of directors of the Network Information Center (NIC CR) since its creation in the early 90's. More recently, he participated in the establishment of the Internet Exchange Point (CRIX) to allow the direct data exchange among all the participant autonomous systems, lowering the network delay and the costs of the international links. CRIX was inaugurated in 2014. He also contributed setting-up the Internet Consulting Council in Costa Rica (CCI) which has become a reference point for Internet Governance.

== Awards ==
- Fulbright Research Award (1983)
- Guggenheim Fellow (1986)
- Leonov Medallion (1997)
- Wolfram Innovator Award (2020)
- Internet Hall of Fame (2023)
