= Light front quantization =

Technique in computational quantum field theory

The light cone of special relativity. Light-front quantization uses light-front (or light-cone) coordinates to select an initial surface that is tangential to the light cone. Equal-time quantization uses an initial surface that is horizontal, labeled here as the "hypersurface of the present".

The light-front quantization of quantum field theories provides a useful alternative to ordinary equal-time quantization. In particular, it can lead to a relativistic description of bound systems in terms of quantum-mechanical wave functions. The quantization is based on the choice of light-front coordinates, where $x^+\equiv ct+z$ plays the role of time and the corresponding spatial coordinate is $x^-\equiv ct-z$. Here, $t$ is the ordinary time, $z$ is one Cartesian coordinate, and $c$ is the speed of light. The other two Cartesian coordinates, $x$ and $y$, are untouched and often called transverse or perpendicular, denoted by symbols of the type $\vec x_\perp = (x,y)$. The choice of the frame of reference where the time $t$ and $z$-axis are defined can be left unspecified in an exactly soluble relativistic theory, but in practical calculations some choices may be more suitable than others.

== Overview ==
In practice, virtually all measurements are made at fixed light-front time. For example, when an electron scatters on a proton as in the famous SLAC experiments that discovered the quark structure of hadrons, the interaction with the constituents occurs at a single light-front time. When one takes a flash photograph, the recorded image shows the object as the front of the light wave from the flash crosses the object. Thus Dirac used the terminology "light-front" and "front form" in contrast to ordinary instant time and "instant form". Light waves traveling in the negative $z$ direction continue to propagate in $x^-$ at a single light-front time $x^+$.

As emphasized by Dirac, Lorentz boosts of states at fixed light-front time are simple kinematic transformations. The description of physical systems in light-front coordinates is unchanged by light-front boosts to frames moving with respect to the one specified initially. This also means that there is a separation of external and internal coordinates (just as in nonrelativistic systems), and the internal wave functions are independent of the external coordinates, if there is no external force or field. In contrast, it is a difficult dynamical problem to calculate the effects of boosts of states defined at a fixed instant time $t$.

The description of a bound state in a quantum field theory, such as an atom in quantum electrodynamics (QED) or a hadron in quantum chromodynamics (QCD), generally requires multiple wave functions, because quantum field theories include processes which create and annihilate particles. The state of the system then does not have a definite number of particles, but is instead a quantum-mechanical linear combination of Fock states, each with a definite particle number. Any single measurement of particle number will return a value with a probability determined by the amplitude of the Fock state with that number of particles. These amplitudes are the light-front wave functions. The light-front wave functions are each frame-independent and independent of the total momentum.

The wave functions are the solution of a field-theoretic analog of the Schrödinger equation $H\psi=E\psi$ of nonrelativistic quantum mechanics. In the nonrelativistic theory the Hamiltonian operator $H$ is just a kinetic piece $-\frac{\hbar^2}{2m}\nabla^2$ and a potential piece $V(\vec r)$. The wave function $\psi$ is a function of the coordinate $\vec r$, and $E$ is the energy. In light-front quantization, the formulation is usually written in terms of light-front momenta $\underline{p}_i=(p_i^+,\vec p_{\perp i})$, with $i$ a particle index, $p_i^+\equiv\sqrt{p_i^2+m_i^2}+p_{iz}$, $\vec p_{\perp i}=(p_{ix},p_{iy})$, and $m_i$ the particle mass, and light-front energies $p_i^-\equiv\sqrt{p_i^2+m_i^2}-p_{iz}$. They satisfy the mass-shell condition $m_i^2=p_i^+p_i^--\vec p_{\perp i}^2$

The analog of the nonrelativistic Hamiltonian $H$ is the light-front operator $\mathcal{P}^-$, which generates translations in light-front time. It is constructed from the Lagrangian for the chosen quantum field theory. The total light-front momentum of the system, $\underline{P}\equiv(P^+,\vec P_\perp)$, is the sum of the single-particle light-front momenta. The total light-front energy $P^-$ is fixed by the mass-shell condition to be $(M^2+P_\perp^2)/P^+$, where $M$ is the invariant mass of the system. The Schrödinger-like equation of light-front quantization is then $\mathcal{P}^-\psi=\frac{M^2+P_\perp^2}{P^+}\psi$. This provides a foundation for a nonperturbative analysis of quantum field theories that is quite distinct from the lattice approach.

Quantization on the light-front provides the rigorous field-theoretical realization of the intuitive ideas of the parton model which is formulated at fixed $t$ in the infinite-momentum frame. (see #Infinite momentum frame). The same results are obtained in the front form for any frame; e.g., the structure functions and other probabilistic parton distributions measured in deep inelastic scattering are obtained from the squares of the boost-invariant light-front wave functions, the eigensolution of the light-front Hamiltonian. The Bjorken kinematic variable $x_{bj}$ of deep inelastic scattering becomes identified with the light-front fraction at small $x$. The Balitsky–Fadin–Kuraev–Lipatov (BFKL) Regge behavior of structure functions can be demonstrated from the behavior of light-front wave functions at small $x$. The Dokshitzer–Gribov–Lipatov–Altarelli–Parisi (DGLAP) evolution of structure functions and the Efremov–Radyushkin–Brodsky–Lepage (ERBL) evolution of distribution amplitudes in $\log Q^2$ are properties of the light-front wave functions at high transverse momentum.

Computing hadronic matrix elements of currents is particularly simple on the light-front, since they can be obtained rigorously as overlaps of light-front wave functions as in the Drell–Yan–West formula.

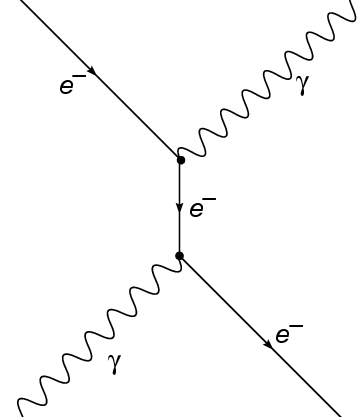
Compton scattering of a photon by an electron

The gauge-invariant meson and baryon distribution amplitudes which control hard exclusive and direct reactions are the valence light-front wave functions integrated over transverse momentum at fixed $x_i= {k^+ _i/ P^+}$. The "ERBL" evolution of distribution amplitudes and the factorization theorems for hard exclusive processes can be derived most easily using light-front methods. Given the frame-independent light-front wave functions, one can compute a large range of hadronic observables including generalized parton distributions, Wigner distributions, etc. For example, the "handbag" contribution to the generalized parton distributions for deeply virtual Compton scattering, which can be computed from the overlap of light-front wave functions, automatically satisfies the known sum rules.

The light-front wave functions contain information about novel features of QCD. These include effects suggested from other approaches, such as color transparency, hidden color, intrinsic charm, sea-quark symmetries, dijet diffraction, direct hard processes, and hadronic spin dynamics.

Deep inelastic electron-proton scattering

One can also prove fundamental theorems for relativistic quantum field theories using the front form, including: (a) the cluster decomposition theorem and (b) the vanishing of the anomalous gravitomagnetic moment for any Fock state of a hadron; one also can show that a nonzero anomalous magnetic moment of a bound state requires nonzero angular momentum of the constituents. The cluster properties of light-front time-ordered perturbation theory, together with $J^z$ conservation, can be used to elegantly derive the Parke–Taylor rules for multi-gluon scattering amplitudes. The counting-rule behavior of structure functions at large $x$ and Bloom–Gilman duality have also been derived in light-front QCD (LFQCD). The existence of "lensing effects" at leading twist, such as the $T$-odd "Sivers effect" in spin-dependent semi-inclusive deep-inelastic scattering, was first demonstrated using light-front methods.

Light-front quantization is thus the natural framework for the description of the nonperturbative relativistic bound-state structure of hadrons in quantum chromodynamics. The formalism is rigorous, relativistic, and frame-independent. However, there exist subtle problems in LFQCD that require thorough investigation. For example, the complexities of the vacuum in the usual instant-time formulation, such as the Higgs mechanism and condensates in $\phi^4$ theory, have their counterparts in zero modes or, possibly, in additional terms in the LFQCD Hamiltonian that are allowed by power counting. Light-front considerations of the vacuum as well as the problem of achieving full covariance in LFQCD require close attention to the light-front singularities and zero-mode contributions. The truncation of the light-front Fock-space calls for the introduction of effective quark and gluon degrees of freedom to overcome truncation effects. Introduction of such effective degrees of freedom is what one desires in seeking the dynamical connection between canonical (or current) quarks and effective (or constituent) quarks that Melosh sought, and Gell-Mann advocated, as a method for truncating QCD.

The light-front Hamiltonian formulation thus opens access to QCD at the amplitude level and is poised to become the foundation for a common treatment of spectroscopy and the parton structure of hadrons in a single covariant formalism, providing a unifying connection between low-energy and high-energy experimental data that so far remain largely disconnected.

== Fundamentals ==
Front-form relativistic quantum mechanics was introduced by Paul Dirac in a 1949 paper published in Reviews of Modern Physics. Light-front quantum field theory is the front-form representation of local relativistic quantum field theory.

The relativistic invariance of a quantum theory means that the observables (probabilities, expectation values and ensemble averages) have the same values in all inertial coordinate systems. Since different inertial coordinate systems are related by inhomogeneous Lorentz transformations (Poincaré transformations), this requires that the Poincaré group is a symmetry group of the theory. Wigner and Bargmann showed that this symmetry must be realized by a unitary representation of the connected component of the Poincaré group on the Hilbert space of the quantum theory. The Poincaré symmetry is a dynamical symmetry because Poincaré transformations mix both space and time variables. The dynamical nature of this symmetry is most easily seen by noting that the Hamiltonian appears on the right-hand side of three of the commutators of the Poincaré generators, $[K^j,P^k] = i\delta^{jk}H$, where $P^k$ are components of the linear momentum and $K^j$ are components of rotation-less boost generators. If the Hamiltonian includes interactions, i.e. $H=H_0 +V$, then the commutation relations cannot be satisfied unless at least three of the Poincaré generators also include interactions.

Dirac's paper introduced three distinct ways to minimally include interactions in the Poincaré Lie algebra. He referred to the different minimal choices as the "instant-form", "point-form" and "front-from" of the dynamics. Each "form of dynamics" is characterized by a different interaction-free (kinematic) subgroup of the Poincaré group. In Dirac's instant-form dynamics the kinematic subgroup is the three-dimensional Euclidean subgroup generated by spatial translations and rotations, in Dirac's point-form dynamics the kinematic subgroup is the Lorentz group and in Dirac's "light-front dynamics" the kinematic subgroup is the group of transformations that leave a three-dimensional hyperplane tangent to the light cone invariant.

A light front is a three-dimensional hyperplane defined by the condition:

| $x^+ = x^0 + \vec{x} \cdot \hat{n} =0,$ | 1 |

with $x^0=ct$, where the usual convention is to choose $\hat{n} = \hat{z}$. Coordinates of points on the light-front hyperplane are

| $x^- = x^0 - \vec{x} \cdot \hat{n} \quad \mbox{and} \quad \vec{x}_{\perp}:= \vec{x} - \hat{n}(\hat{n} \cdot \vec{x}).$ | 2 |

The Lorentz invariant inner product of two four-vectors, $x$ and $y$, can be expressed in terms of their light-front components as

| $x \cdot y = \frac12 (x^-y^+ + x^+ y^-)- \vec{x}_{\perp} \cdot \vec{y}_{\perp} .$ | 3 |

In a front-form relativistic quantum theory the three interacting generators of the Poincaré group are $P^-:= H-\vec{P}\cdot \hat{n}$, the generator of translations normal to the light front, and $\vec{J}_{\perp}:= \vec{J} -\hat{n}(\hat{n} \cdot \vec{J})$, the generators of rotations transverse to the light-front. $P^-$ is called the "light-front" Hamiltonian.

The kinematic generators, which generate transformations tangent to the light front, are free of interaction. These include $P^+:= H+\vec{P}\cdot \hat{n}$ and $\vec{P}_{\perp}:= \vec{P} -\hat{n}( \hat{n} \cdot \vec{P})$, which generate translations tangent to the light front, $J_3:=\hat{n} \cdot \vec{J}$ which generates rotations about the $\hat{n}$ axis, and the generators $K_3:=\hat{n} \cdot \vec{K}$, $E_1$ and $E_2$ of light-front preserving boosts,

| $(p^+ ,\vec{p}_{\perp}) \to (p^{+\prime} ,\vec{p}_{\perp}') = (v^+ p^+, \vec{p}_{\perp} +\vec{v}_{\perp} x^+),$ | 4 |

which form a closed subalgebra.

Light-front quantum theories have the following distinguishing properties:

- Only three Poincaré generators include interactions. All of Dirac's other forms of the dynamics require four or more interacting generators.
- The light-front boosts are a three-parameter subgroup of the Lorentz group that leave the light front invariant.
- The spectrum of the kinematic generator, $P^+$, is the positive real line.

These properties have consequences that are useful in applications.

There is no loss of generality in using light-front relativistic quantum theories. For systems of a finite number of degrees of freedom there are explicit $S$-matrix-preserving unitary transformations that transform theories with light-front kinematic subgroups to equivalent theories with instant-form or point-form kinematic subgroups. One expects that this is true in quantum field theory, although establishing the equivalence requires a nonperturbative definition of the theories in different forms of dynamics.

=== Light-front Commutation Relations ===
Canonical commutation relations at equal time are the centerpiece of the canonical quantization method to quantized fields. In the standard quantization method (the "Instant Form" in Dirac's classification of relativistic dynamics), the relations are, for example here for a spin-0 field $\phi$ and its canonical conjugate $\pi$:

$${\rm Instant~Form:}~~[\phi(t, \vec x),\phi(t, \vec y)] = 0, \ \ [\pi(t, \vec x), \pi(t, \vec y)] = 0, \ \ [\phi(t, \vec x),\pi(t, \vec y)] = i\hbar \delta^3( \vec x- \vec y),$$

where the relations are taken at equal time $t$, and $\vec x$ and $\vec y$ are the space variables. The equal-time requirement imposes that $\vec x - \vec y$ is a spacelike quantity. The non-zero value of the commutator $[\phi(t, \vec x),\pi(t, \vec y)]$ expresses the fact that when $\phi$ and $\pi$ are separated by a spacelike distance, they cannot communicate with each other and thus commute, except when their separation $\vec x - \vec y \to 0$.

In the Light-Front form however, fields at equal time $x^+$ are causally linked (i.e., they can communicate) since the Light-Front time $x^+ \equiv t-z$ is along the light cone. Consequently, the Light-Front canonical commutation relations are different. For instance:

$${\rm Light-Front~form:}~~[\phi(x^+,  \vec x),\phi(x^+,  \vec y)] = \frac{i}{4}\epsilon(x^- -y^-)\delta^2( \vec{x_\bot} - \vec{y_\bot}),$$

where $\epsilon(x)=\theta(x)-\theta(-x)$ is the antisymmetric Heaviside step function.

On the other hand, the commutation relations for the creation and annihilation operators are similar for both the Instant and Light-Front forms:

$${\rm Instant~Form:}~~[a(t, \vec k),a(t, \vec l)] = 0, \ \ [a^\dagger(t, \vec k),a^\dagger(t, \vec l)] = 0, \ \  [a(t, \vec k),a^\dagger(t, \vec l)]= \hbar \delta^3( \vec k- \vec l).$$

$${\rm Light-Front~form:}~~[a(x^+, \vec k),a(x^+, \vec l)] = 0, \ \ [a^\dagger(x^+, \vec k),a^\dagger(x^+, \vec l)] = 0, \ \  [a(x^+, \vec k),a^\dagger(x^+, \vec l)]= \hbar \delta(k^+-l^+) \delta^2( \vec{k_\bot}- \vec{l_\bot}).$$

where $\vec k$ and $\vec l$ are the wavevectors of the fields, $k^+ = k_0 + k_3$ and $l^+ = l_0 + l_3$.

=== Light-front boosts ===
In general if one multiplies a Lorentz boost on the right by a momentum-dependent rotation, which leaves the rest vector unchanged, the result is a different type of boost. In principle there are as many different kinds of boosts as there are momentum-dependent rotations. The most common choices are rotation-less boosts, helicity boosts, and light-front boosts. The light-front boost (4) is a Lorentz boost that leaves the light front invariant.

The light-front boosts are not only members of the light-front kinematic subgroup, but they also form a closed three-parameter subgroup. This has two consequences. First, because the boosts do not involve interactions, the unitary representations of light-front boosts of an interacting system of particles are tensor products of single-particle representations of light-front boosts. Second, because these boosts form a subgroup, arbitrary sequences of light-front boosts that return to the starting frame do not generate Wigner rotations.

The spin of a particle in a relativistic quantum theory is the angular momentum of the particle in its rest frame. Spin observables are defined by boosting the particle's angular momentum tensor to the particle's rest frame

| $j^j = \frac12 \sum \epsilon_{jkl} \Lambda^{-1} (p)^{k}{}_{\mu} \Lambda^{-1} (p)^{l}{}_{\nu} J^{\mu \nu},$ | 5 |

where $\Lambda^{-1} (p)^{\mu}{}_{\nu}$ is a Lorentz boost that transforms $p^\mu$ to $(m,\vec{0})$.

The components of the resulting spin vector, $\vec{j}$, always satisfy $SU(2)$ commutation relations, but the individual components will depend on the choice of boost $\Lambda^{-1} (P)^{\mu}{}_{\nu}$. The light-front components of the spin are obtained by choosing $\Lambda^{-1} (P)^{k}{}_{\mu}$ to be the inverse of the light-front preserving boost, (4).

The light-front components of the spin are the components of the spin measured in the particle's rest frame after transforming the particle to its rest frame with the light-front preserving boost (4). The light-front spin is invariant with respect to light-front preserving-boosts because these boosts do not generate Wigner rotations. The component of this spin along the $\hat{n}$ direction is called the light-front helicity. In addition to being invariant, it is also a kinematic observable, i.e. free of interactions. It is called a helicity because the spin quantization axis is determined by the orientation of the light front. It differs from the Jacob–Wick helicity, where the quantization axis is determined by the direction of the momentum.

These properties simplify the computation of current matrix elements because (1) initial and final states in different frames are related by kinematic Lorentz transformations, (2) the one-body contributions to the current matrix, which are important for hard scattering, do not mix with the interaction-dependent parts of the current under light front boosts and (3) the light-front helicities remain invariant with respect to the light-front boosts. Thus, light-front helicity is conserved by every interaction at every vertex.

Because of these properties, front-form quantum theory is the only form of relativistic dynamics that has true "frame-independent" impulse approximations, in the sense that one-body current operators remain one-body operators in all frames related by light-front boosts and the momentum transferred to the system is identical to the momentum transferred to the constituent particles. Dynamical constraints, which follow from rotational covariance and current covariance, relate matrix elements with different magnetic quantum numbers. This means that consistent impulse approximations can only be applied to linearly independent current matrix elements.

=== Spectral condition ===
A second unique feature of light-front quantum theory follows because the operator $P^+$ is non-negative and kinematic. The kinematic feature means that the generator $P^+$ is the sum of the non-negative single-particle $P_i^+$ generators, ($P^+= \sum_i P_i^+)$. It follows that if $P^+$ is zero on a state, then each of the individual $P_i^+$ must also vanish on the state.

In perturbative light-front quantum field theory this property leads to a suppression of a large class of diagrams, including all vacuum diagrams, which have zero internal $P^+$. The condition $P^+=0$ corresponds to infinite momentum $(-P^3\to H)$. Many of the simplifications of light-front quantum field theory are realized in the infinite momentum limit of ordinary canonical field theory (see #Infinite momentum frame).

An important consequence of the spectral condition on $P^+$ and the subsequent suppression of the vacuum diagrams in perturbative field theory is that the perturbative vacuum is the same as the free-field vacuum. This results in one of the great simplifications of light-front quantum field theory, but it also leads to some puzzles with regard the formulation of theories with spontaneously broken symmetries.

=== Equivalence of forms of dynamics ===
Sokolov demonstrated that relativistic quantum theories based on different forms of dynamics are related by $S$-matrix-preserving unitary transformations. The equivalence in field theories is more complicated because the definition of the field theory requires a redefinition of the ill-defined local operator products that appear in the dynamical generators. This is achieved through renormalization. At the perturbative level, the ultraviolet divergences of a canonical field theory are replaced by a mixture of ultraviolet and infrared $(P^+=0)$ divergences in light-front field theory. These have to be renormalized in a manner that recovers the full rotational covariance and maintains the $S$-matrix equivalence. The renormalization of light front field theories is discussed in Light-front computational methods#Renormalization group.

=== Classical vs quantum ===
One of the properties of the classical wave equation is that the light-front is a characteristic surface for the initial value problem. This means the data on the light front is insufficient to generate a unique evolution off of the light front. If one thinks in purely classical terms one might anticipate that this problem could lead to an ill-defined quantum theory upon quantization.

In the quantum case the problem is to find a set of ten self-adjoint operators that satisfy the Poincaré Lie algebra. In the absence of interactions, Stone's theorem applied to tensor products of known unitary irreducible representations of the Poincaré group gives a set of self-adjoint light-front generators with all of the required properties. The problem of adding interactions is no different than it is in non-relativistic quantum mechanics, except that the added interactions also need to preserve the commutation relations.

There are, however, some related observations. One is that if one takes seriously the classical picture of evolution off of surfaces with different values of $x^+$, one finds that the surfaces with $x^+\not=0$ are only invariant under a six parameter subgroup. This means that if one chooses a quantization surface with a fixed non-zero value of $x^+$, the resulting quantum theory would require a fourth interacting generator. This does not happen in light-front quantum mechanics; all seven kinematic generators remain kinematic. The reason is that the choice of light front is more closely related to the choice of kinematic subgroup, than the choice of an initial value surface.

In quantum field theory, the vacuum expectation value of two fields restricted to the light front are not well-defined distributions on test functions restricted to the light front. They only become well defined distributions on functions of four space time variables.

=== Rotational invariance ===
The dynamical nature of rotations in light-front quantum theory means that preserving full rotational invariance is non-trivial. In field theory, Noether's theorem provides explicit expressions for the rotation generators, but truncations to a finite number of degrees of freedom can lead to violations of rotational invariance. The general problem is how to construct dynamical rotation generators that satisfy Poincaré commutation relations with $P^-$ and the rest of the kinematic generators. A related problem is that, given that the choice of orientation of the light front manifestly breaks the rotational symmetry of the theory, how is the rotational symmetry of the theory recovered?

Given a dynamical unitary representation of rotations, $U(R)$, the product $U_0(R) U^{\dagger}(R)$ of a kinematic rotation with the inverse of the corresponding dynamical rotation is a unitary operator that (1) preserves the $S$-matrix and (2) changes the kinematic subgroup to a kinematic subgroup with a rotated light front, $\hat{n}'= R\hat{n}$. Conversely, if the $S$-matrix is invariant with respect to changing the orientation of the light-front, then the dynamical unitary representation of rotations, $U(R)$, can be constructed using the generalized wave operators for different orientations of the light front and the kinematic representation of rotations

| $U(R) = \Omega_{\pm} (\hat{n}) \Omega^{\dagger}_{\pm} (R\hat{n})U_0(R).$ | 6 |

Because the dynamical input to the $S$-matrix is $P^-$, the invariance of the $S$-matrix with respect to changing the orientation of the light front implies the existence of a consistent dynamical rotation generator without the need to explicitly construct that generator. The success or failure of this approach is related to ensuring the correct rotational properties of the asymptotic states used to construct the wave operators, which in turn requires that the subsystem bound states transform irreducibly with respect to $SU(2)$.

These observations make it clear that the rotational covariance of the theory is encoded in the choice of light-front Hamiltonian. Karmanov introduced a covariant formulation of light-front quantum theory, where the orientation of the light front is treated as a degree of freedom. This formalism can be used to identify observables that do not depend on the orientation, $\hat{n}$, of the light front (see #Covariant formulation).

While the light-front components of the spin are invariant under light-front boosts, they Wigner rotate under rotation-less boosts and ordinary rotations. Under rotations the light-front components of the single-particle spins of different particles experience different Wigner rotations. This means that the light-front spin components cannot be directly coupled using the standard rules of angular momentum addition. Instead, they must first be transformed to the more standard canonical spin components, which have the property that the Wigner rotation of a rotation is the rotation. The spins can then be added using the standard rules of angular momentum addition and the resulting composite canonical spin components can be transformed back to the light-front composite spin components. The transformations between the different types of spin components are called Melosh rotations. They are the momentum-dependent rotations constructed by multiplying a light-front boost followed by the inverse of the corresponding rotation-less boost. In order to also add the relative orbital angular momenta, the relative orbital angular momenta of each particle must also be converted to a representation where they Wigner rotate with the spins.

While the problem of adding spins and internal orbital angular momenta is more complicated, it is only total angular momentum that requires interactions; the total spin does not necessarily require an interaction dependence. Where the interaction dependence explicitly appears is in the relation between the total spin and the total angular momentum

| $\vec{J}_{\perp}= \frac{1}{P^+} [ \frac12 (P^+ - P^-)(\hat{n}\times \vec{E}_{\perp}) - (\hat{n} \times \vec{P}_{\perp} )(\vec{K} \cdot \hat{n}) + \vec{P}_{\perp} (\hat{n} \cdot \vec{j}) + M \vec{j}_{\perp}],$ | 1 |

where here $P^-$ and $M$ contain interactions. The transverse components of the light-front spin, $\vec{j}_{\perp}$ may or may not have an interaction dependence; however, if one also demands cluster properties, then the transverse components of total spin necessarily have an interaction dependence. The result is that by choosing the light front components of the spin to be kinematic it is possible to realize full rotational invariance at the expense of cluster properties. Alternatively it is easy to realize cluster properties at the expense of full rotational symmetry. For models of a finite number of degrees of freedom there are constructions that realize both full rotational covariance and cluster properties; these realizations all have additional many-body interactions in the generators that are functions of fewer-body interactions.

The dynamical nature of the rotation generators means that tensor and spinor operators, whose commutation relations with the rotation generators are linear in the components of these operators, impose dynamical constraints that relate different components of these operators.

=== Nonperturbative dynamics ===
The strategy for performing nonperturbative calculations in light-front field theory is similar to the strategy used in lattice calculations. In both cases a nonperturbative regularization and renormalization are used to try to construct effective theories of a finite number of degrees of freedom that are insensitive to the eliminated degrees of freedom. In both cases the success of the renormalization program requires that the theory has a fixed point of the renormalization group; however, the details of the two approaches differ. The renormalization methods used in light-front field theory are discussed in Light-front computational methods#Renormalization group. In the lattice case the computation of observables in the effective theory involves the evaluation of large-dimensional integrals, while in the case of light-front field theory solutions of the effective theory involve solving large systems of linear equations. In both cases multi-dimensional integrals and linear systems are sufficiently well understood to formally estimate numerical errors. In practice such calculations can only be performed for the simplest systems. Light-front calculations have the special advantage that the calculations are all in Minkowski space and the results are wave functions and scattering amplitudes.

== Relativistic quantum mechanics ==
While most applications of light-front quantum mechanics are to the light-front formulation of quantum field theory, it is also possible to formulate relativistic quantum mechanics of finite systems of directly interacting particles with a light-front kinematic subgroup. Light-front relativistic quantum mechanics is formulated on the direct sum of tensor products of single-particle Hilbert spaces. The kinematic representation $U_0(\Lambda ,a)$ of the Poincaré group on this space is the direct sum of tensor products of the single-particle unitary irreducible representations of the Poincaré group. A front-form dynamics on this space is defined by a dynamical representation of the Poincaré group $U(\Lambda ,a)$ on this space where $U(g) = U_0(g)$ when $g$ is in the kinematic subgroup of the Poincare group.

One of the advantages of light-front quantum mechanics is that it is possible to realize exact rotational covariance for system of a finite number of degrees of freedom. The way that this is done is to start with the non-interacting generators of the full Poincaré group, which are sums of single-particle generators, construct the kinematic invariant mass operator, the three kinematic generators of translations tangent to the light-front, the three kinematic light-front boost generators and the three components of the light-front spin operator. The generators are well-defined functions of these operators given by (1) and $P^- = (\vec{P}_{\perp}^2 + M^2)/P^+$. Interactions that commute with all of these operators except the kinematic mass are added to the kinematic mass operator to construct a dynamical mass operator. Using this mass operator in (1) and the expression for $P^-$ gives a set of dynamical Poincare generators with a light-front kinematic subgroup.

A complete set of irreducible eigenstates can be found by diagonalizing the interacting mass operator in a basis of simultaneous eigenstates of the light-front components of the kinematic momenta, the kinematic mass, the kinematic spin and the projection of the kinematic spin on the ${\hat{n}}$ axis. This is equivalent to solving the center-of-mass Schrödinger equation in non-relativistic quantum mechanics. The resulting mass eigenstates transform irreducibly under the action of the Poincare group. These irreducible representations define the dynamical representation of the Poincare group on the Hilbert space.

This representation fails to satisfy cluster properties, but this can be restored using a front-form generalization of the recursive construction given by Sokolov.

== Infinite momentum frame ==
The infinite momentum frame (IMF) was originally introduced to provide a physical interpretationof the Bjorken variable $x_{bj} = \frac{Q^2}{2 M\nu}$ measured in deep inelastic lepton-proton scattering $\ell p \to \ell^\prime X$ in Feynman's parton model. (Here $Q^2=-q^2$ is the square of the spacelike momentum transfer imparted by the lepton and $\nu =E_\ell-E_{\ell^\prime}$ is the energy transferred in the proton's rest frame.) If one considers a hypothetical Lorentz frame where the observer is moving at infinite momentum, $P \to \infty$, in the negative $\hat z$ direction, then $x_{bj}$ can be interpreted as the longitudinal momentum fraction $x = \frac{k^z}{P^z}$ carried by the struck quark (or "parton") in the incoming fast moving proton. The structure function of the proton measured in the experiment is then given by the square of its instant-form wave function boosted to infinite momentum.

Formally, there is a simple connection between the Hamiltonian formulation of quantum field theories quantized at fixed time $t$ (the "instant form" ) where the observer is moving at infinite momentum and light-front Hamiltonian theory quantized at fixed light-front time $\tau= t+z/c$ (the "front form"). A typical energy denominator in the instant-form is ${1/ [E_{initial} - E_{intermediate}+ i \epsilon]}$ where $E_{intermediate} = \sum_j E_j = \sum_j\sqrt{m^2+ {\vec k}^2_j}$ is the sum of energies of the particles in the intermediate state. In the IMF, where the observer moves at high momentum $P$ in the negative $\hat z$ direction, the leading terms in $P$ cancel, and the energy denominator becomes $2P / [ \mathcal{M}^2- \sum_j \big[{k^2_\perp + \frac{m^2}{x_i}}\big]_j + i \epsilon]$ where $\mathcal{M}^2$ is invariant mass squared of the initial state. Thus, by keeping the terms in $\frac{1}{P}$ in the instant form, one recovers the energy denominator which appears in light-front Hamiltonian theory. This correspondence has a physical meaning: measurements made by an observer moving at infinite momentum is analogous to making observations approaching the speed of light—thus matching to the front form where measurements are made along the front of a light wave. An example of an application to quantum electrodynamics can be found in the work of Brodsky, Roskies and Suaya.

The vacuum state in the instant form defined at fixed $t$ is acausal and infinitely complicated. For example, in quantum electrodynamics, bubble graphs of all orders, starting with the $e^+ e^- \gamma$ intermediate state, appear in the ground state vacuum; however, as shown by Weinberg, such vacuum graphs are frame-dependent and formally vanish by powers of $1/ P^2$ as the observer moves at $P \to \infty$. Thus, one can again match the instant form to the front-form formulation where such vacuum loop diagrams do not appear in the QED ground state. This is because the $+$ momentum of each constituent is positive, but must sum to zero in the vacuum state since the $+$momenta are conserved. However, unlike the instant form, no dynamical boosts are required, and the front form formulation is causal and frame-independent. The infinite momentum frame formalism is useful as an intuitive tool; however, the limit $P\to \infty$ is not a rigorous limit, and the need to boost the instant-form wave function introduces complexities.

== Covariant formulation ==
In light-front coordinates, $x^+=ct+z$, $x^-=ct-z$, the spatial coordinates $x,y,z$ do not enter symmetrically: the coordinate $z$ is distinguished, whereas $x$ and $y$ do not appear at all. This non-covariant definition destroys the spatial symmetry that, in its turn, results in a few difficulties related to the fact that some transformation of the reference frame may change the orientation of the light-front plane. That is, the transformations of the reference frame and variation of orientation of the light-front plane are not decoupled from each other. Since the wave function depends dynamically on the orientation of the plane where it is defined, under these transformations the light-front wave function is transformed by dynamical operators (depending on the interaction). Therefore, in general, one should know the interaction to go from given reference frame to the new one. The loss of symmetry between the coordinates $z$ and $x,y$ complicates also the construction of the states with definite angular momentum since the latter is just a property of the wave function relative to the rotations which affects all the coordinates $x,y,z$.

To overcome this inconvenience, there was developed the explicitly covariant version of light-front quantization (reviewed by Carbonell et al.), in which the state vector is defined on the light-front plane of general orientation: $\omega\cdot x = \omega_0 ct-\vec{\omega}\cdot \vec{x} = \omega_0 t- \omega_x x- \omega_y y- \omega_z z=0$ (instead of $ct+z=0$), where $x=(ct,\vec{x})$ is a four-dimensional vector in the four-dimensional space-time and $\omega=(\omega_0,\vec{\omega})$ is also a four-dimensional vector with the property $\omega^2=\omega_0^2-\vec{\omega}^2=0$. In the particular case $\omega=(1/c,0,0,-1/c)$ we come back to the standard construction. In the explicitly covariant formulation the transformation of the reference frame and the change of orientation of the light-front plane are decoupled. All the rotations and the Lorentz transformations are purely kinematical (they do not require knowledge of the interaction), whereas the (dynamical) dependence on the orientation of the light-front plane is covariantly parametrized by the wave function dependence on the four-vector $\omega$.

There were formulated the rules of graph techniques which, for a given Lagrangian, allow to calculate the perturbative decomposition of the state vector evolving in the light-front time $\sigma=\omega\cdot x$ (in contrast to the evolution in the direction $x^+$ or $t$). For the instant form of dynamics, these rules were first developed by Kadyshevsky. By these rules, the light-front amplitudes are represented as the integrals over the momenta of particles in intermediate states. These integrals are three-dimensional, and all the four-momenta $k_i$ are on the corresponding mass shells $k_i^2=m_i^2$, in contrast to the Feynman rules containing four-dimensional integrals over the off-mass-shell momenta. However, the calculated light-front amplitudes, being on the mass shell, are in general the off-energy-shell amplitudes. This means that the on-mass-shell four-momenta, which these amplitudes depend on, are not conserved in the direction $x^-$ (or, in general, in the direction $\omega$). The off-energy shell amplitudes do not coincide with the Feynman amplitudes, and they depend on the orientation of the light-front plane. In the covariant formulation, this dependence is explicit: the amplitudes are functions of $\omega$. This allows one to apply to them in full measure the well known techniques developed for the covariant Feynman amplitudes (constructing the invariant variables, similar to the Mandelstam variables, on which the amplitudes depend; the decompositions, in the case of particles with spins, in invariant amplitudes; extracting electromagnetic form factors; etc.). The irreducible off-energy-shell amplitudes serve as the kernels of equations for the light-front wave functions. The latter ones are found from these equations and used to analyze hadrons and nuclei.

For spinless particles, and in the particular case of $\omega=(1/c,0,0,-1/c)$, the amplitudes found by the rules of covariant graph techniques, after replacement of variables, are reduced to the amplitudes given by the Weinberg rules in the infinite momentum frame. The dependence on orientation of the light-front plane manifests itself in the dependence of the off-energy-shell Weinberg amplitudes on the variables $\vec{k}_{\perp i}, x_i$ taken separately but not in some particular combinations like the Mandelstam variables $s,t$.

On the energy shell, the amplitudes do not depend on the four-vector $\omega$ determining orientation of the corresponding light-front plane. These on-energy-shell amplitudes coincide with the on-mass-shell amplitudes given by the Feynman rules. However, the dependence on $\omega$ can survive because of approximations.

== Angular momentum ==
The covariant formulation is especially useful for constructing the states with definite angular momentum. In this construction, the four-vector $\omega$ participates on equal footing with other four-momenta, and, therefore, the main part of this problem is reduced to the well known one. For example, as is well known, the wave function of a non-relativistic system, consisting of two spinless particles with the relative momentum $\vec{k}$ and with total angular momentum $l$, is proportional to the spherical function $Y_{lm}(\hat{\vec{k}})$: $\psi_{lm}(\vec{k})=f(k)Y_{lm}(\hat{k})$, where $\hat{k}=\vec{k}/k$ and $f(k)$ is a function depending on the modulus $k=|\vec{k}|$. The angular momentum operator reads: $\vec{J}=-i[\vec{k}\times \partial \vec{k}]$. Then the wave function of a relativistic system in the covariant formulation of light-front dynamics obtains the similar form:

| $\psi_{lm}(\vec{k},\hat{n})=f_1(k, \vec{k}\cdot\hat{n})Y_{lm}(\hat{k})+ f_2(k,\vec{k}\cdot\hat{n})Y_{lm}(\hat{n}),$ | 7 |

where $\hat{n}=\vec{\omega}/|\vec{\omega}|$ and $f_{1,2}(k,\vec{k}\cdot\hat{n})$ are functions depending, in addition to $k$, on the scalar product $\vec{k}\cdot\hat{n}$. The variables $k$, $\vec{k}\cdot\hat{n}$ are invariant not only under rotations of the vectors $\vec{k}$, $\hat{n}$ but also under rotations and the Lorentz transformations of initial four-vectors $k$, $\omega$. The second contribution $\propto Y_{lm}(\hat{n})$ means that the operator of the total angular momentum in explicitly covariant light-front dynamics obtains an additional term: $\vec{J}=-i[\vec{k}\times \partial \vec{k}] -i[\hat{n}\times \partial \hat{n}]$. For non-zero spin particles this operator obtains the contribution of the spin operators:

$\vec{J}=-i[\vec{k}\times \partial \vec{k}] -i[\hat{n}\times \partial \hat{n}]+ \vec{s}_1+\vec{s}_2.$

The fact that the transformations changing the orientation of the light-front plane are dynamical (the corresponding generators of the Poincare group contain interaction) manifests itself in the dependence of the coefficients $f_{1,2}$ on the scalar product $\vec{k}\cdot\hat{n}$ varying when the orientation of the unit vector $\hat{n}$ changes (for fixed $\vec{k}$). This dependence (together with the dependence on $k$) is found from the dynamical equation for the wave function.

A peculiarity of this construction is in the fact that there exists the operator $A=(\hat{n}\cdot \vec{J})^2$ which commutes both with the Hamiltonian and with $\vec{J}^2, J_z$. Then the states are labeled also by the eigenvalue $a$ of the operator $A$: $\psi=\psi_{lma}(\vec{k},\hat{n})$. For given angular momentum $l$, there are $l+1$ such the states. All of them are degenerate, i.e. belong to the same mass (if we do not make an approximation). However, the wave function should also satisfy the so-called angular condition After satisfying it, the solution obtains the form of a unique superposition of the states $\psi_{lma}(\vec{k},\hat{n})$ with different eigenvalues $a$.

The extra contribution $-i[\hat{n}\times \partial \hat{n}]$ in the light-front angular momentum operator increases the number of spin components in the light-front wave function. For example, the non-relativistic deuteron wave function is determined by two components ($S$- and $D$-waves). Whereas, the relativistic light-front deuteron wave function is determined by six components. These components were calculated in the one-boson exchange model.

== Goals and prospects ==
The central issue for light-front quantization is the rigorous description of hadrons, nuclei, and systems thereof from first principles in QCD. The main goals of the research using light-front dynamics are:

- Evaluation of masses and wave functions of hadrons using the light-front Hamiltonian of QCD.
- The analysis of hadronic and nuclear phenomenology based on fundamental quark and gluon dynamics, taking advantage of the connections between quark-gluon and nuclear many-body methods.
- Understanding of the properties of QCD at finite temperatures and densities, which is relevant for understanding the early universe as well as compact stellar objects.
- Developing predictions for tests at the new and upgraded hadron experimental facilities -- JLAB, LHC, RHIC, J-PARC, GSI(FAIR).
- Analyzing the physics of intense laser fields, including a nonperturbative approach to strong-field QED.
- Providing bottom-up fitness tests for model theories as exemplified in the case of Standard Model.

The nonperturbative analysis of light-front QCD requires the following:

- Continue testing the light-front Hamiltonian approach in simple theories in order to improve our understanding of its peculiarities and treacherous points vis a vis manifestly-covariant quantization methods. This will include work on theories such as Yukawa theory and QED and on theories with unbroken supersymmetry, in order to understand the strengths and limitations of different methods. Much progress has already been made along these lines.
- Construct symmetry-preserving regularization and renormalization schemes for light-front QCD, to include the Pauli–Villars-based method of the St. Petersburg group, Glazek-Wilson similarity renormalization-group procedure for Hamiltonians, Mathiot-Grange test functions, Karmanov-Mathiot-Smirnov realization of sector-dependent renormalization, and determine how to incorporate symmetry breaking in light-front quantization; this is likely to require an analysis of zero modes and in-hadron condensates.
- Develop computer codes which implement the regularization and renormalization schemes. Provide a platform-independent, well-documented core of routines that allow investigators to implement different numerical approximations to field-theoretic eigenvalue problems, including the light-front coupled-cluster method. Consider various quadrature schemes and basis sets, including Discretized Light-Cone Quantization (DLCQ),

finite elements, function expansions, and the complete orthonormal wave functions obtained from AdS/QCD. This will build on the Lanczos-based MPI code developed for nonrelativistic nuclear physics applications and similar codes for Yukawa theory and lower-dimensional supersymmetric Yang—Mills theories.

- Address the problem of computing rigorous bounds on truncation errors, particularly for energy scales where QCD is strongly coupled.

Understand the role of renormalization group methods, asymptotic freedom and spectral properties of $P^+$ in quantifying truncation errors.

- Solve for hadronic masses and wave functions. Use these wave functions to compute form factors, generalized parton distributions, scattering amplitudes, and decay rates. Compare with perturbation theory, lattice QCD, and model calculations, using insights from AdS/QCD, where possible. Study the transition to nuclear degrees of freedom, beginning with light nuclei.
- Classify the spectrum with respect to total angular momentum. In equal-time quantization, the three generators of rotations are kinematic, and the analysis of total angular momentum is relatively simple. In light-front quantization, only the generator of rotations around the $z$-axis is kinematic; the other two, of rotations about axes

$x$ and $y$, are dynamical. To solve the angular momentum classification problem, the eigenstates and spectra of the sum of squares of these generators must be constructed. This is the price to pay for having more kinematical generators than in equal-time quantization, where all three boosts are dynamical. In light-front quantization, the boost along $z$ is kinematic, and this greatly simplifies the calculation of matrix elements that involve boosts, such as the ones needed to calculate form factors. The relation to covariant Bethe–Salpeter approaches projected on the light-front may help in understanding the angular momentum issue and its relationship to the Fock-space truncation of the light-front Hamiltonian. Model-independent constraints from the general angular condition, which must be satisfied by the light-front helicity amplitudes, should also be explored. The contribution from the zero mode appears necessary for the hadron form factors to satisfy angular momentum conservation, as expressed by the angular condition. The relation to light-front quantum mechanics, where it is possible to exactly realize full rotational covariance and construct explicit representations of the dynamical rotation generators, should also be investigated.

- Explore the AdS/QCD correspondence and light front holography.

The approximate duality in the limit of massless quarks motivates few-body analyses of meson and baryon spectra based on a one-dimensional light-front Schrödinger equation in terms of the modified transverse coordinate $\zeta$. Models that extend the approach to massive quarks have been proposed, but a more fundamental understanding within QCD is needed. The nonzero quark masses introduce a non-trivial dependence on the longitudinal momentum, and thereby highlight the need to understand the representation of rotational symmetry within the formalism. Exploring AdS/QCD wave functions as part of a physically motivated Fock-space basis set to diagonalize the LFQCD Hamiltonian should shed light on both issues. The complementary Ehrenfest interpretation can be used to introduce effective degrees of freedom such as diquarks in baryons.

- Develop numerical methods/computer codes to directly evaluate the partition function (viz. thermodynamic potential) as the basic thermodynamic quantity. Compare to lattice QCD, where applicable, and focus on a finite chemical potential, where reliable lattice QCD results are presently available only at very small (net) quark densities. There is also an opportunity for use of light-front AdS/QCD to explore non-equilibrium phenomena such as transport properties during the very early state of a heavy ion collision. Light-front AdS/QCD opens the possibility to investigate hadron formation in such a non-equilibrated strongly coupled quark-gluon plasma.
- Develop a light-front approach to the neutrino oscillation experiments possible at Fermilab and elsewhere, with the goal of reducing the energy spread of the neutrino-generating hadronic sources, so that the three-energy-slits interference picture of the oscillation pattern can be resolved and the front form of Hamiltonian dynamics utilized in providing the foundation for qualitatively new (treating the vacuum differently) studies of neutrino mass generation mechanisms.
- If the renormalization group procedure for effective particles (RGPEP) does allow one to study intrinsic charm, bottom, and glue in a systematically renormalized and convergent light-front Fock-space expansion, one might consider a host of new experimental studies of production processes using the intrinsic components that are not included in the calculations based on gluon and quark splitting functions.

== See also ==
- Light-front computational methods
- Light-front quantization applications
- Quantum field theories
- Quantum chromodynamics
- Quantum electrodynamics
- Light-front holography
