= Light-front computational methods =

Technique in computational quantum field theory

The light cone of special relativity. Light-front quantization uses light-front (or light-cone) coordinates to select an initial surface that is tangential to the light cone. Equal-time quantization uses an initial surface that is horizontal, labeled here as the "hypersurface of the present".

The light-front quantization of quantum field theories provides a useful alternative to ordinary equal-time quantization. In particular, it can lead to a relativistic description of bound systems in terms of quantum-mechanical wave functions. The quantization is based on the choice of light-front coordinates, where $x^+\equiv ct+z$ plays the role of time and the corresponding spatial coordinate is $x^-\equiv ct-z$. Here, $t$ is the ordinary time, $z$ is one Cartesian coordinate, and $c$ is the speed of light. The other two Cartesian coordinates, $x$ and $y$, are untouched and often called transverse or perpendicular, denoted by symbols of the type $\vec x_\perp = (x,y)$. The choice of the frame of reference where the time $t$ and $z$-axis are defined can be left unspecified in an exactly soluble relativistic theory, but in practical calculations some choices may be more suitable than others.

The solution of the LFQCD Hamiltonian eigenvalue equation will utilize the available mathematical methods of quantum mechanics and contribute to the development of advanced computing techniques for large quantum systems, including nuclei. For example, in the discretized light-cone quantization method (DLCQ), periodic conditions are introduced such that momenta are discretized and the size of the Fock space is limited without destroying Lorentz invariance. Solving a quantum field theory is then reduced to diagonalizing a large sparse Hermitian matrix. The DLCQ method has been successfully used to obtain the complete spectrum and light-front wave functions in numerous model quantum field theories such as QCD with one or two space dimensions for any number of flavors and quark masses. An extension of this method to supersymmetric theories, SDLCQ, takes advantage of the fact that the light-front Hamiltonian can be factorized as a product of raising and lowering ladder operators. SDLCQ has provided new insights into a number of supersymmetric theories including direct numerical evidence for a supergravity/super-Yang–Mills duality conjectured by Maldacena.

It is convenient to work in a Fock basis $\{|n:p_i^+,\vec{p}_{\perp i}\rangle\}$ where the light-front momenta $\mathcal{P}^+$ and $\vec\mathcal{P}_\perp$ are diagonal. The state $|\underline{P}\rangle$ is given by an expansion

$$|\underline{P}\rangle=\sum_n\int [dx]_n\,[d^2k_\perp]_n\, \psi_n(x,\vec{k}_\perp)|n:xP^+,x\vec{P}_\perp+\vec{k}_\perp\rangle\,,$$

with

$$[dx]_n=4\pi\delta(1-\sum_{i=1}^nx_i)  \prod_{i=1}^n\frac{dx_i}{4\pi\sqrt{x_i}}\,,\;\;\; [d^2k_\perp]_n=4\pi^2\delta(\sum_{i=1}^n\vec{k}_{\perp i})   \prod_{i=1}^n\frac{d^2k_{\perp i}}{4\pi^2}\,.$$

$\psi_n$ is interpreted as the wave function of the contribution from states with $n$ particles. The eigenvalue problem $\mathcal{P}^-|\underline{P}\rangle=\frac{M^2+P_\perp^2}{P^+}|\underline{P}\rangle$ is a set of coupled integral equations for these wave functions. Although the notation as presented supports only one particle type, the generalization to more than one is trivial.

== Discrete light-cone quantization ==
A systematic approach to discretization of the eigenvalue problem is the DLCQ method originally suggested by Pauli and Brodsky. In essence it is the replacement of integrals by trapezoidal approximations, with equally-spaced intervals in the longitudinal and transverse momenta

$$p^+\rightarrow\frac{2\pi}{L}n\,,\;\; \vec{p}_\perp\rightarrow(\frac{\pi}{L_\perp}n_x,\frac{\pi}{L_\perp}n_y),$$

corresponding to periodic boundary conditions on the intervals $-L<x^-<L$ and $-L_\perp<x,y<L_\perp$. The length scales $L$ and $L_\perp$ determine the resolution of the calculation. Because the plus component of momentum is always positive, the limit $L\rightarrow\infty$ can be exchanged for a limit in terms of the integer resolution $K\equiv\frac{L}{2\pi}P^+$. The combination of momentum components that defines $H_{\rm LC}=P^+\mathcal{P}^-$ is then independent of $L$. The longitudinal momentum fractions $x_i\equiv p_i^+/P^+$ become ratios of integers $n_i/K$. Because the $n_i$ are all positive, DLCQ automatically limits the number of particles to be no more than $K$. When a limit on transverse momentum is supplied via a chosen cutoff, a finite matrix problem is obtained; however, the matrix may be too large for present numerical techniques. An explicit truncation in particle number, the light-cone equivalent of the Tamm—Dancoff approximation, can then be made. Large basis sizes require special techniques for matrix diagonalization; the one typically used is the Lanczos algorithm. For the case of one space dimension, one can readily solve for the hadron spectrum of QCD for any quark masses and colors.

Most DLCQ calculations are done without zero modes. However, in principle, any DLCQ basis with periodic boundary conditions may include them as constrained modes, dependent on the other modes with nonzero momentum. The constraint comes from the spatial average of the Euler–Lagrange equation for the field. This constraint equation can be difficult to solve, even for the simplest theories. However, an approximate solution can be found, consistent with the underlying approximations of the DLCQ method itself. This solution generates the effective zero-mode interactions for the light-front Hamiltonian.

Calculations in the massive sector that are done without zero modes will usually yield the correct answer. The neglect of zero modes merely worsens the convergence. One exception is that of cubic scalar theories, where the spectrum extends to minus infinity. A DLCQ calculation without zero modes will require careful extrapolation to detect this infinity, whereas a calculation that includes zero modes yields the correct result immediately. The zero modes are avoided if one uses antiperiodic boundary conditions.

== Supersymmetric discrete light-cone quantization ==
The supersymmetric form of DLCQ (SDLCQ) is specifically designed to maintain supersymmetry in the discrete approximation. Ordinary DLCQ violates supersymmetry by terms that do not survive the continuum limit. The SDLCQ construction discretizes the supercharge $Q^-$ and defines the Hamiltonian $\mathcal{P}^-$ by the superalgebra relation $\mathcal{P}^-=\{Q^-,Q^-\}/2\sqrt{2}$. The range of transverse momentum is limited by a simple cutoff in the momentum value. Effects of zero modes are expected to cancel.

In addition to calculations of spectra, this technique can be used to calculate expectation values. One such quantity, a correlator $\langle T^{++}(x) T^{++}(y)\rangle$ of the stress energy tensor, has been computed as a test of a Maldacena conjecture. A very efficient Lanczos-based method was developed for this calculation. The most recent results provide direct evidence for the conjecture.

== Transverse lattice ==
The transverse lattice method brings together two powerful ideas in quantum field theory: light-front Hamiltonian quantization and lattice gauge theory. Lattice gauge theory is a very popular means of regulating for calculation the gauge theories that describe all visible matter in the universe; in particular, it manifestly demonstrates the linear confinement of QCD that holds quarks and gluons inside the protons and neutrons of the atomic nucleus. In general, to obtain solutions of a quantum field theory, with its continuously infinite degrees of freedom, one must put kinematical cutoffs or other restrictions on the space of quantum states. To remove the errors this introduces, one may then extrapolate these cutoffs, provided a continuum limit exists, and/or renormalize observables to account for degrees of freedom above the cutoff. For the purposes of Hamiltonian quantization, one must have a continuous time direction. In the case of light-front Hamiltonian quantization, in addition to continuous light-front time $x^+$, it is necessary to keep the $x^-$ direction continuous if one wants to preserve the manifest Lorentz boost invariance in one direction and to include small light-front energies $p^-$. Therefore, at most one can impose a lattice cutoff on the remaining transverse spatial directions. Such a transverse lattice gauge theory was first suggested by Bardeen and Pearson in 1976.

Most practical calculations performed with transverse lattice gauge theory have utilized one further ingredient: the color-dielectric expansion. A dielectric formulation is one in which the gauge group elements, whose generators are the gluon fields in the case of QCD, are replaced by collective (smeared, blocked, etc.) variables which represent an average over their fluctuations on short distance scales. These dielectric variables are massive, carry color, and form an effective gauge field theory with classical action minimized at zero field, meaning that color flux is expelled from the vacuum at the classical level. This maintains the triviality of the light-front vacuum structure, but arises only for a low momentum cutoff on the effective theory (corresponding to transverse lattice spacings of order 1/2 fm in QCD). As a result, the effective cutoff Hamiltonian is initially poorly constrained. The color-dielectric expansion, together with requirements of Lorentz symmetry restoration, has nevertheless been successfully used to organize the interactions in the Hamiltonian in a way suitable for practical solution. The most accurate spectrum of large-$N_c$ glueballs has been obtained in this way, and as well as pion light-front wave functions in agreement with a range of experimental data.

== Basis Light-Front Quantization ==
The basis light-front quantization (BLFQ) approach uses expansions in products of single-particle basis functions to represent the Fock-state wave functions. Typically, the longitudinal ($x^-$) dependence is represented in the DLCQ basis of plane waves, and the transverse dependence is represented by two-dimensional harmonic oscillator functions. The latter are ideal for applications to confining cavities and are consistent with light-front holographic QCD. The use of products of single particle basis functions is also convenient for incorporation of boson and fermion statistics, because the products are readily (anti)symmetrized. By employing two-dimensional basis functions with rotational symmetry about the longitudinal direction (where the harmonic oscillator functions serve as an example), one preserves the total angular momentum projection quantum number which facilitates determination of the total angular momentum of the mass eigenstates. For applications without an external cavity, where transverse momentum is conserved, a Lagrange multiplier method is used to separate the relative transverse motion from the total system's motion.

The first application of BLFQ to QED solved for the electron in a two-dimensional transverse confining cavity and showed how the anomalous magnetic moment behaved as a function of the strength of the cavity. The second application of BLFQ to QED solved for the electron's anomalous magnetic moment in free space and demonstrated agreement with the Schwinger moment in the appropriate limit.

The extension of BLFQ to the time-dependent regime, namely, time-dependent BLFQ (tBLFQ) is straightforward and is currently under active development. The goal of tBLFQ is to solve light-front field theory in real-time (with or without time-dependent background fields). The typical application areas include intense lasers (see Light-front quantization#Intense lasers}) and relativistic heavy-ion collisions.

== Light-front coupled-cluster method ==
The light-front coupled cluster (LFCC) method is a particular form of truncation for the infinite coupled system of integral equations for light-front wave functions. The system of equations that comes from the field-theoretic Schrödinger equation also requires regularization, to make the integral operators finite. The traditional Fock-space truncation of the system, where the allowed number of particles is limited, typically disrupts the regularization by removing infinite parts that would otherwise cancel against parts that are retained. Although there are ways to circumvent this, they are not completely satisfactory.

The LFCC method avoids these difficulties by truncating the set of equations in a very different way. Instead of truncating the number of particles, it truncates the way in which wave functions are related to each other; the wave functions of higher Fock states are determined by the lower-state wave functions and the exponentiation of an operator $T$. Specifically, the eigenstate is written in the form $\sqrt{Z}e^T|\phi\rangle$, where $\sqrt{Z}$ is a normalization factor and $|\phi\rangle$ is a state with the minimal number of constituents. The operator $T$ increases particle number and conserves all relevant quantum numbers, including light-front momentum. This is in principle exact but also still infinite, because $T$ can have an infinite number of terms. Zero modes can be included by inclusion of their creation as terms in $T$; this generates a nontrivial vacuum as a generalized coherent state of zero modes.

The truncation made is a truncation of $T$. The original eigenvalue problem becomes a finite-sized eigenvalue problem for the valence state $|\phi\rangle$, combined with auxiliary equations for the terms retained in $T$:

$$P_v\overline{\mathcal{P}^-}|\phi\rangle=\frac{M^2+P_\perp^2}{P^+}|\phi\rangle, \;\;\;\; (1-P_v)\overline{\mathcal{P}^-}|\phi\rangle=0.$$

Here $P_v$ is a projection onto the valence sector, and $\overline{\mathcal{P}^-}\equiv e^{-T}\mathcal{P}^- e^T$ is the LFCC effective Hamiltonian. The projection $1-P_v$ is truncated to provide just enough auxiliary equations to determine the functions in the truncated $T$ operator. The effective Hamiltonian is computed from its Baker–Hausdorff expansion $\overline{\mathcal{P}^-}=\mathcal{P}^-+[\mathcal{P}^-,T]+\frac12[[\mathcal{P}^-,T],T]+\cdots$, which can be terminated at the point where more particles are being created than are kept by the truncated projection $1-P_v$. The use of the exponential of $T$ rather than some other function is convenient, not only because of the Baker–Hausdorff expansion but more generally because it is invertible; in principle, other functions could be used and would also provide an exact representation until a truncation is made.

The truncation of $T$ can be handled systematically. Terms can be classified by the number of annihilated constituents and the net increase in particle number. For example, in QCD the lowest-order contributions annihilate one particle and increase the total by one. These are one-gluon emission from a quark, quark pair creation from one gluon, and gluon pair creation from one gluon. Each involves a function of relative momentum for the transition from one to two particles. Higher order terms annihilate more particles and/or increase the total by more than one. These provide additional contributions to higher-order wave functions and even to low-order wave functions for more complicated valence states. For example, the wave function for the $|q\bar{q}g\rangle$ Fock state of a meson can have a contribution from a term in $T$ that annihilates a $q\bar{q}$ pair and creates a pair plus a gluon, when this acts on the meson valence state $|q\bar{q}\rangle$.

The mathematics of the LFCC method has its origin in the many-body coupled cluster method used in nuclear physics and quantum chemistry. The physics is, however, quite different. The many-body method works with a state of a large number of particles and uses the exponentiation of $T$ to build in correlations of excitations to higher single-particle states; the particle number does not change. The LFCC method starts from a small number of constituents in a valence state and uses $e^T$ to build states with more particles; the method of solution of the valence-state eigenvalue problem is left unspecified.

The computation of physical observables from matrix elements of operators requires some care. Direct computation would require an infinite sum over Fock space. One can instead borrow from the many-body coupled cluster method a construction that computes expectation values from right and left eigenstates. This construction can be extended to include off-diagonal matrix elements and gauge projections. Physical quantities can then be computed from the right and left LFCC eigenstates.

== Renormalization group ==
Renormalization concepts, especially the renormalization group methods in quantum theories and statistical mechanics, have a long history and a very broad scope. The concepts of renormalization that appear useful in theories quantized in the front form of dynamics are essentially of two types, as in other areas of theoretical physics. The two types of concepts are associated with two types of theoretical tasks involved in applications of a theory. One task is to calculate observables (values of operationally defined quantities) in a theory that is unambiguously defined. The other task is to define a theory unambiguously. This is explained below.

Since the front form of dynamics aims at explaining hadrons as bound states of quarks and gluons, and the binding mechanism is not describable using perturbation theory, the definition of a theory needed in this case cannot be limited to perturbative expansions. For example, it is not sufficient to construct a theory using regularization of loop integrals order-by-order and correspondingly redefining the masses, coupling constants, and field normalization constants also order-by-order. In other words, one needs to design the Minkowski space-time formulation of a relativistic theory that is not based on any a priori perturbative scheme. The front form of Hamiltonian dynamics is perceived by many researchers as the most suitable framework for this purpose among the known options.

The desired definition of a relativistic theory involves calculations of as many observables as one must use in order to fix all the parameters that appear in the theory. The relationship between the parameters and observables may depend on the number of degrees of freedom that are included in the theory.

For example, consider virtual particles in a candidate formulation of the theory. Formally, special relativity requires that the range of momenta of the particles is infinite because one can change the momentum of a particle by an arbitrary amount through a change of frame of reference. If the formulation is not to distinguish any inertial frame of reference, the particles must be allowed to carry any value of momentum. Since the quantum field modes corresponding to particles with different momenta form different degrees of freedom, the requirement of including infinitely many values of momentum means that one requires the theory to involve infinitely many degrees of freedom. But for mathematical reasons, being forced to use computers for sufficiently precise calculations, one has to work with a finite number of degrees of freedom. One must limit the momentum range by some cutoff.

Setting up a theory with a finite cutoff for mathematical reasons, one hopes that the cutoff can be made sufficiently large to avoid its appearance in observables of physical interest, but in local quantum field theories that are of interest in hadronic physics the situation is not that simple. Namely, particles of different momenta are coupled through the dynamics in a nontrivial way, and the calculations aiming at predicting observables yield results that depend on the cutoffs. Moreover, they do so in a diverging fashion.

There may be more cutoff parameters than just for momentum. For example, one may assume that the volume of space is limited, which would interfere with translation invariance of a theory, or assume that the number of virtual particles is limited, which would interfere with the assumption that every virtual particle may split into more virtual particles. All such restrictions lead to a set of cutoffs that becomes a part of a definition of a theory.

Consequently, every result of a calculation for any observable $X_{\rm observable}(\mu)$ characterized by its physical scale $\mu$ has the form of a function of the set of parameters of the theory, $p$, the set of cutoffs, say $\Lambda$, and the scale $\mu$. Thus, the results take the form

$$X_{\rm observable}(\mu) = X_{\rm theory}(p, \Lambda, \mu) \, .$$

However, experiments provide values of observables that characterize natural processes irrespective of the cutoffs in a theory used to explain them. If the cutoffs do not describe properties of nature and are introduced merely for making a theory computable, one needs to understand how the dependence on $\Lambda$ may drop out from $X_{\rm theory}(p,\Lambda, \mu)$. The cutoffs may also reflect some natural features of a physical system at hand, such as in the model case of an ultraviolet cutoff on the wave vectors of sound waves in a crystal due to the spacing of atoms in the crystal lattice. The natural cutoffs may be of enormous size in comparison to the scale $\mu$. Then, one faces the question of how it happens in the theory that its results for observables at scale $\mu$ are not also of the enormous size of the cutoff and, if they are not, then how they depend on the scale $\mu$.

The two types of concepts of renormalization mentioned above are associated with the following two questions:

- How should the parameters $p$ depend on the cutoffs $\Lambda$ so that all observables $X(p,\Lambda,\mu)$ of physical interest do not depend on $\Lambda$, including the case where one removes the cutoffs by sending them formally to infinity?
- What is the required set of parameters $p$?

The renormalization group concept associated with the first question predates the concept associated with the second question. Certainly, if one were in possession of a good answer to the second question, the first question could also be answered. In the absence of a good answer to the second question, one may wonder why any specific choice of parameters and their cutoff dependence could secure cutoff independence of all observables $X(p,\Lambda,\mu)$ with finite scales $\mu$.

The renormalization group concept associated with the first question above relies on the circumstance that some finite set $p(\Lambda)$ yields the desired result,

$$X_{\rm observable}(\mu) = \lim_{\Lambda \rightarrow \infty} X_{\rm theory}[p(\Lambda), \Lambda, \mu] \, .$$

In this way of thinking, one can expect that in a theory with $n$ parameters a calculation of $n$ observables at some scale $\mu$ is sufficient to fix all parameters as functions of $\Lambda$. So, one may hope that there exists a collection of $n$ effective parameters at scale $\mu$, corresponding to $n$ observables at scale $\mu$, that are sufficient to parametrize the theory in such a way that predictions expressed in terms of these parameters are free from dependence on $\Lambda$. Since the scale $\mu$ is arbitrary, a whole family of such $n$-parameter sets labeled by $\mu$ should exist, and every member of that family corresponds to the same physics. Moving from one such family to another by changing one value of $\mu$ to another is described as action of the renormalization group. The word group is justified because the group axioms are satisfied: two such changes form another such change, one can invert a change, etc.

The question remains, however, why fixing the cutoff dependence of $n$ parameters $p$ on $\Lambda$, using $n$ conditions that $n$ selected observables do not depend on $\Lambda$, is good enough to make all observables in the physical range of $\mu$ not depend on $\Lambda$. In some theories such a miracle may happen but in others it may not. The ones where it happens are called renormalizable, because one can normalize the parameters properly to obtain cutoff independent results.

Typically, the set $p(\Lambda)$ is established using perturbative calculations that are combined with models for description of nonperturbative effects. For example, perturbative QCD diagrams for quarks and gluons are combined with the parton models for description of binding of quarks and gluons into hadrons. The set of parameters $p(\Lambda)$ includes cutoff dependent masses, charges and field normalization constants. The predictive power of a theory set up this way relies on the circumstance that the required set of parameters is relatively small. The regularization is designed order-by-order so that as many formal symmetries as possible of a local theory are preserved and employed in calculations, as in the dimensional regularization of Feynman diagrams. The claim that the set of parameters $p(\Lambda)$ leads to finite, cutoff independent limits for all observables is qualified by the need to use some form of perturbation theory and inclusion of model assumptions concerning bound states.

The renormalization group concept associated with the second question above is conceived to explain how it may be so that the concept of renormalization group associated with the first question can make sense, instead of being at best a successful recipe to deal with divergences in perturbative calculations. Namely, to answer the second question, one designs a calculation (see below) that identifies the required set of parameters to define the theory, the starting point being some specific initial assumption, such as some local Lagrangian density which is a function of field variables and needs to be modified by including all the required parameters. Once the required set of parameters is known, one can establish a set of observables that are sufficient to define the cutoff dependence of the required set. The observables can have any finite scale $\mu$, and one can use any scale $\mu$ to define the parameters $p(\Lambda)$, up to their finite parts that must be fitted to experiment, including features such as the observed symmetries.

Thus, not only the possibility that a renormalization group of the first type may exist can be understood, but also the alternative situations are found where the set of required cutoff dependent parameters does not have to be finite. Predictive power of latter theories results from known relationships among the required parameters and options to establish all the relevant ones.

The renormalization group concept of the second kind is associated with the nature of the mathematical computation used to discover the set of parameters $p$. In its essence, the calculation starts with some specific form of a theory with cutoff $\Lambda$ and derives a corresponding theory with a smaller cutoff, in the sense of more restrictive, say $\Lambda/2$. After re-parameterization using the cutoff as a unit, one obtains a new theory of similar type but with new terms. This means that the starting theory with cutoff $\Lambda$ should also contain such new terms for its form to be consistent with the presence of a cutoff. Eventually, one can find a set of terms that reproduces itself up to changes in the coefficients of the required terms. These coefficients evolve with the number of steps one makes, in each and every step reducing the cutoff by factor of two and rescaling variables. One could use other factors than two, but two is convenient.

In summary, one obtains a trajectory of a point in a space of dimension equal to the number of required parameters and motion along the trajectory is described by transformations that form new kind of a group. Different initial points might lead to different trajectories, but if the steps are self-similar and reduce to a multiple action of one and the same transformation, say $T$, one may describe what happens in terms of the features of $T$, called the renormalization group transformation. The transformation $T$ may transform points in the parameter space making some of the parameters decrease, some grow, and some stay unchanged. It may have fixed points, limit cycles, or even lead to chaotic motion.

Suppose that $T$ has a fixed point. If one starts the procedure at this point, an infinitely long sequence of reductions of the cutoff by factors of two changes nothing in the structure of the theory, except the scale of its cutoff. This means that the initial cutoff can be arbitrarily large. Such a theory may possess the symmetries of special relativity, since there is no price to pay for extending the cutoff as required when one wishes to make the Lorentz transformation that yields momenta which exceed the cutoff.

Both concepts of the renormalization group can be considered in quantum theories constructed using the front form of dynamics. The first concept allows one to play with a small set of parameters and seek consistency, which is a useful strategy in perturbation theory if one knows from other approaches what to expect. In particular, one may study new perturbative features that appear in the front form of dynamics, since it differs from the instant form. The main difference is that the front variables $x^-$ (or $p^+$) are considerably different from the transverse variables $x^\perp$ (or $p^\perp$), so that there is no simple rotational symmetry among them. One can also study sufficiently simplified models for which computers can be used to carry out calculations and see if a procedure suggested by perturbation theory may work beyond it. The second concept allows one to address the issue of defining a relativistic theory ab initio without limiting the definition to perturbative expansions. This option is particularly relevant to the issue of describing bound states in QCD. However, to address this issue one needs to overcome certain difficulties that the renormalization group procedures based on the idea of reduction of cutoffs are not capable of easily resolving. To avoid the difficulties, one can employ the similarity renormalization group procedure. Both the difficulties and similarity are explained in the next section.

== Similarity transformations ==
A glimpse of the difficulties of the procedure of reducing a cutoff $\Lambda$ to cutoff $\Lambda/2$ in the front form of Hamiltonian dynamics of strong interactions can be gained by considering the eigenvalue problem for the Hamiltonian $H$,

$$H \psi = E \psi ,$$

where $H = H_0 + H_I$, $H_0$ has a known spectrum and $H_I$ describes the interactions. Let us assume that the eigenstate $\psi$ can be written as a superposition of eigenstates of $H_0$ and let us introduce two projection operators, $P$ and $Q$, such that $P$ projects on eigenstates of $H_0$ with eigenvalues smaller than $\Lambda/2$ and $Q$ projects on eigenstates of $H_0$ with eigenvalues between $\Lambda/2$ and $\Lambda$. The result of projecting the eigenvalue problem for $H$ using $P$ and $Q$ is a set of two coupled equations

$$H_0 Q \psi + Q H_I Q \psi + Q H_I P \psi = E Q \psi \, ,$$
$$H_0 P \psi + P H_I Q \psi + P H_I P \psi = E P \psi \, .$$

The first equation can be used to evaluate $Q \psi$ in terms of $P \psi$,

$$Q \psi = \frac{1}{E - H_0 - Q H_I Q } \ Q H_I P \psi \, .$$

This expression allows one to write an equation for $P \psi$ in the form

$$H_{\rm eff} P \psi = E P\psi \, ,$$

where

$$H_{\rm eff} = H_0 + P H_I P + P H_I Q \frac{ 1}{ E - H_0 - Q H_I Q } Q H_I P .$$

The equation for $P\psi$ appears to resemble an eigenvalue problem for $H_{\rm eff}$. It is valid in a theory with cutoff $\Lambda/2$, but its effective Hamiltonian $H_{\rm eff}$ depends on the unknown eigenvalue $E$. However, if $\Lambda/2$ is much greater than $E$ of interest, one can neglect $E$ in comparison to $QH_0Q$ provided that $QH_IQ$ is small in comparison to $Q H_0 Q$.

In QCD, which is asymptotically free, one indeed has $H_0$ as the dominant term in the energy denominator in $H_{\rm eff}$ for small eigenvalues $E$. In practice, this happens for cutoffs $\Lambda$ so much larger than the smallest eigenvalues $E$ of physical interest that the corresponding eigenvalue problems are too complex for solving them with required precision. Namely, there are still too many degrees of freedom. One needs to reduce cutoffs considerably further. This issue appears in all approaches to the bound state problem in QCD, not only in the front form of the dynamics. Even if interactions are sufficiently small, one faces an additional difficulty with eliminating $Q$-states. Namely, for small interactions one can eliminate the eigenvalue $E$ from a proper effective Hamiltonian in $P$-subspace in favor of eigenvalues of $H_0$. Consequently, the denominators analogous to the one that appears above in $H_{\rm eff}$ only contain differences of eigenvalues of $H_0$, one above $\Lambda/2$ and one below. Unfortunately, such differences can become arbitrarily small near the cutoff $\Lambda/2$, and they generate strong interactions in the effective theory due to the coupling between the states just below and just above the cutoff $\Lambda/2$. This is particularly bothersome when the eigenstates of $H_0$ near the cutoff are highly degenerate and splitting of the bound state problem into parts below and above the cutoff cannot be accomplished through any simple expansion in powers of the coupling constant.

In any case, when one reduces the cutoff $\Lambda$ to $\Lambda/2$, and then $\Lambda/2$ to $\Lambda/4$ and so on, the strength of interaction in QCD Hamiltonians increases and, especially if the interaction is attractive, $Q H_I Q$ can cancel $H_0$ and $E$ cannot be ignored no matter how small it is in comparison to the reduced cutoff. In particular, this difficulty concerns bound states, where interactions must prevent free relative motion of constituents from dominating the scene and a spatially compact systems have to be formed. So far, it appears not possible to precisely eliminate the eigenvalue $E$ from the effective dynamics obtained by projecting on sufficiently low energy eigenstates of $H_0$ to facilitate reliable calculations.

Fortunately, one can use instead a change of basis. Namely, it is possible to define a procedure in which the basis states are rotated in such a way that the matrix elements of $H_I$ vanish between basis states that according to $H_0$ differ in energy by more than a running cutoff, say $\lambda$. The running cutoff is called the energy bandwidth. The name comes from the band-diagonal form of the Hamiltonian matrix in the new basis ordered in energy using $H_0$. Different values of the running cutoff $\lambda$ correspond to using differently rotated basis states. The rotation is designed not to depend at all on the eigenvalues $E$ one wants to compute.

As a result, one obtains in the rotated basis an effective Hamiltonian matrix eigenvalue problem in which the dependence on cutoff $\Lambda$ may manifest itself only in the explicit dependence of matrix elements of the new $H_{\rm eff}$. The two features of similarity that (1) the $\Lambda$-dependence becomes explicit before one tackles the problem of solving the eigenvalue problem for $H_{\rm eff}$ and (2) the effective Hamiltonian with small energy bandwidth may not depend on the eigenvalues one tries to find, allow one to discover in advance the required counterterms to the diverging cutoff dependence. A complete set of counterterms defines the set of parameters required for defining the theory which has a finite energy bandwidth $\lambda$ and no cutoff dependence in the band. In the course of discovering the counterterms and corresponding parameters, one keeps changing the initial Hamiltonian. Eventually, the complete Hamiltonian may have cutoff independent eigenvalues, including bound states.

In the case of the front-form Hamiltonian for QCD, a perturbative version of the similarity renormalization group procedure is outlined by Wilson et al. Further discussion of computational methods stemming from the similarity renormalization group concept is provided in the next section.

== Renormalization group procedure for effective particles ==
The similarity renormalization group procedure, discussed in #Similarity transformations, can be applied to the problem of describing bound states of quarks and gluons using QCD according to the general computational scheme outlined by Wilson et al. and illustrated in a numerically soluble model by Glazek and Wilson. Since these works were completed, the method has been applied to various physical systems using a weak-coupling expansion. More recently, similarity has evolved into a computational tool called the renormalization group procedure for effective particles, or RGPEP. In principle, the RGPEP is now defined without a need to refer to some perturbative expansion. The most recent explanation of the RGPEP is given by Glazek in terms of an elementary and exactly solvable model for relativistic fermions that interact through a mass mixing term of arbitrary strength in their Hamiltonian.

The effective particles can be seen as resulting from a dynamical transformation akin to the Melosh transformation from current to constituent quarks. Namely, the RGPEP transformation changes the bare quanta in a canonical theory to the effective quanta in an equivalent effective theory with a Hamiltonian that has the energy bandwidth $\lambda$; see #Similarity transformations and references therein for an explanation of the band. The transformations that change $\lambda$ form a group.

The effective particles are introduced through a transformation

$$\psi_s = U_s \, \psi_0 \, U_s^\dagger \, ,$$

where $\psi_s$ is a quantum field operator built from creation and annihilation operators for effective particles of size $s \sim 1/\lambda$ and $\psi_0$ is the original quantum field operator built from creation and annihilation operators for point-like bare quanta of a canonical theory. In great brevity, a canonical Hamiltonian density is built from fields $\psi_0$ and the effective Hamiltonian at scale $s$ is built from fields $\psi_s$, but without actually changing the Hamiltonian. Thus,

$$H_s(\psi_s) = H_0(\psi_0) \, ,$$

which means that the same dynamics is expressed in terms of different operators for different values of $s$. The coefficients $c_s$ in the expansion of a Hamiltonian in powers of the field operators $\psi_s$ depend on $s$ and the field operators depend on $s$, but the Hamiltonian is not changing with $s$. The RGPEP provides an equation for the coefficients $c_s$ as functions of $s$.

In principle, if one had solved the RGPEP equation for the front form Hamiltonian of QCD exactly, the eigenvalue problem could be written using effective quarks and gluons corresponding to any $s$. In particular, for $s$ very small, the eigenvalue problem would involve very large numbers of virtual constituents capable of interacting with large momentum transfers up to about the bandwidth $\lambda \sim 1/s$. In contrast, the same eigenvalue problem written in terms of quanta corresponding to a large $s$, comparable with the size of hadrons, is hoped to take the form of a simple equation that resembles the constituent quark models. To demonstrate mathematically that this is precisely what happens in the RGPEP in QCD is a serious challenge.

== Bethe–Salpeter equation ==
The Bethe–Salpeter amplitude, which satisfies the Bethe–Salpeter equation (see the reviews by Nakanishi ), when projected on the light-front plane, results in the light-front wave function. The meaning of the ``light-front projection" is the following. In the coordinate space, the Bethe–Salpeter amplitude is a function of two four-dimensional coordinates $x_{1,2}=(ct_{1,2},\vec{x}_{1,2})$, namely: $\Phi=\Phi(x_1,x_2;p)$, where $p$ is the total four-momentum of the system. In momentum space, it is given by the Fourier transform:

$$\Phi(k_1,k_2;p)=\int d^4x_1 d^4x_2\Phi(x_1,x_2;p)\exp(ik_1 x_1+ik_2 x_2)$$

(the momentum space Bethe–Salpeter amplitude $\Phi(k_1,k_2;p)$ defined in this way includes in itself the delta-function responsible for the momenta conservation $k_1+k_2=p$). The light-front projection means that the arguments $x_1,x_2$ are on the light-front plane, i.e., they are constrained by the condition (in the covariant formulation): $\omega\cdot x_1=\omega\cdot x_2=0$. This is achieved by inserting in the Fourier transform the corresponding delta functions $\delta(\omega\cdot x_{1,2})$:

$$\psi_{LF}\propto\int d^4x_1 d^4x_2\delta(\omega\cdot x_1) \delta(\omega\cdot x_2)\Phi(x_1,x_2;p)\exp(ik_1 x_1+ik_2 x_2).$$

In this way, we can find the light-front wave function $\psi_{LF}$. Applying this formula to the Bethe–Salpeter amplitude with a given total angular momentum, one reproduces the angular momentum structure of the light-front wave function described in Light front quantization#Angular momentum. In particular, projecting the Bethe–Salpeter amplitude corresponding to a system of two spinless particles with the angular momentum $l$, one reproduces the light-front wave function

$$\psi_{lm}(\vec{k},\hat{n})=f_1(k, \vec{k}\cdot\hat{n})Y_{lm}(\hat{k})+ f_2(k,\vec{k}\cdot\hat{n})Y_{lm}(\hat{n}),$$

given in Light front quantization#Angular momentum.

The Bethe–Salpeter amplitude includes the propagators of the external particles, and, therefore, it is singular. It can be represented in the form of the Nakanishi integral through a non-singular function $g(\gamma,z)$:

$\Phi(k,p)=\frac{1}{\sqrt{4\pi}}\int_{-1}^1dz'\int_0^{\infty}d\gamma' \frac{g(\gamma',z')}{\left[\gamma'+m^2 -\frac{1}{4}M^2-k^2-p\cdot k\; z'-i\epsilon\right]^3},$	1

where $k=(k_1-k_2)/2$ is the relative four-momentum. The Nakanishi weight function $g(\gamma,z)$ is found from an equation and has the properties: $g(\gamma,z=\pm 1)=0$, $g(\gamma\to\infty,z)\to 0$. Projecting the Bethe–Salpeter amplitude (1) on the light-front plane, we get the following useful representation for the light-front wave function (see the review by Carbonell and Karmanov):

$$\psi_{LF}(k_\perp,x)=\frac{1}{\sqrt{4\pi}}\int_0^{\infty}\frac{x(1-x)g(\gamma',1-2x)d\gamma'} {\Bigl[\gamma'+k_\perp^2 +m^2-x(1-x)M^2\Bigr]^2}.$$

It turns out that the masses of a two-body system, found from the Bethe–Salpeter equation for $\Phi(k,p)$ and from the light-front equation for $\psi_{LF}(k_\perp,x)$ with the kernel corresponding to the same physical content, say, one-boson exchange (which, however, in the both approaches have very different analytical forms) are very close to each other. The same is true for the electromagnetic form factors This undoubtedly proves the existence of three-body forces, though the contribution of relativistic origin does not exhaust, of course, all the contributions. The same relativistic dynamics should generate four-body forces, etc. Since in nuclei the small binding energies (relative to the nucleon mass) result from cancellations between the kinetic and potentials energies (which are comparable with nucleon mass, and, hence relativistic), the relativistic effects in nuclei are noticeable. Therefore, many-body forces should be taken into account for fine tuning to experimental data.

== Vacuum structure and zero modes ==
One of the advantages of light-front quantization is that the empty state, the so-called perturbative vacuum, is the physical vacuum. The massive states of a theory can then be built on this lowest state without having any contributions from vacuum structure, and the wave functions for these massive states do not contain vacuum contributions. This occurs because each $p_i^+$ is positive, and the interactions of the theory cannot produce particles from the zero-momentum vacuum without violating momentum conservation. There is no need to normal-order the light-front vacuum.

However, certain aspects of some theories are associated with vacuum structure. For example, the Higgs mechanism of the Standard Model relies on spontaneous symmetry breaking in the vacuum of the theory. The usual Higgs vacuum expectation value in the instant form is replaced by $k^+=0$ zero mode analogous to a constant Stark field when one quantizes the Standard model using the front form. Chiral symmetry breaking of quantum chromodynamics is often associated in the instant form with quark and gluon condensates in the QCD vacuum. However, these effects become properties of the hadron wave functions themselves using the front form. This also eliminates the many orders of magnitude conflict between the measured cosmological constant and quantum field theory.

Some aspects of vacuum structure in light-front quantization can be analyzed by studying properties of massive states. In particular, by studying the appearance of degeneracies among the lowest massive states, one can determine the critical coupling strength associated with spontaneous symmetry breaking. One can also use a limiting process, where the analysis begins in equal-time quantization but arrives in light-front coordinates as the limit of some chosen parameter. A much more direct approach is to include modes of zero longitudinal momentum (zero modes) in a calculation of a nontrivial light-front vacuum built from these modes; the Hamiltonian then contains effective interactions that determine the vacuum structure and provide for zero-mode exchange interactions between constituents of massive states.

== See also ==
- Light front quantization
- Light-front quantization applications
- Quantum field theories
- Quantum chromodynamics
- Quantum electrodynamics
- Light-front holography
