= Vacuum catastrophe (disambiguation) =

Vacuum catastrophe can mean:

- the cosmological constant problem in cosmology
- vacuum instability in quantum field theory

== See also ==
- Quantum field theory
- Renormalization
- Vacuum energy
