= Cosmic coincidence problem =

Numerical observation in cosmology

In cosmology, the cosmic coincidence problem is the observation that at the present epoch of the universe's evolution, the energy densities associated with dark matter and dark energy are of the same order of magnitude, leading to their comparable effects on the dynamics of the cosmos. The problem was proposed by Paul Steinhardt during the proceedings of a conference celebrating the 250th anniversary of Princeton University in 1997.

This coincidence is puzzling because these energies have vastly different effects on the universe's expansion—dark matter tends to slow down expansion through gravitational attraction, while dark energy seems to accelerate it. The observed similarity in the magnitudes of these two components' energy densities at this particular epoch in the history of the universe raises questions about whether there might be some underlying physical connection or shared origin between dark matter and dark energy. Indeed, some theories attempt to explain this coincidence by proposing that they are different manifestations of the same fundamental force or field.

== Values ==
According to 2018 Planck analysis of the Lambda-CDM model, the standard model of cosmology, the ratio of the dark energy density to the critical density is about Ω_{Λ} = 0.685, while the ratio of energy density of matter (including ordinary baryonic matter and dark matter) divided by the critical density is about Ω_{m} = 0.315. As the cosmological constant remains constant and matter density decreases with the expansion of the universe, the fact that these two values are of the same order of magnitude means that the ratio Ω_{Λ}/Ω_{m} must be set to a specific infinitesimal value (of the order of 10^{−120}) in the very early universe in order to have the current values today.

== Possible solutions ==
It has been proposed that dark energy and dark matter are related in some way. In quintessence models, an additional quintessence field provides a link between the energy contributions from matter and dark energy.

== See also ==
- Cosmological constant problem
- Flatness problem
- Fine-tuned universe
