= AdS/CMT correspondence =

Correspondence in physics

In theoretical physics, anti-de Sitter/condensed matter theory correspondence is the program to apply string theory to condensed matter theory using the AdS/CFT correspondence.

== Overview ==
Over the decades, experimental condensed matter physicists have discovered a number of exotic states of matter, including superconductors and superfluids. These states are described using the formalism of quantum field theory, but some phenomena are difficult to explain using standard field theoretic techniques. Some condensed matter theorists including Subir Sachdev hope that the AdS/CFT correspondence will make it possible to describe these systems in the language of string theory and learn more about their behavior.

So far some success has been achieved in using string theory methods to describe the transition of a superfluid to an insulator. A superfluid is a system of electrically neutral atoms that flows without any friction. Such systems are often produced in the laboratory using liquid helium, but recently experimentalists have developed new ways of producing artificial superfluids by pouring trillions of cold atoms into a lattice of criss-crossing lasers. These atoms initially behave as a superfluid, but as experimentalists increase the intensity of the lasers, they become less mobile and then suddenly transition to an insulating state. During the transition, the atoms behave in an unusual way. For example, the atoms slow to a halt at a rate that depends on the temperature and on the Planck constant, the fundamental parameter of quantum mechanics, which does not enter into the description of the other phases. This behavior has recently been understood by considering a dual description where properties of the fluid are described in terms of a higher dimensional black hole.

== Criticism ==
Despite many physicists turning towards string-based methods to address problems in condensed matter physics, some theorists working in this area have expressed doubts about whether the AdS/CFT correspondence can provide the tools needed to realistically model real-world systems. In a letter to Physics Today, Nobel laureate Philip W. Anderson wrote

"As a very general problem with the AdS/CFT approach in condensed-matter theory, we can point to those telltale initials "CFT"—conformal field theory. Condensed-matter problems are, in general, neither relativistic nor conformal. Near a quantum critical point, both time and space may be scaling, but even there we still have a preferred coordinate system and, usually, a lattice. There is some evidence of other linear-T phases to the left of the strange metal about which they are welcome to speculate, but again in this case the condensed-matter problem is overdetermined by experimental facts."

== See also ==
- AdS/QCD correspondence
