= Stanley Brodsky =

American physicist

Stanley J. Brodsky (born January 9, 1940) is an American theoretical physicist and emeritus professor in the SLAC Theory Group at the SLAC National Accelerator Laboratory at Stanford University.

== Biography ==
Brodsky obtained an undergraduate degree in 1961 and Ph.D. in physics in 1964 from the University of Minnesota, where his advisor was Donald R. Yennie. After two years as a research associate for Tsung-Dao Lee at Columbia University, in 1966 he began working for SLAC, where he became a professor in 1976.

Brodsky's research has focused on quantum chromodynamics, which is the theory describing the strong interactions between quarks and gluons. His 1973 paper co-authored with Glennys Farrar, Scaling Laws at Large Transverse Momentum (Phys. Rev. Lett. 31, 1153–1156), and 1980 paper with Peter Lepage, Exclusive Processes in Perturbative Quantum Chromodynamics (Phys. Rev. D 22, 2157–2198), led to the award of the Sakurai Prize.

He was the 2007 recipient of the Sakurai Prize for Theoretical Particle Physics, "for applications of perturbative quantum field theory to critical questions of elementary particle physics, in particular, to the analysis of hard exclusive strong interaction processes." He received the Pomeranchuk Prize, an international award for theoretical physics in 2015.

== See also ==
- Light front holography
- Light-front computational methods

== External ==
- Stanley Brodsky personal page at SLAC
- Sánchez Sorondo, Marcelo; Zichichi, Antonino, eds. (2014). "Novel Perspectives for Hadron Physics by Stanley J. Brodsky" (PDF). Subnuclear Physics: Past, Present and Future; Proceedings of the International Symposium, held 30 October - 2 November 2011, held in Vatican City. Scripta Varia, volume 119. Pontifical Academy of Sciences. pp. 229–245.
- Oral history interview transcript for Stanley Brodsky on 22 April 2021, American Institute of Physics, Niels Bohr Library & Archives
