= AdS/QCD correspondence =

Correspondence between anti-de Sitter space and quantum chromodynamics

In theoretical physics, the anti-de Sitter/quantum chromodynamics correspondence is a goal (not yet successfully accomplished) to describe quantum chromodynamics (QCD) in terms of a dual gravitational theory, following the principles of the AdS/CFT correspondence in a setup where the quantum field theory is not a conformal field theory.

== History ==
The proposal of the AdS/CFT correspondence in late 1997 was the culmination of a long history of efforts to relate string theory to nuclear physics. In fact, string theory was originally developed during the late 1960s and early 1970s as a theory of hadrons, the subatomic particles like the proton and neutron that are held together by the strong nuclear force. The idea was that each of these particles could be viewed as a different oscillation mode of a string. In the late 1960s, experimentalists had found that hadrons fall into families called Regge trajectories with squared energy proportional to angular momentum, and theorists showed that this relationship emerges naturally from the physics of a rotating relativistic string.

On the other hand, attempts to model hadrons as strings faced serious problems. One problem was that string theory includes a massless spin-2 particle whereas no such particle appears in the physics of hadrons. Such a particle would mediate a force with the properties of gravity. In 1974, Joël Scherk and John Schwarz suggested that string theory was therefore not a theory of nuclear physics as many theorists had thought but instead a theory of quantum gravity. At the same time, it was realized that hadrons are actually made of quarks, and the string theory approach was abandoned in favor of quantum chromodynamics.

In quantum chromodynamics, quarks have a kind of charge that comes in three varieties called colors. In a paper from 1974, Gerard 't Hooft studied the relationship between string theory and nuclear physics from another point of view by considering theories similar to quantum chromodynamics, where the number of colors is some arbitrary number $N$, rather than three. In this article, 't Hooft considered a certain limit where $N$ tends to infinity and argued that in this limit certain calculations in quantum field theory resemble calculations in string theory.

In late 1997, Juan Maldacena published a landmark paper that initiated the study of AdS/CFT. One special case of Maldacena's proposal says that N = 4 supersymmetric Yang–Mills theory, a gauge theory similar in some ways to quantum chromodynamics, is equivalent to string theory in five-dimensional anti-de Sitter space. This result helped clarify the earlier work of 't Hooft on the relationship between string theory and quantum chromodynamics, taking string theory back to its roots as a theory of nuclear physics.

== Applications of AdS/CFT ==
One physical system that has been studied using the AdS/CFT correspondence is the quark–gluon plasma, an exotic state of matter produced in particle accelerators. This state of matter arises for brief instants when heavy ions such as gold or lead nuclei are collided at high energies. Such collisions cause the quarks that make up atomic nuclei to deconfine at temperatures of approximately two trillion kelvins, conditions similar to those present at around $10^{-11}$ seconds after the Big Bang.

The physics of the quark–gluon plasma is governed by quantum chromodynamics, but this theory is mathematically intractable in problems involving the quark–gluon plasma. In an article appearing in 2005, Đàm Thanh Sơn and his collaborators showed that the AdS/CFT correspondence could be used to understand some aspects of the quark–gluon plasma by describing it in the language of string theory. By applying the AdS/CFT correspondence, Sơn and his collaborators were able to describe the quark gluon plasma in terms of black holes in five-dimensional spacetime. The calculation showed that the ratio of two quantities associated with the quark–gluon plasma, the shear viscosity $\eta$ and volume density of entropy $s$, should be approximately equal to a certain universal constant:

$$\frac{\eta}{s}\approx\frac{\hbar}{4\pi k}$$

where $\hbar$ denotes the reduced Planck constant and $k$ is the Boltzmann constant. In addition, the authors conjectured that this universal constant provides a lower bound for $\eta/s$ in a large class of systems. In an experiment conducted at the Relativistic Heavy Ion Collider at Brookhaven National Laboratory, the experimental result in one model was close to this universal contant but it was not the case in another model.

Another important property of the quark–gluon plasma is that very high energy quarks moving through the plasma are stopped or "quenched" after traveling only a few femtometers. This phenomenon is characterized by a number $\widehat{q}$ called the jet quenching parameter, which relates the energy loss of such a quark to the squared distance traveled through the plasma. Calculations based on the AdS/CFT correspondence give the estimated value $\widehat{q}$ ~ 4 GeV^{2}/fm, and the experimental value of $\widehat{q}$ lies in the range 5–15 GeV^{2}/fm.

== Criticism ==
Despite many physicists turning towards string-based methods to attack problems in nuclear and condensed matter physics, some theorists working in these areas have expressed doubts about whether the AdS/CFT correspondence can provide the tools needed to realistically model real-world systems. In a talk at the Quark Matter conference in 2006, Larry McLerran pointed out that the $N=4$ super Yang–Mills theory that appears in the AdS/CFT correspondence differs significantly from quantum chromodynamics, making it difficult to apply these methods to nuclear physics. According to McLerran,

"$N=4$ supersymmetric Yang–Mills is not QCD ... It has no mass scale and is conformally invariant. It has no confinement and no running coupling constant. It is supersymmetric. It has no chiral symmetry breaking or mass generation. It has six scalar and fermions in the adjoint representation ... It may be possible to correct some or all of the above problems, or, for various physical problems, some of the objections may not be relevant. As yet there is no consensus nor compelling arguments for the conjectured fixes or phenomena which would insure that the $N=4$ supersymmetric Yang Mills results would reliably reflect QCD."

== See also ==
- Light front holography
- AdS/CMT correspondence
