= Light front holography =

Technique used to determine mass of hadrons

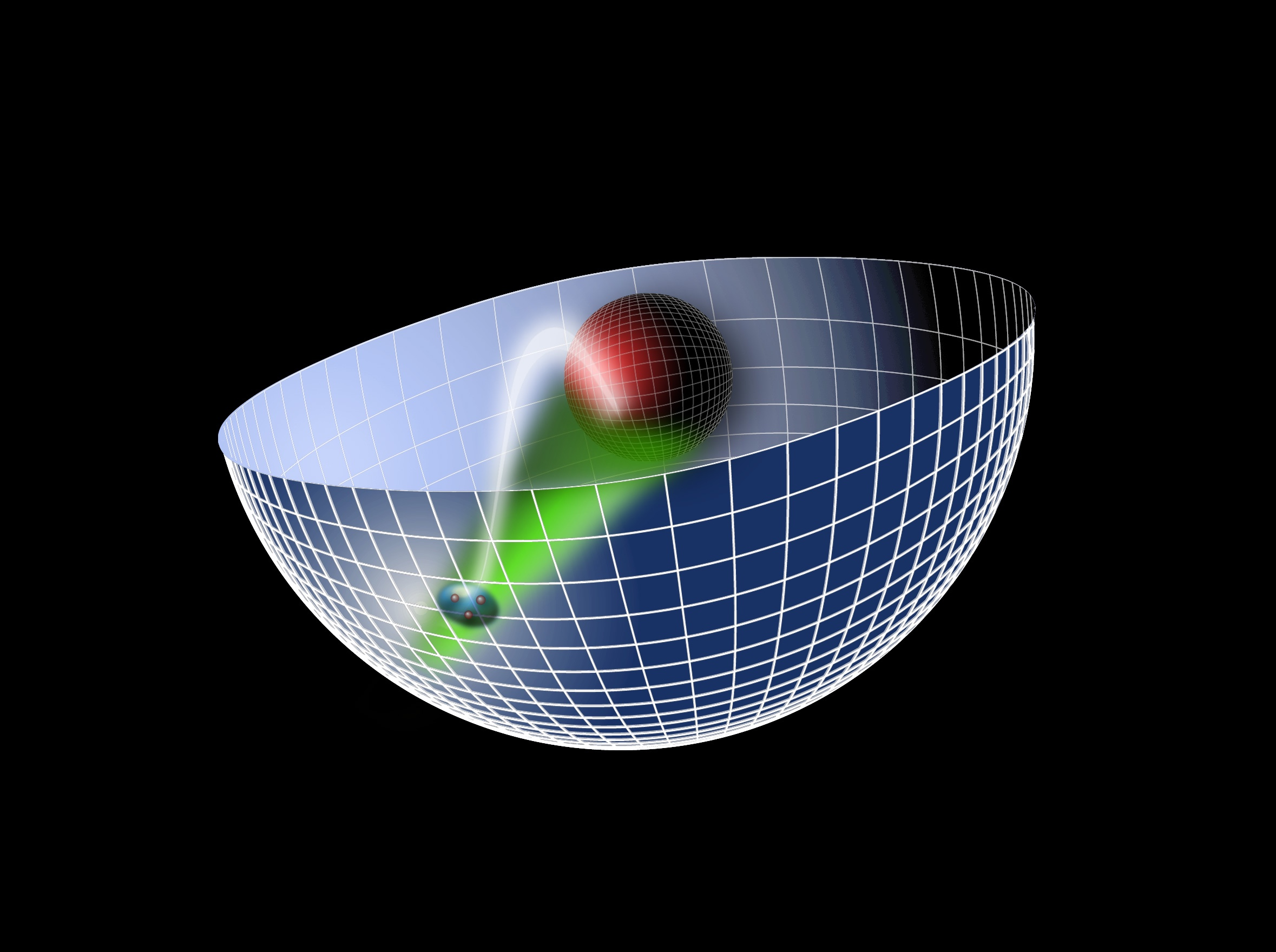
A proton in AdS space. Different values of the radius (labeled $z$) correspond to different scales at which the proton is examined. Events at short distances happen in the four-dimensional AdS boundary (large circumference). The inner sphere represents large distance events. In the figure, a small proton created at the AdS boundary falls into AdS space pulled by the gravitational field up to its larger size allowed by confinement. Due to the warped geometry the proton size shrinks near the AdS boundary as perceived by an observer in Minkowski space.

In strong interaction physics, light front holography or light front holographic QCD is an approximate version of the theory of quantum chromodynamics (QCD) which results from mapping the gauge theory of QCD to a higher-dimensional anti-de Sitter space (AdS) inspired by the AdS/CFT correspondence (gauge/gravity duality) proposed for string theory. This procedure makes it possible to find analytic solutions (closed-form expression) in situations where strong coupling occurs (the "strongly coupled regime"), improving predictions of the masses of hadrons (such as protons, neutrons, and mesons) and their internal structure revealed by high-energy accelerator experiments. The most widely used approach to finding approximate solutions to the QCD equations, lattice QCD, has had many successful applications; It is a numerical approach formulated in Euclidean space rather than physical Minkowski space-time.

== Motivation and background ==
One of the key problems in elementary particle physics is to compute the mass spectrum and structure of hadrons, such as the proton, as bound states of quarks and gluons. Unlike quantum electrodynamics (QED), the strong coupling constant of the constituents of a proton calculates hadronic properties, such as the proton mass and color confinement, a most difficult problem to solve. The most successful theoretical approach has been to formulate QCD as a lattice gauge theory and employ large numerical simulations on advanced computers. Notwithstanding, important dynamical QCD properties in Minkowski space-time are not amenable to Euclidean numerical lattice computations. An important theoretical goal is thus to find an initial approximation to QCD which is both analytically tractable and which can be systematically improved.

To address this problem, the light front holography approach maps a confining gauge theory quantized on the light front to a higher-dimensional anti-de Sitter space (AdS) incorporating the AdS/CFT correspondence as a useful guide. The AdS/CFT correspondence is an example of the holographic principle, since it relates gravitation in a five-dimensional AdS space to a conformal quantum field theory at its four-dimensional space-time boundary.

Light front quantization was introduced by Paul Dirac to solve relativistic quantum field theories. It is the ideal framework to describe the structure of the hadrons in terms of their constituents measured at the same light-front time, $\tau = x^0 + x^3$, the time marked by the front of a light wave. In the light front the Hamiltonian equations for relativistic bound state systems and the AdS wave equations have a similar structure, which makes the connection of QCD with gauge/gravity methods possible. The interrelation of the AdS geometrical representation with light-front holography provides a remarkable first approximation for the mass spectra and wave functions of meson and baryon light-quark bound states.

Light front holographic methods were originally found by Stanley J. Brodsky and Guy de Téramond Peralta in 2006 by mapping the electric charge and inertia distributions from the quark currents and the stress–energy tensor of the fundamental constituents within a hadron in AdS to physical space time using light-front theory. A gravity dual of QCD is not known, but the mechanisms of confinement can be incorporated in the gauge/gravity correspondence by modifying the AdS geometry at large values of the AdS fifth-dimension coordinate $z$, which sets the scale of the strong interactions. In the usual AdS/QCD framework fields in AdS are introduced to match the chiral symmetry of QCD, and its spontaneous symmetry breaking, but without explicit connection with the internal constituent structure of hadrons.

== Light front wave equation ==
From this equation, we can map the dynamics of quarks and gluons within hadrons to a higher-dimensional anti-de Sitter (AdS) space. In a semiclassical approximation to QCD the light-front Hamiltonian equation $P_\mu P^\mu \vert \phi \rangle = \mathcal{M}^2 \vert \phi \rangle$ is a relativistic and frame-independent Schrödinger equation

$\left(-\frac{d^2}{d\zeta^2} - \frac{1 - 4L^2}{4\zeta^2} + U(\zeta) \right) \phi(\zeta) = M^2 \phi(\zeta),$

where $L$ is the orbital angular momentum of the constituents and the variable $\zeta$ is the invariant separation distance between the quarks in the hadron at equal light-front time. The variable $\zeta$ is identified with the holographic variable $z$ in AdS space and the confining potential energy $U(\zeta)$ is derived from the warp factor which modifies the AdS geometry and breaks its conformal invariance. Its eigenvalues give the hadronic spectrum, and its eigenvectors represent the probability distributions of the hadronic constituents at a given scale.

== See also ==
- AdS/CFT
- AdS/QCD
- General Relativity
- Quantum chromodynamics
- Quantum electrodynamics
- Quantum field theories
- String theory
