= Effective theory =

Type of approximation to an underlying physical theory

In science, an effective theory is a deliberately limited scientific theory applicable under specific circumstances. In practice, all theories are effective theories, with the name "effective theory" being used to signal that the limitations are built in by design.

== Examples ==
An early example is Galileo Galilei's theory of falling bodies. Using observed values, Galileo deduced that the height of a falling body can be accounted for by constant acceleration, written here in modern notation:
$$\frac{d^2z}{dt^2} = -g,$$
where t is the time, z is the vertical position of an object and g is gravitational acceleration near the surface of Earth.

Within the scope of objects falling on Earth, this theory works well. However, as Isaac Newton discovered in his Newton's law of universal gravitation, a more elaborate but still effective theory, has more scope at the expense of additional complications. The next layer was Albert Einstein's general relativity, with more scope but even more complications.

== Effective field theory ==
Effective field theory is a method used to describe physical theories when there is a hierarchy of scales. Effective field theories in physics can include quantum field theories in which the fields are treated as fundamental, and effective theories describing phenomena in solid-state physics. For instance, the BCS theory of superconduction treats vibrations of the solid-state lattice as a "field" (i.e. without claiming that there is really a field), with its own field quanta, known as phonons. Such "effective particles" derived from effective fields are also known as quasiparticles. The standard Big Bang cosmological theory, Lambda-CDM is an effective theory for some as yet undiscovered underlying physical theory.

In a certain sense, quantum field theory, and any other currently known physical theory, could be described as "effective", as in being the "low energy limit" of an as-yet unknown theory of everything.

== See also ==
- Effective mass (solid-state physics)
- Emergence
- Empirism
- Epistemology
- Heuristics
- Hypotheses non fingo
- Phenomenological model
- Phenomenology (physics)
- Scientific method
- Turing test
