= Color transparency =

Phenomenon in high-energy physics

Color transparency is a phenomenon observed in high-energy particle physics, where hadrons (particles made of quarks such as a proton or mesons) created in a nucleus propagate through that nucleus with less interaction than expected. It suggests that hadrons are first created with a small size in the nucleus, and then grow to their nominal size. Here, color refers to the color charge, the property of quarks and gluons that determines how strongly they interact through the nuclear strong force.

Color transparency is also known as "color screening", "color coherence" or "color neutrality".

== Description ==
Color transparency arises from the behavior of quarks inside hadrons. These quarks are held together by the strong interaction, mediated by gluons. At high energies, when a high-energy hadron -or more generally a color singlet object interacts with a nucleus, it can propagate in the nucleus with less scattering than expected. This reduced scattering, or transparency, is attributed to the fact soon after the hadron is created, the gluon cloud surrounding the quarks is more compact, viz the effective size of the singlet object is small, leading to reduced interaction. This effect is observed in experiments involving high-energy electron scattering off nuclei, where the transparency increases with increasing energy of the incoming particles, or more precisely with the 4-momentum transfer $Q$ between the accelerated particle beam and target nucleus.

== Interpretation ==
Color transparency is interpreted as the creation of point-like configurations (PLC), also called small-size configurations (SSC) or ejectile, that are color singlet and of radius $r \sim \hbar/Q$, where $\hbar$ is the reduced Planck constant. The radius is small because the quarks are close to each other, making their external color fields to cancel, much like the electric field of an electric dipole vanishes at distances much larger than the dipole size. If the energy-momentum of the PLC/SSC/ejectile is high enough, it does not have time to expand to its nominal size (e.g., about 0.8 fm if the PLC/SSC becomes a proton) while propagating in the target nucleus, resulting in it going through the nucleus unimpeded.

The above interpretation is in the partonic language, which uses quarks and gluons as the degrees of freedom. Due to the quark-hadron duality, or parton-hadron duality, meaning that all QCD predictions can be expressed using a hadronic basis, color transparency can also be described using hadronic degrees of freedom. In that case, the ejectile, although not a hadron (i.e., not an eigenstate of the QCD Hamiltonian despite being color singlet), can be represented as a superposition of hadrons. Such a superposition state has a smaller size than each individual hadron. As the ejectile propagates in the nucleus, all but one of the hadron states constituting the ejectile state are filtered out by the interaction of the ejectile with the nucleons in the nucleus. The remaining hadronic state corresponds to the hadron eventually produced in the reaction. The filtering out of the other states occurs after a typical formation time $\tau_f$. If the distance $c \tau_f$ is larger than the nucleus size, then no filtering happens in the nucleus, the ejectile keeps its small size, and propagates largely unhindered. This is color transparency described with hadronic degrees of freedom.

== Experimental observations ==
The phenomenon has been observed in several experiments, including experiment E791 at Fermilab. The experiment ran from June 1988 to January 1992 and collided high-energy (500 GeV) pions onto carbon and platinum nuclei. The experiment observed evidence of color transparency in the production of vector mesons, such as $\rho$ and $\phi$ mesons. Other experiments that observed evidence for color transparency include the E665 experiment, also at Fermilab, the HERMES experiment at DESY, the E01-107 and the E02-110 experiments at Jefferson Lab.

The experimental signal for color transparency is the "nuclear transparency", defined as the ratio between the nuclear cross section per nucleon over that on a free nucleon. Color transparency then predicts an increase of nuclear transparency with $Q$.

== Importance ==
Color transparency is important because it provides valuable insights into the strong interaction. In fact, color transparency is a prediction of the quantum field theory of the strong force, quantum chromodynamics (QCD). Additionally, color transparency has implications for nuclear physics and the structure of atomic nuclei. By studying how particles interact with nuclei at high energies, one learns more about the distributions of quarks and gluons within nucleons and how they are affected by the surrounding nuclear environment. The noticeable modification of these distributions by the nuclear environment is known as the EMC effect and is, as of 2024, a vibrant field of research in particle and nuclear physics.
