= Marcel Froissart =

French physicist and professor (1934–2015)

Marcel Froissart (20 December 1934, 6th arrondissement of Paris – 21 October 2015, 14th arrondissement of Paris) was a French theoretical physicist, specializing in particle physics. He is known for the Froissart bound and the Froissart–Stora equation.

== Biography ==
After secondary study at the Lycée Louis-le-Grand, Marcel Froissart matriculated in 1953 at the École polytechnique, where he graduated in 1955. He then entered in October 1956 Mines ParisTech, now known as École nationale supérieure des mines de Paris (Mines Paris - PSL). After completing only one semester of a four-semester technical curriculum, he was sent in civil cooperation with the French Navy to Algeria (during the Algerian War, which lasted from 1954 to 1962). He was reassigned in 1957 to the Commissariat à l'énergie atomique (CEA), for which he worked in Geneva from 1957 to 1958 at CERN. Again in civil cooperation with the French military, he was reassigned to work at the University of Algeria from 1958 to 1959. He completed his study at Mines ParisTech in 1959. He held a temporary appointment from 1960 to 1961 at the University of California, Berkeley, where he worked on S-matrix theory under the leadership of Geoffrey Chew and collaborated with, among others, Marvin "Murph" Goldberger and Kenneth M. Watson. At Princeton University, he held temporary positions for the academic years 1961–1962 and 1965–1966. In the 1960s, he collaborated with the mathematician Bernard Morin.

In 1964 Froissart received the Prix Paul Langevin awarded by the Société Française de Physique (SFP) . He contributed to the 13th International Conference on High-Energy Physics held in Berkeley from the 1st of August to the 7th of September 1966. In January 1967 his paper with John R. Taylor was published. In October 1967 in Brussels, Froissart was an invited participant at the 14th Solvay Conference. In 1973 he was appointed a professor at the Collège de France in the particle physics chair, which he held until he retired as professor emeritus in 2004.

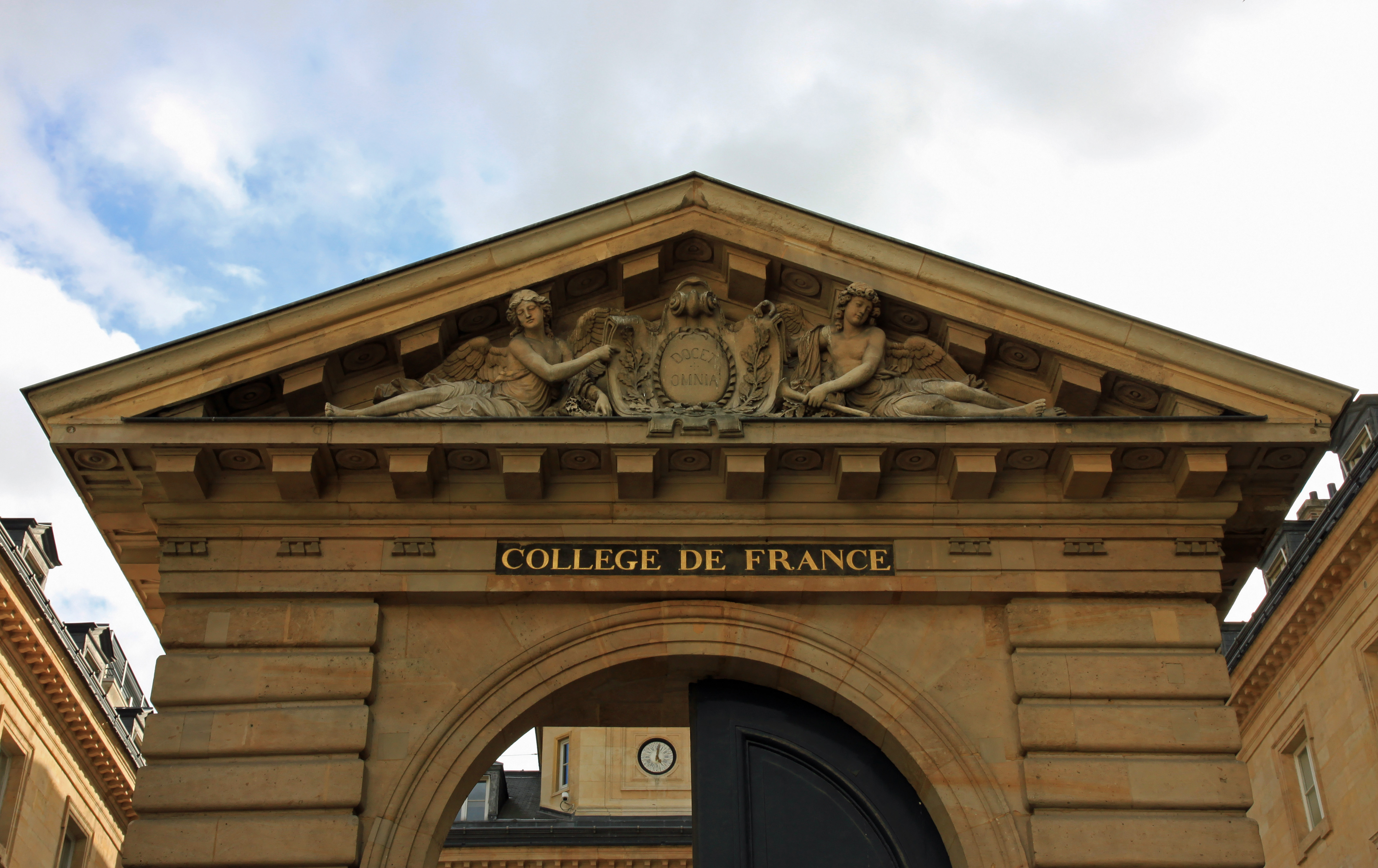
Pediment of the Collège de France, bearing the crest with the Latin motto Docet omnia

Froissart consolidated into a single laboratory, dependent on his professorial chair, two laboratories — one headed by Francis Perrin and the other by Louis Leprince-Ringuet. At the time of the consolidation, those laboratories were the two largest of the Collège de France. The immediate task was to unify those two laboratories, whose members generally considered the two as competing organizations. A longer-term task was to reduce the size of the laboratory, while maintaining significant activity on the international scene. At the consolidated laboratory, the policy followed by the Collège de France was to only host small, easily mobile units — in case that the professor directing the consolidated laboratory was replaced by a new director pursuing different research goals in physics. Thus, in the consolidated laboratory, the physicists who wanted to work on the LHC, which was not to enter service until after the departure of Professor Froissart, were jointly requested by the Institut national de physique nucléaire et de physique des particules (IN2P3) and the Collège de France to leave the consolidated laboratory and to join LHC-oriented laboratories. Of those researchers who remained in the consolidated laboratory, a majority turned to research on astroparticles (to be in line with Froissart's expertise and leadership in high energy physics). The laboratory then took the name Physique corpusculaire et cosmologie (PCC). When Marcel Froissart retired, the laboratory formed the core of the new Astroparticle and Cosmology Laboratory (APC, AstroParticule et Cosmologie), created in 2006 by Pierre Binétruy. The new laboratory had researchers from Paris Diderot University (Paris 7), the Observatoire de Paris and the Commissariat à l'énergie atomique (CEA).

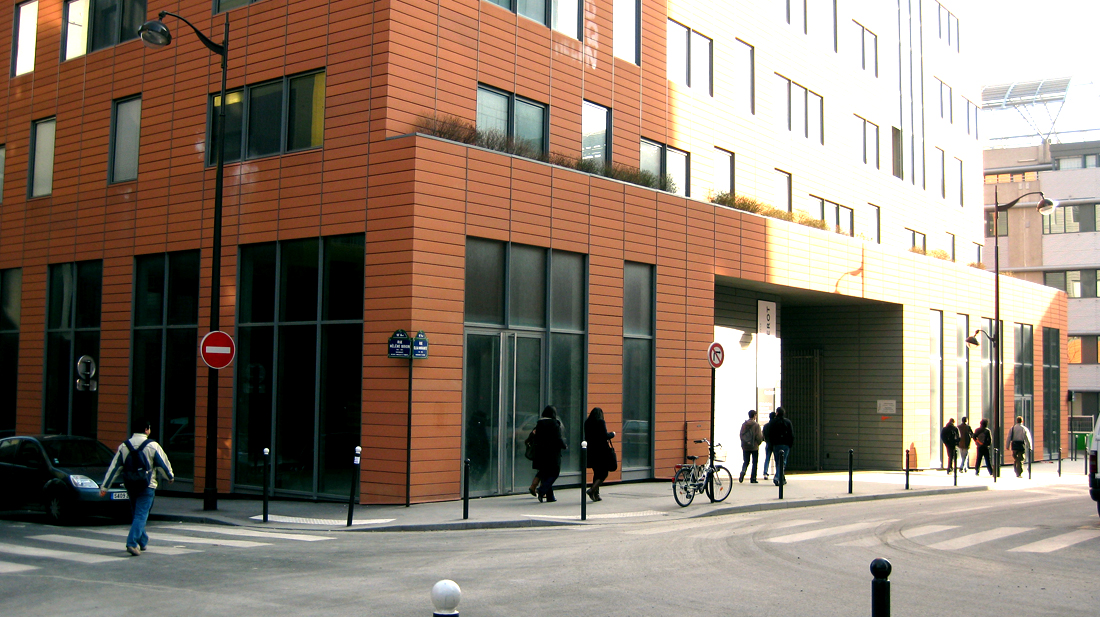
Bâtiment Condorcet, headquarters of the physics department of Paris Diderot University (Paris 7), in the 13th arrondissement of Paris

Froissart, as laboratory director, found himself at the center of a controversy over the rubbiatron. He was one of the main developers of the Groupement des scientifiques pour l'information sur l'énergie nucléaire (GSIEN, Association of Scientists for Information on Nuclear Energy).

The famous photographer Martine Franck made a portrait of Froissart. Marcel Froissart was a grandson of the glassmaker Antonin Daum and a nephew of Michel Froissart, who was in the 1930s one of the designers of the wooden construction technique called froissartage.

Upon his death in 2015, Marcel Froissart was survived by his widow, 3 sons, 2 daughters, and 10 grandchildren.

== Selected research achievements ==
- Study of the polarization stability of polarized relativistic protons in a synchrotron, showing the existence of resonance energies leading to polarization reversal (Froissart & Stora 1960)
- Work on the theory of particle collisions, within the framework of the Mandelstam representation
- Research of a possible axiomatic justification of the Mandelstam representation (Fotiadi et al. 1965)
- Generalization of Bell's inequalities to various systems (Froissart 1981)
- Research on the application of the theory of analytic functions to the localization of a point on a plane surface (Patent 1988)
- Studies of various properties of light mesons (Benayoun & Froissart 1989)

== Selected publications ==
- Froissart, Marcel; Stora, Raymond (June 1960). "Dépolarisation d'un faisceau de protons polarisés dans un synchrotron". Nuclear Instruments and Methods. 7 (3). North-Holland: 297–305. Bibcode:1960NucIM...7..297F. doi:10.1016/0029-554X(60)90033-1.
- Froissart, Marcel (August 1961). "Asymptotic Behavior and Subtractions in the Mandelstam Representation". Physical Review. 123 (3). American Physical Society: 1053–1057. Bibcode:1961PhRv..123.1053F. doi:10.1103/PhysRev.123.1053.
- Omnès, Roland; Froissart, Marcel (1963). Mandelstam Theory and Regge Poles: An Introduction for Experimentalists. New York and Amsterdam: W.A. Benjamin. LCCN 63022795.
- Fotiadi, Dimitri; Froissart, Marcel; Lascoux, Jean; Pham, Frédéric (1965). "Applications of an isotopy theorem". Topology. 4 (2). Pergamon Press: 159–191. doi:10.1016/0040-9383(65)90063-7.
- Froissart, Marcel (August 1981). "Constructive Generalization of Bell's Inequalities". Il Nuovo Cimento B. 64 (2). Italian Physical Society: 241–251. Bibcode:1981NCimB..64..241F. doi:10.1007/BF02903286. ISSN 0369-3554. S2CID 123510976.
- Benayoun, Maurice; Froissart, Marcel (March 1989). "Some topics on light-flavour meson physics". Nuclear Physics B. 315 (2). North-Holland: 295–360. Bibcode:1989NuPhB.315..295B. doi:10.1016/0550-3213(89)90358-1.

== Texts on line ==
- 1970 : Modèles théoriques, basse énergie, Le Journal de physique, vol. 31, no. C5 (novembre-décembre), pp. C5-88
- 1974 - 2004 : Cours publics et rapports de Marcel Froissart, Collège de France (Chaire de physique corpusculaire)

== Patent ==
- 1988 : A device for two-dimensional localization of current-generating events on a resistive surface, U.S. patent US4788384A (in collaboration with Roger Bruère-Dawson, Bernard M. Maréchal et Marcio N. DeSouza)
