= Stavros Katsanevas =

French physicist (1953–2022)

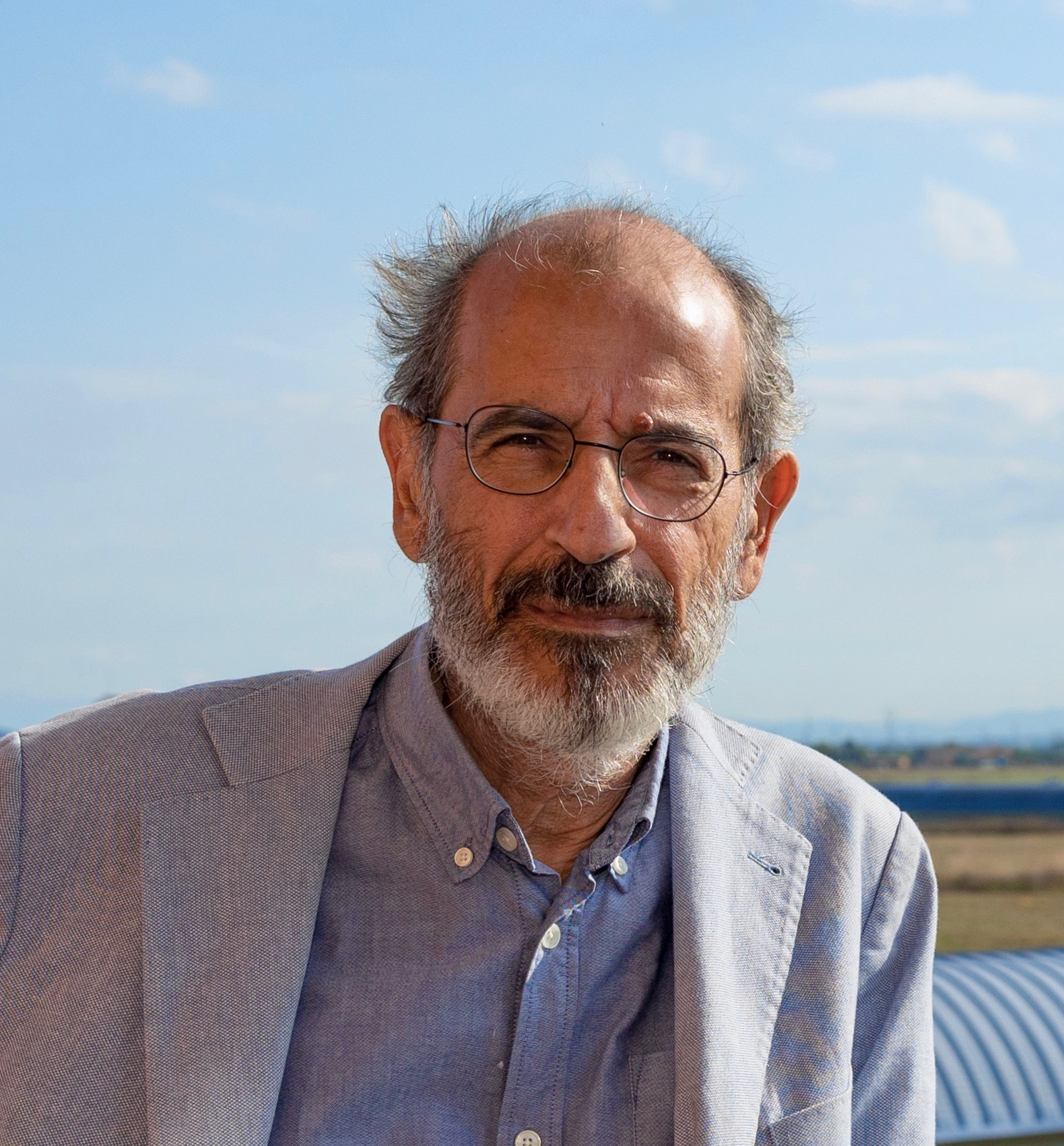
- Born: 1953; Athens, Greece
- Died: 27 November 2022 (aged 69); Pisa, Italy
- Education: University of Athens; University of Paris XI
- Known for: Supersymmetry; Astroparticle physics; Gravitational waves
- Awards: Ordre national du Mérite (2011)
- Scientific career
- Fields: Physics
- Workplaces: Université Paris Cité; IN2P3; CNRS

Stavros Katsanevas (1953 – 27 November 2022) was a Greek-French astrophysicist who was director of the European Gravitational Observatory, professor (Exceptional Class) at the Université Paris Cité, former director of the AstroParticle and Cosmology (APC) laboratory and former chairman of the Astroparticle Physics European Consortium (APPEC). In 2000, he received for his work on supersymmetry the Physics Prize from the Academy of Athens. In 2011, he was awarded the Ordre National du Merite. He was an ordinary member of Academy of Europe, Earth and Cosmic Sciences since 2019.

== Education and work ==
Katsanevas was born in Athens, Greece, where he did his undergraduate studies in physics at the University of Athens. He obtained a doctorate "of 3rd cycle" from University of Paris XI and a PhD from the University of Athens, where he was later a lecturer and an associate professor (1982–1996). He has spent three years as a postdoc at the Fermi National Laboratory. He also worked at CERN, as a CERN Fellow, CERN Associate Scientist and as CERN Corresponding fellow. He then moved (1996–2002) as a professor to France to the Université de Lyon I Claude Bernard. In 2002, he became Deputy Scientific Director of IN2P3/CNRS for the field of Neutrino and Astroparticle Physics (until 2012), transferring at the same time to the Université Paris VII Denis Diderot, where he was Professor Exceptional Class. Since 2018, he was director of the European Gravitational Observatory near Pisa.

From 2000, Katsanevas held the following positions:

- Director of the European Gravitational Observatory (2018–2023)
- Director of the Astroparticle and Cosmology Laboratory of CNRS / IN2P3 (2014–2017)
- Chairman of the Astroparticle Physics European Consortium (APPEC)
- Deputy Director of IN2P3/CNRS responsible for Neutrino, Cosmology and Astroparticle Physics (2002–2012)
- Director of the CNRS interdisciplinary program "Astroparticle Physics" (2002–2010)
- Chairman of the EU funded agency consortium AStroparticle Physics European Research Area NETwork (ASPERA)
- Principal Investigator (in a total of 15) of the Institute for the Physics and Mathematics of the Universe at Tokyo (2007–2018)
- President of the council of the European Gravitational Observatory (EGO) host of the VIRGO gravitational wave antenna (2003–2008 and 2011–2017)

Katsanevas was also a member of the following committees:

- Steering Committee of Astroparticle Physics European Coordination (ApPEC)(2002–20??)
- AstroParticle Physics International Forum (APIF) of OECD (2010–2014)
- European Strategy Group as representative of APPEC (2011–2013)
- CERN Super Proton Synchrotron (SPS) Committee (SPSC) (2008–2010)
- PaNAGIC (Particle and Nuclear Astrophysics and Gravitation International Committee) astroparticle coordination - IUPAP working group (2005–2012)
- Evaluation Committee for Space Research and Exploration and Inter-Organism Committee of CNES (National Centre of Space Studies, France) (2002–2012)
- Scientific council (chairman) of IFAE/Barcelona (2009–2013)

== Research interests ==
- Theory of strong interactions (Quantum Chromodynamics, QCD) (1977–1986)

- Search and discovery of new particle resonances including charm quarks, photoproduction experiment WA4 at CERN (1977–1979)
- Tests of QCD through the study of Drell-Yan pairs and J/y resonances in nuclear targets with antiproton and pion beams, experiment E537 at Fermilab (1979–1982)
- Search for quark-gluon plasma transition, experiment R807-808 at CERN (1983–1986)

- Standard model of weak and electromagnetic interactions (1986–2000)

- Study of the standard model of electro-weak interactions and supersymmetry: experiment DELPHI of the Large Electron Positron (LEP) collider.
- Phenomenological studies of supersymmetry: Monte Carlo generator SUSYGEN and computing of higher order cross sections

- Neutrino and Astroparticle Physics (1983–2002)

- Neutrino oscillations, experiment PS180 at CERN (1983–1986)
- High Energy neutrino telescopes, NESTOR in Pylos/Greece (1992–1996)
- Neutrino oscillations, long baseline experiment CERN-Gran Sasso OPERA (1998–2002)

- Interdisciplinary studies

- DACQ for Positron Emitting Tomography (PET) Scanners (co-holder of a patent)
- Innovative high sensibility photodetectors with high space and time resolution

== Personal life and death ==
Katsanevas died in Pisa, Italy on 27 November 2022, at the age of 69.

== See also ==
- Astroparticle physics – Branch of particle physics
- IN2P3 – Coordinating body for nuclear and particle physics in France
- European Gravitational Observatory – Consortium managing the Virgo interferometric antenna in Pisa, Italy
- Aspera European Astroparticle network – Pan-European network of government agencies coordinating astroparticle physics research
- Supersymmetry – Symmetry between bosons and fermions
