= Lucia Votano =

Italian particle physicist and Director of the Gran Sasso National Laboratory

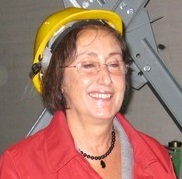
- Born: 2 November 1947 (age 78); Villa San Giovanni, Italy
- Education: Sapienza University of Rome
- Known for: OPERA experiment; First female director of Laboratori Nazionali del Gran Sasso
- Awards: Commander of the Order of Merit of the Italian Republic (2010)
- Scientific career
- Fields: Astroparticle physics

Lucia Votano (born 2 November 1947) is an Italian astroparticle physicist, and the first woman to direct the Gran Sasso National Laboratory, from 2009 to 2012. Her research focuses on neutrinos, and she was the coordinator of the OPERA experiment, that led to the first detection of tau neutrinos from muon neutrino oscillation.

== Early life and education ==
Votano studied humanities at the Liceo Classico Tommaso Campanella in Reggio Calabria; later she obtained her degree in General Physics from the Sapienza University of Rome in 1971, graduating cum laude. Her interest in science was fuelled in her young years by her father, a radiologist, who was passionate about scientific research and first narrated the discovery of DNA to her.

== Life and career ==
=== Academic career ===
She started her career as a researcher of the National Institute for Nuclear Physics at the Frascati National Laboratory in 1976. She collaborated with research projects at CERN, in particular the ISR and the WA44 experiment. Between 1985 and 1998 she participated at the ZEUS experiment at the DESY research center in Hamburg.

In 1988, Votano became Senior Researcher and in 2000 she was promoted to Research Director. She covered the role of coordinator of the OPERA experiment, whose data collection started in 2006 and resulted in the detection of 5 tau neutrinos from muon neutrino oscillations. In 2009, the board of directors of the INFN appointed her as Director of the Gran Sasso National Laboratory; she was the first woman to cover this role, which she held until 2012, when she was succeeded by Stefano Ragazzi.

Her reaction to the media coverage following the appointment to the prestigious role was two-fold: on one side she deemed it positive, as it highlighted the fact that "finally a woman had conquered a position at the top of the scientific leadership"; on the other hand it was negative, "because if that was the norm, [the news of the appointment] would not have caused any clamour". In 2011 at an international symposium held in Vatican City, he gave a talk Achievements in Subnuclear Physics at Fermilab. In 2011 she gave a talk Origin and Status of the Gran Sasso Laboratory at the international symposium on subnuclear physics held in Vatican City.

As of 2020, she is part of the 600 scientists currently working on JUNO, a neutrino experiment under construction in Southern China.

=== Publications ===
Votano authored or co-authored about 300 scientific publications in peer-reviewed journals. She is also the author of two books:

- Il fantasma dell'universo, Carocci Editore, 2015, ISBN 9788843075188
- La via della seta. La fisica da Enrico Fermi alla Cina. Di Renzo Editore, 2017, ISBN 9788883233173

=== Honours and awards ===
- In 2009, she received the Minerva prize for scientific research.
- In March 2010, she was awarded the Order of Merit of the Italian Republic by the Italian president, Giorgio Napolitano.
- In 2019, she became honorary member of the Italian Physical Society.
