= Isaac Asimov Awards =

Several awards named after Isaac Asimov

At least four distinct awards have been named for science fiction writer, humanist, and chemist Isaac Asimov. These include:

- The Isaac Asimov Award for Undergraduate Excellence in Science Fiction and Fantasy Short Story Writing, later known as the Dell Magazines Award, is an annual award open to undergraduate college students and given to the author of the best science fiction or fantasy short story., Established by the magazine Asimov's Science Fiction and the International Association for the Fantastic in the Arts, the award is typically given for character-driven stories of the type published in that magazine.
- The Asimov Prize (Italian: Premio Asimov) is a literary-scientific award organised by the Istituto Nazionale di Fisica Nucleare (INFN) and Gran Sasso Science Institute graduate school in Italy, for popular science books, edited in the Italian language. Its organising committee is composed of several hundred teachers and researchers from all over Italy. Originally established at Gran Sasso Science Institute on the initiative of Francesco Vissani of Laboratori Nazionali del Gran Sasso, it grew and became a national prize thanks to INFN and many other scientific institutions. The winner is selected by a large jury of thousands of high school students. The inaugural recipient (2016) was the chemist Peter Atkins. In 2017 the winner was the medical doctor Roberto Burioni, and in 2018 there were joint winners, Helen Czerski and Marco Malvaldi. In 2019 the neurophysiologist Lamberto Maffei won the prize. and British mathematician Hannah Fry won it in 2020.
- The skeptical organization CSICOP established an Isaac Asimov Award in 1994 "to honor Asimov for his extraordinary contributions to science and humanity". The first recipient was Asimov's friend Carl Sagan. Stephen Jay Gould was also a winner.
- In 1998, the American Humanist Association awarded its first Isaac Asimov Award to Eugenie Scott. Awardees since then have included Robert Sapolsky, Neil deGrasse Tyson, Steve Wozniak, Richard Leakey, Lynn J. Rothschild, and Stephon Alexander.
