= Frank J. Sciulli =

American experimental physicist (born 1938)

Frank J. Sciulli (born 22 August 1938 in Philadelphia) is an American experimental physicist, specializing in particle physics.

Sciulli studied at the University of Pennsylvania with bachelor's degree in 1960, master's degree in 1961, and PhD in 1965 with a dissertation involving experiments on K-meson decays. At Caltech he was a postdoc. There he became in 1969 an assistant professor and later a professor. In 1981 he became a professor at Columbia University. There he chaired the physics department from 1988 to 1991.

At the beginning of his career Sciulli did research on how hadrons reveal the selection rules that govern the weak interaction. In the late 1960s, he turned to deep-inelastic scattering of neutrinos by nucleons. This research, which came to be called the CCFR (Chicago-Columbia-Fermilab-Rochester) collaboration at Fermilab, had an impact on the quark model, weak neutral currents and quantum chromodynamics. Sciulli was involved in the CCFR collaboration until 1990. From 1985 he was involved with the HERA accelerator of the DESY. At Columbia University his scientific team, which included Allen Caldwell and John Parsons, worked on designing and constructing instrumentation and accumulating and analyzing data for the ZEUS experiment associated with HERA. In 2004 he retired from Columbia University as professor emeritus.

After formal retirement he continued to work on ZEUS data. He also serves on the Fermilab Board of Trustees and as co-chair of the Experimental Advisory Committee of the Sanford Underground Research Facility. In 1995 he received the Panofsky Prize. He was elected in 1982 a fellow of the American Physical Society (APS), in 1998 a fellow of the American Association for the Advancement of Science, and in 2009 a member of the National Academy of Sciences. With Mary K. Gaillard and Paul Grannis, he contributed an invited article for the APS Centenary.
