= Roberto Burioni =

Italian doctor and vaccination proponent (born 1962)

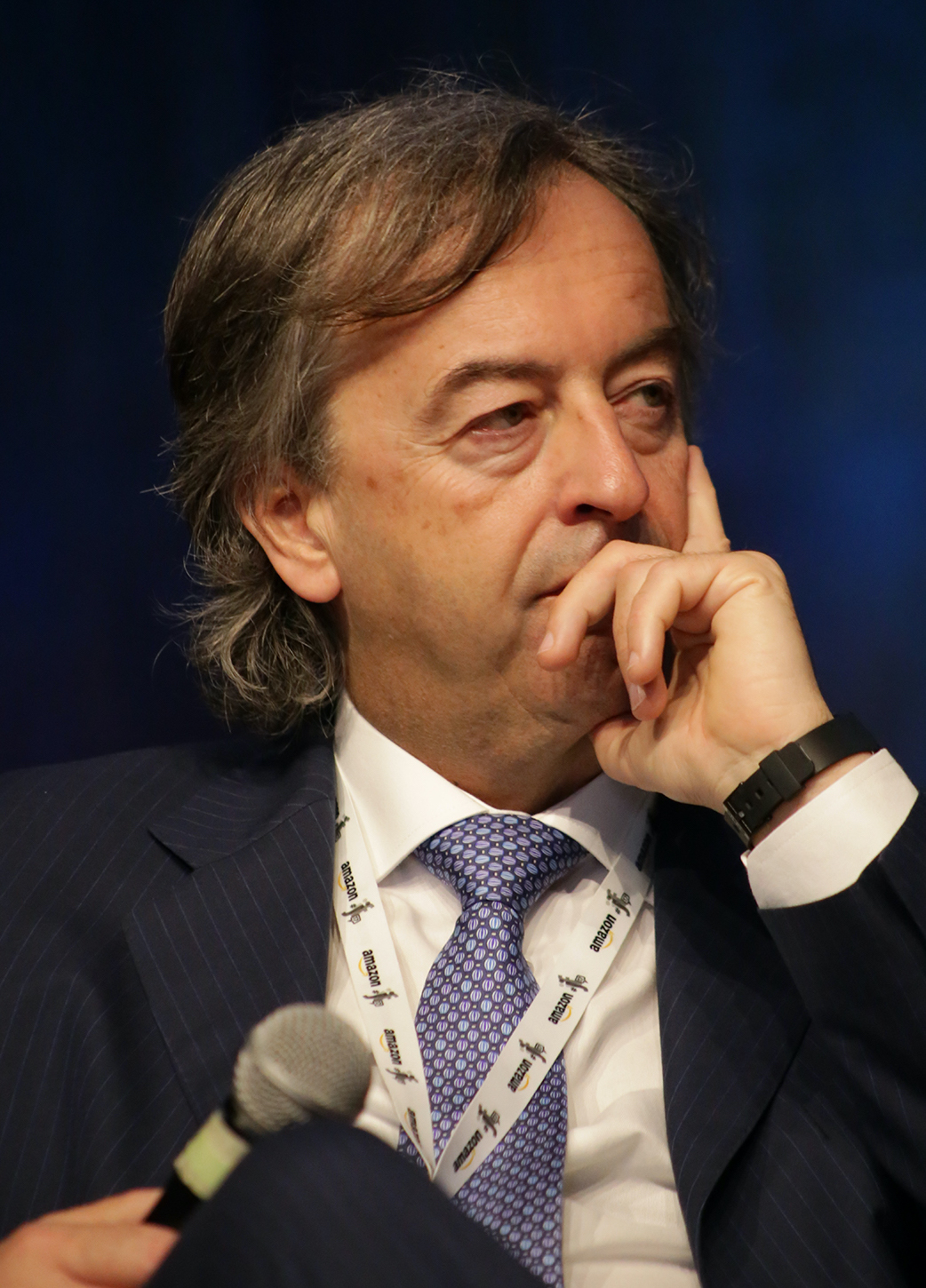
- Born: 10 December 1962 (age 63); Pesaro, Italy
- Education: Università Cattolica del Sacro Cuore (graduation); University of Genoa (PhD)
- Occupations: Medical Doctor, University professor
- Height: 1.83 m (6 ft 0 in)
- Spouse: Annalisa Rossi (m. 2009)
- Children: 1

Roberto Burioni (born 10 December 1962) is an Italian virologist, physician, and academic. A Professor of Microbiology and Virology at the Vita-Salute San Raffaele University, he runs there a lab developing human monoclonal antibodies against human infectious agents, the study of pathogen-host interplay, and the use of molecular tools in the early diagnosis of infectious diseases. A prominent virologist, Burioni has risen to fame in Italy for his strong stance against the antivaccination movement and has been described as the "most famous virologist in Italy".

== Education, career, and activism ==
=== 1980s–2004: Studies and early career ===
After graduating from the Liceo Classico Raffaello in Urbino, Burioni received his Medical Degree from the Università Cattolica del Sacro Cuore Medical School in Rome and a Ph.D. in Microbiological Sciences from the University of Genoa. He attended the Center for Disease Control in Atlanta, Georgia, and the Wistar Institute of the University of Pennsylvania as a visiting student in the laboratory of Hilary Koprowski and Carlo Maria Croce. He has been a visiting scientist at both the Center for Molecular Genetics at the University of California, San Diego, and at the Scripps Research Institute. He was appointed Assistant Professor at the Medical School of Rome's Università Cattolica del Sacro Cuore in 1995, before moving to Assistant Professor in Virology at the Medical School of the University of Ancona in 1999.

=== 2004–2016: Università Vita-Salute San Raffaele ===
Burioni moved to the medical school at the Università Vita-Salute San Raffaele in Milan in 2004, first as an Associate Professor and later as Full Professor of Microbiology and Virology. In 2010, he took the role of Director of the Board Specialty School of Microbiology and Virology which he held until 2017.

=== 2016–present day: Stand against the antivaccination movement and continuous career ===
Burioni is an active campaigner against the antivaccination movement and rose to fame in Italy after an appearance on the TV talk show Virus in 2016, on the national TV channel Rai 2. The majority of the segment was given to Red Ronnie, a DJ, and former actress Eleonora Brigliadori, both of whom hold antivaccination positions. Burioni was left with only a few minutes in which to rebut the misinformation. In response, Burioni posted to Facebook giving his version of the facts. The post was read by over 5 million people in one day. The TV show "Virus" was eventually canceled at the end of the season. Since then he has developed a large following on social media with almost 480,000 followers on Facebook and over 114,000 followers on Twitter.

In 2017, Burioni authored the book Il vaccino non è un'opinione: Le vaccinazioni spiegate a chi proprio non le vuole capire ("The Vaccine Is Not an Opinion: Vaccinations, Explained to Those Who Just Do Not Want to Understand Them"), which won the 2017 Asimov Award, an annual award established by the Gran Sasso Science Institute of L'Aquila awarded to books of science dissemination published in Italy during the previous year. In 2018, Burioni, along with several colleagues, created the website Medical Facts. Articles on the site are written by medical scientists, doctors, and other health professionals with the intent of promoting news and advice on a range of health issues.

In January 2019, Burioni launched a Pact for Science, calling on all Italian political parties to sign on and pledge to follow five points: to support science as a universal value of progress and humanity; to refuse to support or tolerate pseudoscience, pseudomedicine, and any treatments that are not based on scientific and medical evidence; to prevent pseudoscientists from creating unjustified alarm regarding health care interventions that have been scientifically and medically demonstrated to be safe; to implement programs designed to correctly inform the public about science, using experts in their fields; and to ensure that scientific research is adequately supported in terms of public financing. Many politicians signed the pledge, including Beppe Grillo, founder of the Five Star Movement, a party that has strong ties to the antivaccination movement.

Since the beginning of 2020, Burioni has been a regular guest on the Italian national television program Che tempo che fa, hosted by Fabio Fazio, which airs on Sunday evenings on the national network Rai 3, and later on Nove, where he gives short lectures on current medical and scientific topics. In January 2020, an article about Burioni was published in the news section of the journal Science, which reviewed his public outreach activities and celebrated his fight against anti-vaccination movements, presenting him as the person who has fought the most for the accuracy of medical-scientific information in Italy in recent years. In March 2021, a comprehensive article was dedicated to him in the international magazine Foreign Policy, where he was described as the Italian Anthony Fauci.

== Approach with antivaccination activists ==
Burioni is known for his matter-of-fact approach when dealing with antivaccination activists. He said: "I don't mind being curt with those who spend five minutes on Google and want to teach me about virology, which I have studied for 35 years. Science is no democracy." His stance on vaccinations led to death threats against both himself and his daughter. In June 2020, the Vaccine Confidence Project found that opposition to a COVID-19 vaccine was very low, with Burioni commenting that the antivaccination movement in Italy had nearly disappeared.

== Response to COVID-19 ==
Roberto Burioni
(@RobertoBurioni)
tweeted:

Italian:

Propongo una colletta per pagare ai novax gli abbonamenti Netflix per quando dal 5 agosto saranno agli arresti domiciliari chiusi in casa come dei sorci.

Translation:

I propose to collect money to pay anti-vaxxers' Netflix subscriptions for when, from August 5th, they will be under house arrest, locked like mice.

23 July 2021

In early February 2020, Burioni commented that COVID-19 was far more dangerous than the common flu, and that due to its highly contagious nature, it was important not to underestimate it and rather to deal with it decisively. He further cited the importance of diagnosing cases as quickly as possible and isolating people who were or might get infected. This position led to Burioni being accused of being a fascist and a supporter of the League, an Italian right-wing/far-right political party. Later the same month, Burioni again emphasised the importance of self-isolation and avoiding crowded places; he said that Italy had so far been unable to limit the rapid spread of the virus. Burioni backed the measures taken by the government COVID-19 pandemic in Italy to halt the spread of the virus, calling it an "indispensable measure".

Due to COVID-19, Burioni released his latest book, Virus. La grande sfida (Virus: The Great Challenge) in March 2020, several months earlier than originally planned. He received criticism on social media for doing this but responded saying that books on the epidemic were needed now in order to help people understand what was happening. In response to the Italian government's plans to relax COVID-19 lockdown measures from 4 May 2020, Burioni said that anyone leaving their homes should be required to wear a mask and have some form of contact tracing. He further suggested that anyone found to have COVID-19 should be isolated at a hotel or other facility rather than their home; he warned that, without these measures, COVID-19 could spread anew and result in having to start the lockdown all over again.

In March 2021, the Italian government issued a decree requiring that workers in health care facilities be vaccinated, in response to reports that up to 15% of health professionals in some major hospitals had refused to be vaccinated when it was offered to them. Burioni said that it was humiliating that medical and health workers had to be forced to be vaccinated and was concerned over the implications of the high number of health professionals refusing to do so. He suggested that the selection process used for obtaining a medical licence was not effective enough.

In July 2022, Burioni was accused of bullying a disabled girl on Twitter. As a result, some individuals, including far-right politicians, asked for Burioni's removal from RAI, and Codacons requested his expulsion from the Medical Association. Burioni was acquitted of all charges by the Italian Medical Association and thus confirmed as a permanent guest for the 2022/2023 season of RAI's Che tempo che fa.

== Awards and recognitions ==
- Jano Planco d'Oro Award, December 2017 in Rimini, awarded annually to doctors, dentists, researchers, other health professionals, bodies, associations, or to other persons who have brought prestige to health, promoting the ethical principles of medicine.
- Annual Prize for Medicine of the UNAMSI, National Scientific Medical Union of Information, 11 December 2017.
- Premio Asimov. The essay 'The vaccine is not an opinion' won the Gran Sasso Science Institute of L'Aquila 2017 Asimov Award for scientific popularization.
- Internet Revelation Character of the Year Award at the Macchianera Internet Awards, the Italian Oscars of the Net, September 2017.
- Favignana Award - Florio Festival, 16 June 2018.
- Ape d'Oro - Award of the Municipality of Segrate, Milan, September 2018.
- Best Character of the Year Award and Best Disclosure Site, Macchianera Internet Awards, the Italian Oscars of the Network, November 2018.
- Champion of Science Prize, Oscars of Goodness of the City Angels, Milan, January 2019.
- Evidence Award 2019, GIMBE Foundation, Bologna, March 2019.
- Picenum prize of the Pio Sodalizio dei Piceni Foundation, Rome, June 2019.

== Books ==
- Donnici, Rocco; Burioni, Roberto; Marinelli, Massimiliano (21 October 1998). Genetica. Valore delle biodiversità. Sfida della bioingegneria (Genetics. Value of biodiversity. Bioengineering challenge) (in Italian). Quattroventi. ISBN 9788839204615.
- Burioni, Roberto (21 October 2023). Il vaccino non è un'opinione: le vaccinazioni spiegate a chi proprio non le vuole capire (The vaccine is not an opinion: Vaccinations explained to those who just don't want to understand them) (in Italian). Mondadori. ISBN 978-8804684633.
- Burioni, Roberto (2018). La congiura dei somari: Perché la scienza non può essere democratica (The conspiracy of dunces: Why science cannot be democratic) (in Italian). Rizzoli. ISBN 978-8817104609.
- Burioni, Roberto (2018). Balle mortali: Meglio vivere con la scienza che morire coi ciarlatani (Deadly lies: Better to live with science than to die with charlatans) (in Italian). Rizzoli. ISBN 978-8817105088.
- Burioni, Roberto (21 October 2023). Omeopatia: Bugie, leggende e verità (Homeopathy: Lies, legends and truths) (in Italian). Rizzoli. ISBN 978-8817141222.
- Burioni, Roberto. Virus. La grande sfida (Virus. The Great Challenge) (in Italian). Rizzoli.
- Burioni, Roberto, La formidabile impresa. La medicina dopo la rivoluzione mRNA, (in Italian) Rizzoli, 2022, ISBN 978-8817158831
- Burioni, Roberto, Match point. Come la scienza sta sconfiggendo il cancro, (in Italian) La Nave di Teseo, 2023, ISBN 978-8834615737
