= Katsanevas =

Katsanevas is a Greek surname (Greek: Κατσανέβας). Notable people with the surname include:

- Angie Katsanevas (born 1973), American television personality
- Stavros Katsanevas (1953–2022), Greek-French physicist
- Theodore Katsanevas (1947–2021), Greek academic and politician
