= Buschhorn =

Buschhorn is a surname. Notable people with the surname include:

- Don Buschhorn (born 1946), American baseball player
- Gerd Buschhorn (1934–2010), former director of the Max Planck Institute for Physics
