= Mary K. Gaillard =

American physicist (1939–2025)

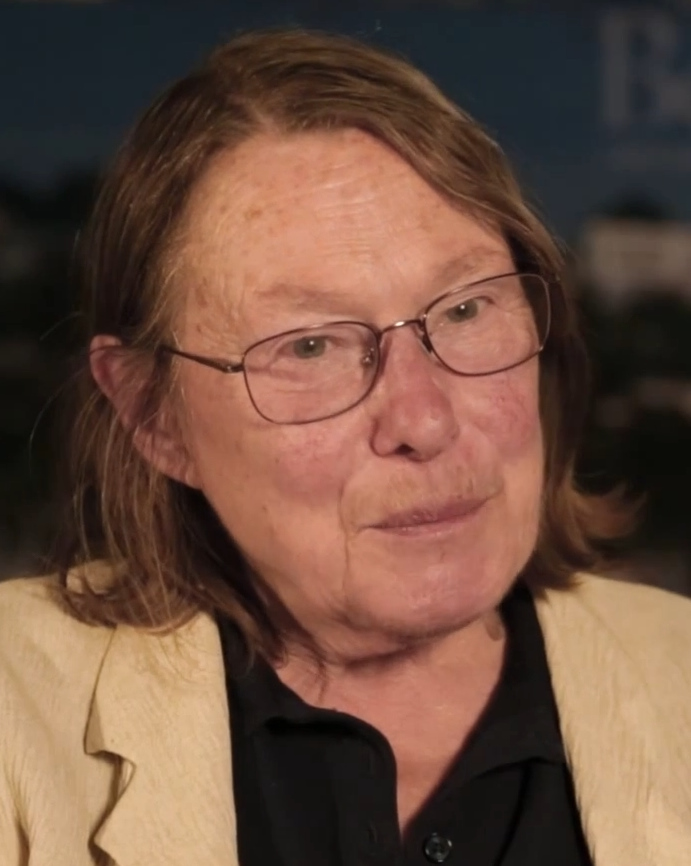
- Gaillard in 2015
- Born: Mary Katherine Ralph; April 1, 1939; New Brunswick, New Jersey, U.S.
- Died: May 23, 2025 (aged 86); Berkeley, California, U.S.
- Education: Hollins College; Columbia University; University of Paris-Sud
- Known for: Standard Model
- Spouses: Jean-Marc Gaillard (m. 1961; div. 1983) Bruno Zumino (m. 1984; died 2014)
- Children: 3
- Awards: E. O. Lawrence Award (1988); Sakurai Prize (1993)
- Scientific career
- Fields: Physics
- Workplaces: University of California, Berkeley
- Thesis: Contribution à l'étude des interactions faibles non leptoniques (1967)
- Doctoral advisor: Bernard d'Espagnat
- Doctoral students: Pierre Binétruy; Matt Visser; Guy de Téramond Peralta

External videos
- "One woman’s journey in physics", Mary K Gaillard, June 1, 2016, CERN.

Mary Katharine Gaillard (née Ralph; April 1, 1939 – May 23, 2025) was an American theoretical physicist, known for her work in particle physics. She was a professor of the graduate school at the University of California, Berkeley, a member of the Berkeley Center for Theoretical Physics, and visiting scientist at the Lawrence Berkeley National Laboratory. She was Berkeley's first tenured female physicist.

Gaillard's influential contributions included the prediction of the mass of the charm quark prior to its discovery (with Benjamin W. Lee); the prediction of 3-jet events (with John Ellis and Graham Ross); and the prediction of b-quark mass (with M.S. Chanowitz and Ellis). Gaillard's autobiography is A Singularly Unfeminine Profession, published in 2015 by World Scientific.

== Early life ==
Mary Katharine Ralph was born April 1, 1939, in New Brunswick, New Jersey, and grew up in Painesville, Ohio, where her father taught history at Lake Erie College. She took an immediate interest in physics when she began studying it in high school. The title of her memoir comes from a moment during this time, when she told a boy who lived in her neighborhood that she wanted to be a physicist; he replied by telling her it was "a singularly unfeminine profession".

She attended Hollins College in Virginia as an undergraduate. Her physics professor, Dorothy Montgomery, helped her to find work in the Louis Leprince-Ringuet laboratory in France during a year abroad, and at Brookhaven National Labs in the summer. She received her bachelor's degree from Hollins in 1960. She received her master's degree from Columbia University in 1961.

At the end of her first year at Columbia she married Jean-Marc Gaillard, a visiting physics postdoctoral student. She moved with him, first to the University of Paris at Orsay, France and a year later to the European Organization for Nuclear Research (CERN) in Geneva, Switzerland. Despite experiencing sexism and having three children, she continued to study theoretical physics. In 1964 she obtained her Doctorat du Troisième Cycle from the University of Paris at Orsay, France. In 1968, she completed her Doctorat d'Etat in Theoretical Physics there.

== Career ==
During her time at CERN (1964–1981) Gaillard was considered a visiting scientist, first as a student from Orsay, and later as a research scientist employed by the French National Centre for Scientific Research (CNRS). At one point, she carried out and submitted a survey of women scientists at CERN, documenting clear patterns of blatant sexism against women scientists in hiring and salaries.

Nonetheless, her scientific achievements at CERN led to her advancement at CNRS. In 1979 Gaillard established a particle theory group at the Laboratoire d'Annecy-le-Vieux de physique des particules (LAPP), Annecy-le-Vieux, France. From 1979 to 1981, she directed the group, which later became the Laboratoire d'Annecy-le-Vieux de Physique Théorique (LAPTh). She served as director of research at Annecy-le-Vieux for the CNRS from 1980 to 1981. In 1981, the Gaillards divorced, and she returned to the United States.

Gaillard joined the physics department at Berkeley in 1981, becoming the first woman professor of physics there. She was concurrently a faculty senior staff member at Lawrence Berkeley National Laboratory (LBNL), where she headed the Theory Group from 1985 to 1987.

Gaillard served on several committees of the American Physical Society, advisory panels for the Department of Energy and the United States National Research Council, and on advisory and visiting committees at universities and national laboratories. She was a member of the National Science Board from 1996 to 2002.

== Research ==
Her research accomplishments include pioneering work with Benjamin W. Lee on the evaluation of strong interaction corrections to weak transitions, including the successful prediction of the mass of the charm quark; work with John Ellis and others on the analysis of final states in electron-positron collisions, including the prediction of Three-jet events, and studies of unified gauge theories, including the prediction of the bottom quark mass; studies with Michael Chanowitz of signatures at proton-proton colliders which showed, on very general grounds, that new physics must show up at sufficiently high energies. Her later work focused on effective supergravity theories based on superstrings, and their implications for phenomena that may be detected both in accelerator experiments and cosmological observations.

== Personal life and death ==
She married Jean Marc Gaillard with whom she had three children – Alain, Dominique and Bruno. Later, she married Bruno Zumino. Gaillard died at her home in Berkeley, California, on May 23, 2025, at the age of 86.

== Awards and honors ==
- 1977, Prix Thibaud, Academy of Sciences, Humanities and Arts of Lyon
- 1984, Fellow of the American Physical Society
- 1988, E.O. Lawrence Memorial Award, U. S. Department of Energy
- 1989, Fellow of the American Academy of Arts and Sciences
- 1991, Member of National Academy of Sciences
- 1993, J. J. Sakurai Prize for Theoretical Particle Physics
- 2000, Member of the American Philosophical Society

== Publications ==
- Gaillard, Mary K. (July 2015). A Singularly Unfeminine Profession: One Woman's Journey in Physics (1st hardcover ed.). Singapore: World Scientific Publishing Company. Bibcode:2015sup..book.....G. doi:10.1142/9443. ISBN 978-981-4644-22-8. OCLC 898167730.
