= Max Planck Institute for Physics =

Research institute in Munich, Germany

- Max-Planck-Institut für Physik
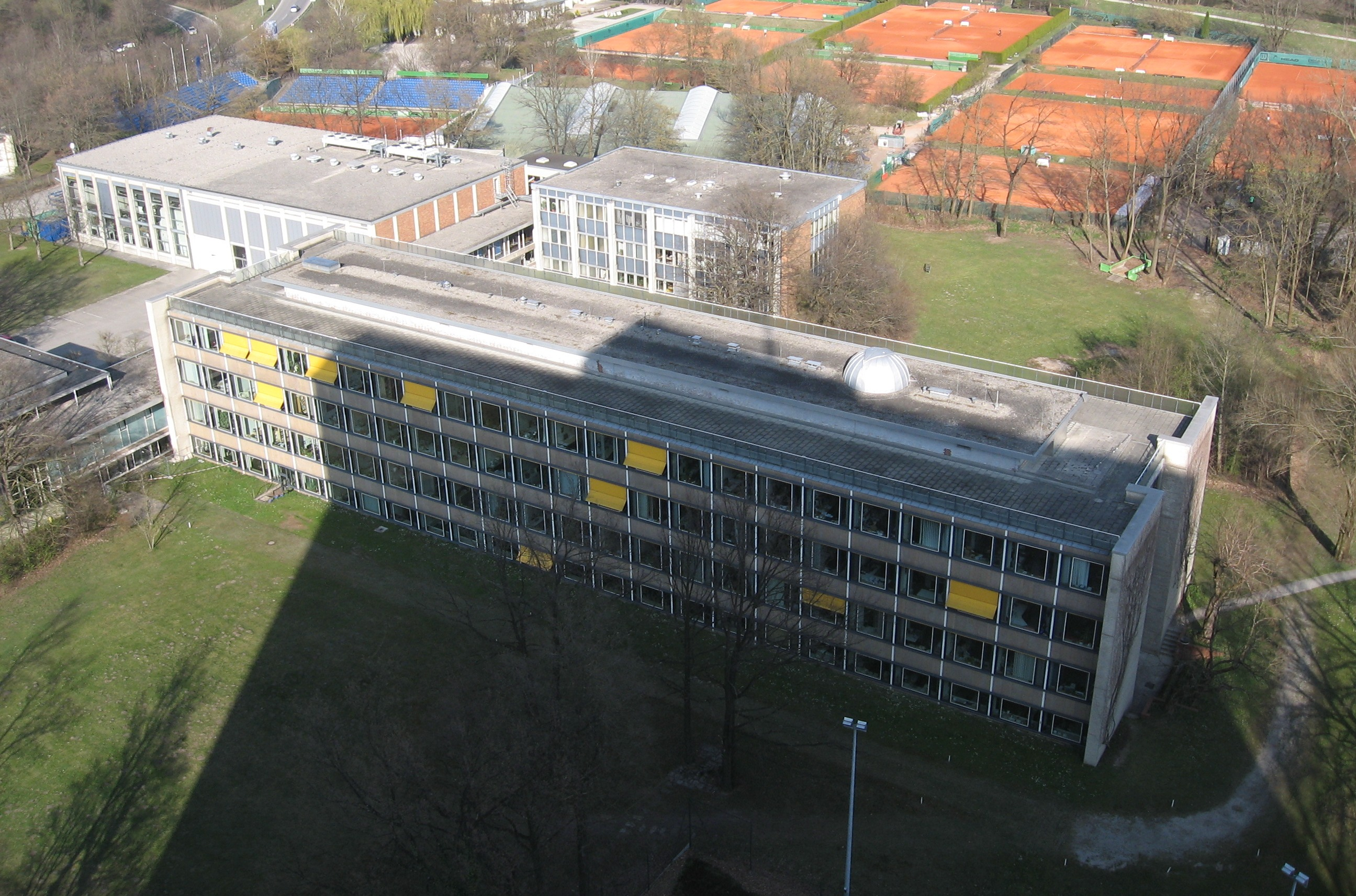
- Former name: Kaiser Wilhelm Institute for Physics (1917–1946); Max Planck Institute for Physics (1946–1958); Max Planck Institute for Physics and Astrophysics (1958–1991)
- Established: 1 October 1917; 108 years ago
- Research type: Basic research
- Field of research: Astronomy, astrophysics, particle physics, plasma physics, quantum mechanics
- Director: Giulia Zanderighi
- Staff: 330
- Location: Boltzmannstr. 8, Garching bei München, Bavaria, Germany; 48°15′45″N 11°40′16″E
- Operating agency: Max Planck Society
- Website: www.mpp.mpg.de

The Max Planck Institute for Physics (MPP) is a research institute located in Garching, near Munich, Germany. It specializes in high energy physics and astroparticle physics. The MPP is part of the Max Planck Society and is also known as the Werner Heisenberg Institute, after its first director in its current location.

The founding of the institute traces back to 1914, as an idea from Fritz Haber, Walther Nernst, Max Planck, Emil Warburg, Heinrich Rubens. On October 1, 1917, the institute was officially founded in Berlin as Kaiser-Wilhelm-Institut für Physik (KWIP, Kaiser Wilhelm Institute for Physics) with Albert Einstein as the first head director. In October 1922, Max von Laue succeeded Einstein as managing director. Einstein gave up his position as a director of the institute in April 1933. The Institute took part in the German nuclear weapon project from 1939 to 1942.

In June 1942, Werner Heisenberg took over as managing director. A year after the end of fighting in Europe in World War II, the institute was moved to Göttingen and renamed the Max Planck Institute for Physics, with Heisenberg continuing as managing director. In 1946, Carl Friedrich von Weizsäcker and Karl Wirtz joined the faculty as the directors for theoretical and experimental physics, respectively.

In 1955 the institute made the decision to move to Munich, and soon after began construction of its current building, designed by Sep Ruf. The institute moved into its current location on September 1, 1958, and took on the new name the Max Planck Institute for Physics and Astrophysics, still with Heisenberg as the managing director. In 1991, the institute was split into the Max Planck Institute for Physics, the Max Planck Institute for Astrophysics and the Max Planck Institute for Extraterrestrial Physics.

== Structure ==
There are three departments with multiple research groups:

- Structure of matter
  - Innovative calculation methods in particle physics (Giulia Zanderighi)
  - Quantum field theory and scattering amplitudes (Johannes Henn)
  - String theory (Dieter Lüst)
  - ATLAS detector (Siegfried Bethke)
  - Belle II experiment (Hans-Günther Moser)
  - Gravitational theory (Angnis Schmidt-May)
- New technologies
  - AWAKE – Plasma Wakefield Acceleration (Patric Muggli)
  - ILC and CLIC: Linear Colliders (Frank Simon)
- Astroparticle physics
  - Particle physics and cosmology (Georgi Dvali)
  - Theoretical astroparticle physics (Georg G. Raffelt)
  - COSINUS experiment (Karoline Schäffner)
  - CRESST experiment (Federica Petricca)
  - GERDA and LEGEND: the nature of the neutrino (Allen Caldwell)
  - KATRIN and TRISTAN: Neutrinos and dark matter (Susanne Mertens)
  - MADMAX experiment: searching for axion dark matter (Béla Majorovits)
  - MAGIC and CTA: Gamma ray telescopes (Masahiro Teshima)

== Current and former directors ==
The current directorial board of the institute is

- Allen Caldwell
- Giorgi Dvali
- Johannes Henn
- Marumi Kado
- Dieter Lüst
- Masahiro Teshima
- Giulia Zanderighi (current managing director)

Former directors of the institute include:

- Siegfried Bethke
- Ludwig Biermann
- Heinz Billing
- Gerd Buschhorn
- Peter Debye
- Hans-Peter Dürr
- Albert Einstein
- Gerhard von Gierke
- Fritz Haber
- Werner Heisenberg
- Leon Van Hove
- Max von Laue
- Walther Nernst
- Max Planck
- Heinrich Rubens
- Norbert Schmitz
- Leo Stodolsky
- Emil Warburg
- Carl Friedrich von Weizsäcker
- Karl Wirtz
