= Cryogenic Observatory for Signatures Seen in Next-Generation Underground Searches =

The Cryogenic Observatory for SIgnatures seen in Next-generation Underground Searches (COSINUS) is a scientific collaboration aimed at developing cryogenic detectors for the direct detection of dark matter, particularly in relation to results observed by other experiments like DAMA/LIBRA. The goal of COSINUS is to confirm or refute these results by using different detection techniques while maintaining high sensitivity to dark matter interactions.

The participating institutes in the COSINUS collaboration include the Max Planck Institute for Physics (Germany), the Gran Sasso Science Institute (Italy), the Helsinki Institute of Physics (Finland), the Institute of High Energy Physics (Austria), the Technical University of Vienna (Austria), the University of L'Aquila (Italy), the Istituto Nazionale di Fisica Nucleare (Italy), and the Shanghai Institute of Ceramics, Chinese Academy of Sciences (China). The experiment is conducted in the underground laboratory of the Gran Sasso National Laboratory (LNGS) in Italy, which provides the necessary shielding from cosmic radiation and environmental interference for the detection of rare dark matter interactions.

Similar to CRESST, COSINUS utilizes cryogenic detectors that operate at temperatures of a few millikelvin to achieve high energy resolution. The detectors are designed to measure both phonon (heat) and photon (light) signals, using scintillating sodium iodide (NaI) crystals, to discriminate between dark matter signals and background noise.

COSINUS was inaugurated in Spring 2024 and will start recording data in end of 2025.
