= Sigfried Bethke =

German physicist and science manager

Sigfried Bethke (born 15 April 1954 in Ludwigshafen am Rhein) is a German physicist and science manager.

== Life ==
=== Scientific career ===
Siegfried Bethke studied at Heidelberg University in Heidelberg, where he received his doctorate in 1983 and his habilitation in 1987. In 1987/88 he spent a research stay at the Lawrence Berkeley National Laboratory as a Feodor Lynen fellow of the Alexander von Humboldt Foundation. Subsequently, he did research at CERN, the European Organization for Nuclear Research, as a Heisenberg Fellow of the German Research Foundation. In 1993 he was appointed professor of experimental physics at the RWTH Aachen University, where he held a chair at the III Physics Institute until 1999. In 1999 he became a "Scientific Member" of the Max Planck Society and Director at the Max Planck Institute for Physics in Munich, where he was managing director from 2000 to 2005. In 2000, he was appointed honorary professor at the Technical University of Munich. Since January 2013, he has been managing director of the Max Planck Semiconductor Laboratory in Munich-Neuperlach.

=== Research activities ===
Bethke's research focuses on the investigation of high-energy particle collisions at particle accelerators and the development of particle detectors to detect these collisions. He is responsible for the activities of the MPI for Physics within the ATLAS experiment at the LHC of CERN. He is the Director responsible for the activities of the Max Planck Institute for Physics within the ATLAS collaboration at CERN's LHC. Bethke and his research groups were instrumental in the discovery of the Higgs boson particle in 2012. Bethke also contributes to the experimental verification of quantum chromodynamics.

== Awards and memberships ==
Bethke was awarded the Gottfried Wilhelm Leibniz Prize of the German Research Foundation in 1995. Since 1999, he has been co-organizer of the annual "School for High Energy Physics" at the Maria Laach Abbey. From 1995 to 2002, he was a member of the expert committee for High Energy Physics of the German Federal Ministry of Education and Research. From 2000 to 2004, he was a member of the Scientific Advisory Board of the DESY in Hamburg, where he was chair from 2002 to 2004. From 2007 to 2012, he was editor-in-chief of the European Physical Journal C. In 2008, he was appointed chair of the scientific advisory board of the Institute for High Energy Physics HEPHY in Vienna, which he held until 2014. From 2009 to 2020, he was the German scientific representative to the CERN Council. From 2012 to 2020, he represented Germany in the European Strategy Group of this committee. From 2013 to 2017, he was a member of the management board of the German Physical Society (DPG). In 2016 and 2017, he performed the same role in the European Physical Society. Since 2018, he has been a member of the PRISMA Forum, an advisory committee of the German Federal Ministry of Education and Research.
