= COBRA Experiment =

Cadmium Zinc Telluride 0-Neutrino Double-Beta Research Apparatus
- Research type: Particle physics, Astrophysics
- Location: L'Aquila, Abruzzo, Italy; 42.454°N 13.576°E
- Operating agency: INFN
- Website: www.cobra-experiment.org

The Cadmium Zinc Telluride 0-Neutrino Double-Beta (COBRA) experiment is a large array of cadmium zinc telluride (CdZnTe) semiconductors searching for evidence of neutrinoless double beta decay and to measure its half-life. COBRA is located underground within the Gran Sasso National Laboratory. The experiment was proposed in 2001, and installation of a large prototype began in 2006.

== Set up ==
COBRA is designed to prove the validity of the CdZnTe detection technique. The initial setup of the experiment, in 2007, was an array of four 1-cm^{3} CdZnTe semiconductors. This was then upgraded to 64 detectors in a 4×4×4 array. The CdZnTe crystals act as both the detector and source material, as nine of the isotopes in this material are double beta decay candidates. The location of the experiment allows for shielding from external gamma rays; to this end, the detectors are also shielded by 5 cm of radiopure electrolytic copper and 20 cm of low-radioactivity lead. 7 cm of boron-loaded polyethylene shields the experiment against neutrons, and the experiment is constantly flushed with nitrogen gas to prevent contamination with radon.

== Results ==
As of 2016, COBRA had collected about 250 kg days of calibrated exposure. Efforts were focused on reducing the background readings in order to increase the sensitivity of the experiment.
