= Allen Caldwell =

German physicist

Allen Caldwell is one of currently seven directors of the Max Planck Institute for Physics. He became director in 2002.

== Early life and education ==
Allen Caldwell was born in Verdun, France in 1959 and has dual US and French citizenship. He studied physics first at Rice University in Texas (USA), later at the University of Wisconsin, where he also received his doctorate.

== Career ==
He spent the following 15 years at Columbia University primarily pursuing research into proton structure and related topics. In 2002 he joined the Max Planck Institute for Physics as a director. Since 2004 he has been involved in the search for neutrino less double beta decay. His current accelerator research activities focus on plasma Wakefield acceleration. AWAKE, a demonstration experiment, is under preparation in CERN. Caldwell also takes a keen interested in probability, statistics and data analysis techniques and teaches these subjects at TUM. He has been managing director of the Max Planck Institute for Physics since April 2012.

In his work, Caldwell is primarily concerned with the development of new particle accelerator technologies based on plasma keel fields and with the investigation of quarks and gluons and their interactions. In addition, there is research into the fundamental properties of neutrinos and the search for new dark matter candidates – the axions. He is also particularly interested in probability calculations and statistical methods: he gives lectures on data analysis techniques and Monte Carlo methods at the Technical University of Munich.

== Research priorities ==
Caldwell is concerned with the study of the fundamental building blocks of matter, their properties and their interactions.

He is involved in the following research projects:

- The AWAKE experiment - acceleration with plasma waves (CERN)
- MADMAX: Search for axions as dark matter
- LEGEND: the nature of the neutrino (LNGS, Italy)
- The Belle II Experiment (KEK, Japan)

== Offices ==
- Representative of the Max Planck Society in the Committee for Particle Physics (KET, since 2018)
- International Review Committee, Canadian Institute of Particle Physics (2016)
- Advisory member, DIS and Related Topics (since 2007)
- Scientific Advisory Board, Annals of Physics
- Member of the Perspectives Commission of the CPT Section of the Max Planck Society (since 2012)

== Functions ==
- Spokesperson, AWAKE Collaboration (since 2012)
- Director, Max Planck Institute for Physics (since 2002)
- Professor, Columbia University, New York (2002-2003)
- Director, Nevis Laboratories (1999-2002)
- Spokesperson, ZEUS Collaboration (1997-1999)

== Awards ==
- Distinguished Alumnus Award, U. Wisconsin (2012)
- Fellow of the American Physical Society (2000)
- Alexander von Humboldt Fellow (1995)

== Publications ==
Acceleration of electrons in the plasma wakefield of a proton bunch; AWAKE Collaboration (E. Adli (Oslo U.) et al.). Aug 29, 2018. 5 pp. Published in Nature 561 (2018) no.7723, 363-367

Is the bump significant? An axion-search example; Frederik Beaujean (Munich, Tech. U., Universe), Allen Caldwell, Olaf Reimann (Munich, Max Planck Inst.). Oct 18, 2017. 18 pp. Published in Eur.Phys.J. C78 (2018) no.9, 793

Global Bayesian analysis of neutrino mass data; Allen Caldwell, Alexander Merle, Oliver Schulz, Maximilian Totzauer (Munich, Max Planck Inst.). May 4, 2017. 15 pp.; Published in Phys.Rev. D96 (2017) no.7, 073001

Dielectric Haloscopes: A New Way to Detect Axion Dark Matter; MADMAX Working Group (Allen Caldwell (Munich, Max Planck Inst.) et al.). Nov 17, 2016. 6 pp.; Published in Phys.Rev.Lett. 118 (2017) no.9, 091801
