= CERN Neutrinos to Gran Sasso =

Neutrino experiment

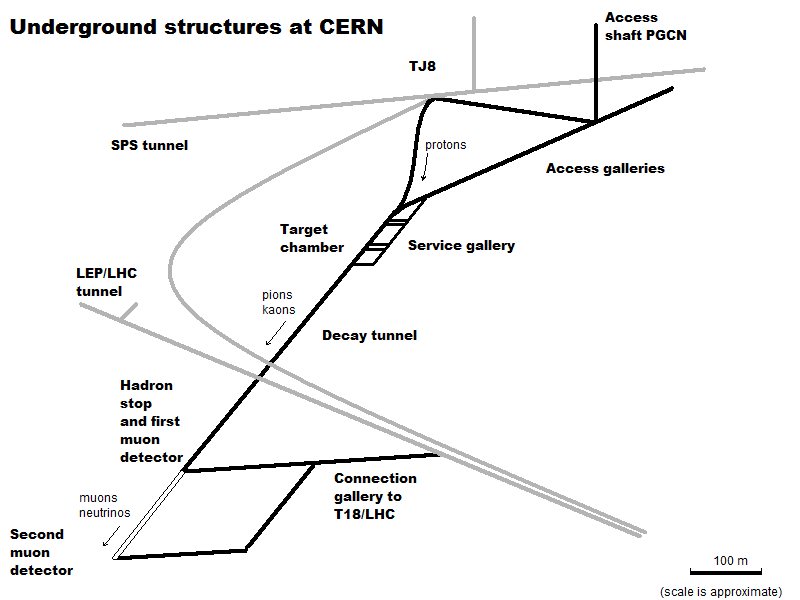
CERN Neutrinos to Gran Sasso Underground Structures

The CERN Neutrinos to Gran Sasso (CNGS) project was a physics project of the European Organization for Nuclear Research (CERN). The aim of the project was to analyse the hypothesis of neutrino oscillation by directing a beam of neutrinos from CERN's facilities to the detector of the OPERA experiment at the Gran Sasso National Laboratory (LNGS), located in the Gran Sasso mountain in Italy. The CNGS facility was housed in a tunnel which diverged from one of the SPS–LHC transfer tunnels, at the Franco–Swiss border near Geneva. It used the Super Proton Synchrotron (SPS) accelerator as a source of high-energy protons.

== History ==
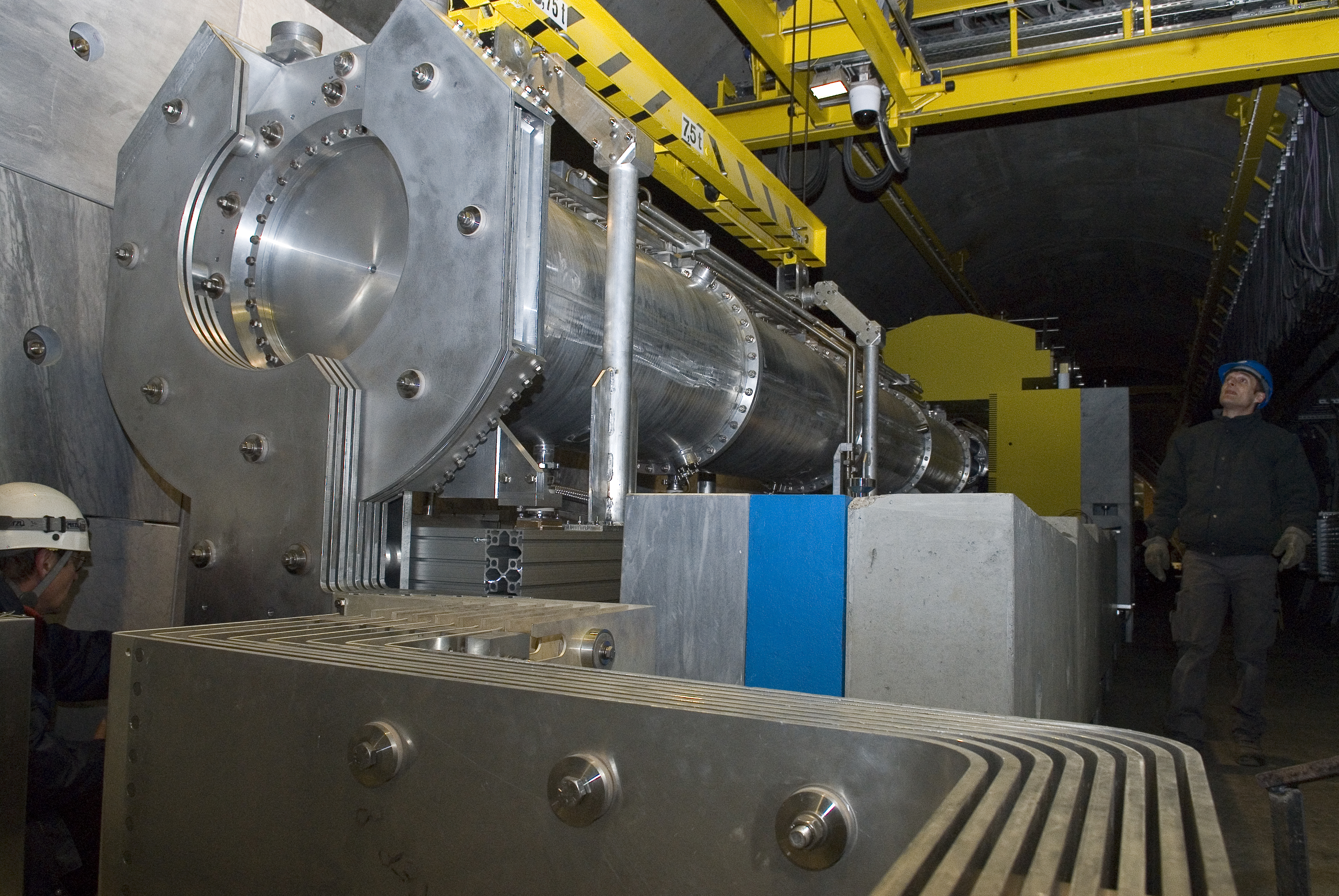
The magnetic horn being installed in the CNGS target chamber

Approval for the CNGS project was signed by the CERN Council in December 1999, with civil engineering on the project starting the following September. Construction of the tunnels and service caverns was completed in mid-2004, with equipment installation completed in summer 2005 and commissioning being carried out throughout spring 2006. The first proton beam was sent to the target on 11 July 2006, with the CNGS facility being approved for physics operations on 18 August 2006. CNGS ceased operation in 2012. The tunnel was then repurposed for the AWAKE experiment, which became operational in 2016.

== Function ==
A proton beam was taken from the SPS at 400 GeV and made to collide with a graphite target within the CNGS tunnel. The resulting particles, most importantly kaons and pions among many other particles, were then focused by magnetic lensing and travelled 1 kilometre (0.62 mi) down the CNGS tunnel in a vacuum tube. These particles are naturally unstable, and within the tunnel decayed to particles including muons and muon neutrinos. All particles except neutrinos (protons, muons, pions, kaons...) stopped near the end of the tunnel. The neutrinos continued their flight unaffected, as they rarely interact with matter. The number of muons was measured at this point, which gave an indication of the beam's profile and intensity. This beam then passed 732 kilometres (455 mi) through the crust of the Earth, and during flight some of the muon neutrinos converted into other neutrino types such as tau neutrinos. Once the beam arrived at Gran Sasso, the OPERA and ICARUS experiments were used to detect the neutrinos.

== Results ==
The first candidates for neutrino oscillation to tau neutrinos were announced in May 2010 by the OPERA experiment. In total five tau neutrinos were observed, consistent with the expectations from the theory of neutrino oscillation.

On 22 September 2011, the OPERA collaboration garnered international attention when they released a preprint reporting the Faster-than-light neutrino anomaly, wherein neutrinos were measured to be travelling, on average, at faster-than-light speed. On 24 February 2012, the team said they had discovered two problems with their previous test, muddying the validity of the previous result. The preprint has been modified to account for these facts, and indeed the measurement of the neutrino speed, there reported, agrees with the velocity of the light.
