= Grand Accélérateur National d'Ions Lourds =

Physics accelerator facility in Caen, France

Coordinates: 49°12′52″N 0°21′38″W

The Grand Accélérateur National d'Ions Lourds (GANIL), or Large Heavy Ion National Accelerator, is a French national nuclear physics research center in Caen. The facility has been in operation since 1983 and consists primarily of two serialised synchrocyclotrons. It is a part of the French Alternative Energies and Atomic Energy Commission (CEA) and Centre National de la Recherche Scientifique (CNRS).

== History ==
The accelerator construction project began in 1973. The construction of the laboratory was approved in 1975, and the first experiment using an accelerated heavy-ion beam (argon beam) was carried out in 1983. The gradual increase in energy and intensity of the ion beams available at GANIL opened up, in the mid-1990s, a new field of study focused on the properties of so-called "exotic" nuclei — nuclei that do not exist naturally on Earth. In 2001, a new exotic ion production device was commissioned: the SPIRAL installation.

== SPIRAL2 ==
The construction of a new installation called "SPIRAL2" was officially decided in 2006. In its first phase, the SPIRAL2 project provided GANIL with a linear accelerator (LINAC) to accelerate lighter nuclei (protons, deuterons, helium) than the GANIL cyclotrons. It also accelerates heavy ions up to nickel, at intensities 10 times greater than those currently available.

== DESIR ==
In November 2023, construction began on a new experimental hall at the site, named DESIR (Decay, Excitation and Storage of Radioactive Ions). In addition to GANIL, four CNRS laboratories are leading and participating in the design and construction of the instruments for the DESIR hall: the IJCLab in Orsay, the IPHC in Strasbourg, the LP2i in Bordequx, and the LPC in Caen.

== See also ==
Projects:

- Fazia
- SPIRAL
- SPIRAL2

Similar facilities:

- GSI, Germany
- Riken, Japan
- NSCL, USA
- Dubna, Russia
- CERN, Switzerland
- TRIUMF, Canada
