= Leo Stodolsky =

German physicist

Leo Stodolsky is an American physicist. He is the former director of the Max Planck Institute for Physics.
