= Laboratoire d'Annecy de physique des particules =

French physics laboratory

Coordinates: 45°55′15″N 6°09′35″E

The Laboratoire d'Annecy de physique des particules (in English the Annecy Particle Physics Laboratory), usually abbreviated as LAPP, is a French experimental physics laboratory located in Annecy in the Haute-Savoie department of France. It is associated with both the French particle and nuclear physics institute IN2P3, a subdivision of the CNRS research council, and the Université Savoie Mont Blanc.

The research activity of LAPP is historically linked with CERN, the European particle physics laboratory located near Geneva approximately 50 km from LAPP with past and current experimental involvements including ATLAS, LHCb, OPERA and BaBar experiments.

However, the laboratory has diversified beyond accelerator-based experiments into fields such as astroparticle physics (with the AMS attached to the International Space Station, the High Energy Stereoscopic System experiment and the Cherenkov Telescope Array), neutrino physics or gravitational wave detection (with the Virgo Interferometer experiment).
