= Giulia Zanderighi =

Italian theoretical physicist

- Born: 1974 (age 51–52)
- Education: University of Pavia
- Known for: Collider Phenomenology
- Scientific career
- Fields: Theoretical Physics
- Workplaces: Durham University; Fermilab; CERN; University of Oxford; Max Planck Institute for Physics

Giulia Zanderighi is an Italian-born theoretical physicist born in 1974 in Milan, Italy. She is the first woman director at the Max Planck Institute for Physics.

== Education ==
Giulia Zanderighi received her undergraduate degree from the University of Milan in 1998 and her PhD in physics from the University of Pavia in 2001.

== Career ==
Zanderighi held postdoctoral positions at Durham University at the Institute for Particle Physics Phenomenology in Durham (UK) from 2001 to 2003, Fermilab in Batavia (USA) from 2003 to 2005, and became a fellow in the theoretical department at CERN from 2005 to 2007. In 2007, she became an assistant professor at the University of Oxford, and in 2014 she became a Professor of Physics there and Tutorial Fellow at Wadham College in 2007. In 2014 she took a leave from this position, holding in a five-year staff position at CERN. On January 1, 2019, she was appointed director at the Max Planck Institute for Physics. She leads the department of novel computational techniques in particle phenomenology and is the first woman director at the institute in its more than 100-year history. She is an internationally recognized expert in collider phenomenology.
