= Gran Sasso Science Institute =

International school in L'Aquila, Italy

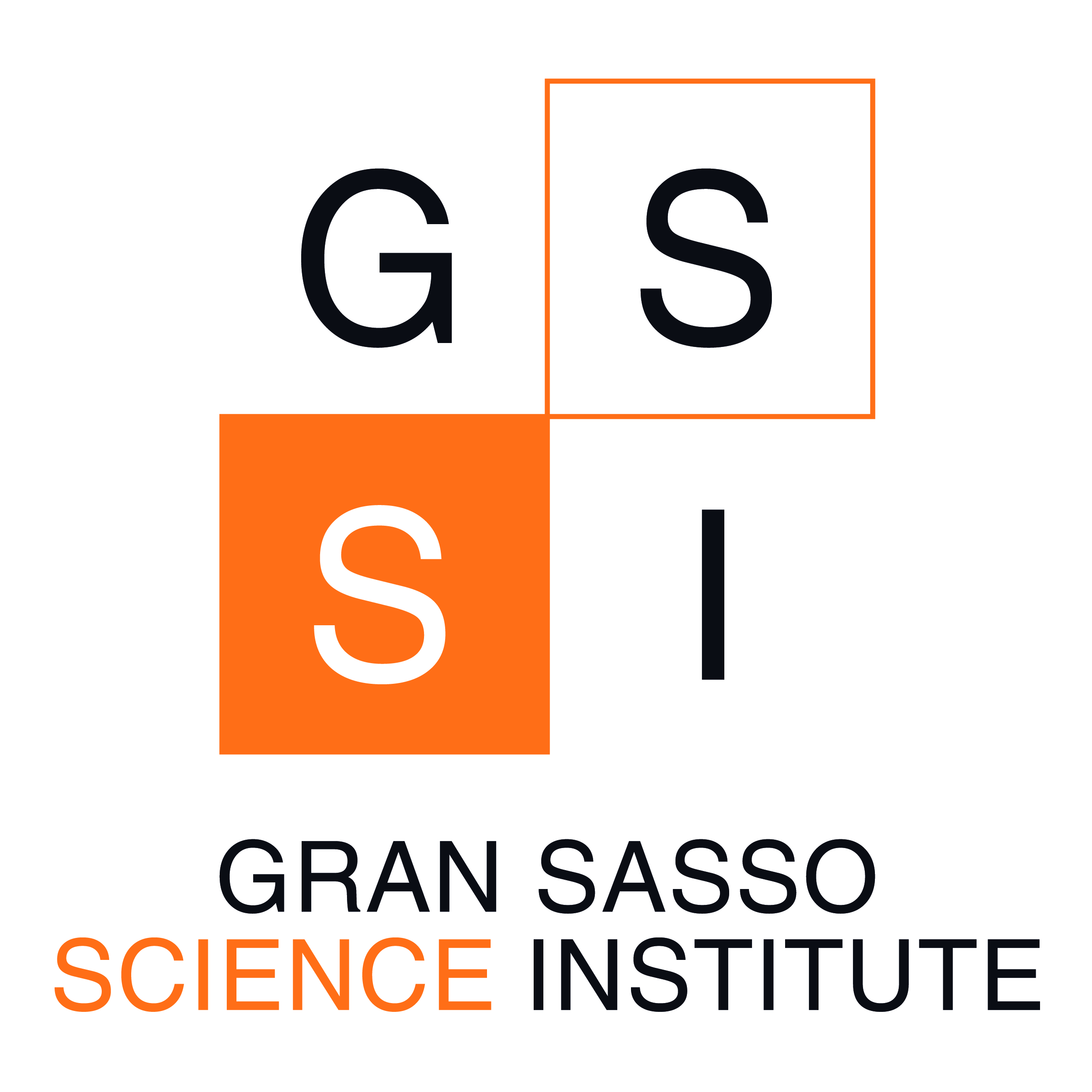
- Established: 2012
- Rector: Paola Inverardi, Eugenio Coccia (2016 - 2022)
- Postgraduates: 160 (2018)
- Location: Viale Francesco Crispi, 7, 67100 L'Aquila, Italy Rectorate Via Michele Iacobucci, 2, 67100 L'Aquila, Italy
- Website: www.gssi.it

The Gran Sasso Science Institute (GSSI) is an international school for advanced studies located in L'Aquila, Italy.

== History ==
Founded in 2012 as a research institute and superior graduate school dependent on the National Institute of Nuclear Physics (INFN), the academic institution has been made autonomous in 2016.

The institute was first proposed after the earthquake in L'Aquila of 2009, when the Ministry of Economy and Finance and the Organisation for Economic Co-operation and Development (OECD) organized several meetings to plan the economic revitalization of the area. A proposal was made to establish an educational institution for the purposes of teaching and research which would make use of the National Laboratories of Gran Sasso of the National Institute of Nuclear Physics located right near the capital of Abruzzo.

The GSSI was officially established in 2012 and later activated in the academic year 2013 – 2014. Among its founders are the academics Eugenio Coccia, appointed the first director of the institute, Paola Inverardi and Pierangelo Marcati. The inauguration took place on 14 November 2013 in the presence of Prime Minister Enrico Letta, and the Nobel Prize in Physics Carlo Rubbia.

The institute initially operated on a trial basis as an international post graduate teaching and research institute with a special statute supported by the INFN, the University of L'Aquila, the IMT of Lucca, the International School for Advanced Studies of Trieste and the Sant'Anna School of Advanced Studies of Pisa. In 2015 the activities of the 2012–2015 period were evaluated by the National Agency of the University System Evaluation and Research (ANVUR), which concluded with a positive assessment of the research institute. This lead, on 25 March 2016, to the establishment of the University through a special decree of the Council of Ministers. 8 August 2016 the director, Eugenio Coccia, was appointed rector of the university.

== Research areas ==
The research activities of the Gran Sasso Science institute focus on four main areas, namely Astroparticle Physics, Computer Science, Mathematics for Natural, Life and Social Sciences and Regional Sciences and Economic Geography. The official language of the institute is English. The Ph.D. programs provided by the institute are characterised by an average duration of 4 years. Apart from the courses that constitute an integrating part of the Ph.D. programs, several seminars given by international lecturers are held at the institute.

== Admission procedure ==
Each year the Gran Sasso Science Institute awards an average of 40 Ph.D. positions, 10 for each research area of the GSSI. The applications are evaluated by four selection committees, one for each Ph.D. program. The admission to the Ph.D. programs is based on the academic background, skills, scientific value and general aptitude to research of the applicants with respect to the subjects of the interdisciplinary programs. The selected Ph.D. students are awarded with a fellowship, free accommodation at the GSSI facilities and use of a canteen. In 2017 more than 1400 applications were submitted, most of which from abroad, making the GSSI the institute with the highest number of international applications in Italy and one of the most attractive research centers in Europe.

== Asimov Prize ==
The Asimov Prize is a literary-scientific award organised by the INFN in collaboration with the GSSI graduate school.
