= Laboratori Nazionali del Gran Sasso =

Physics laboratory in Assergi, Italy

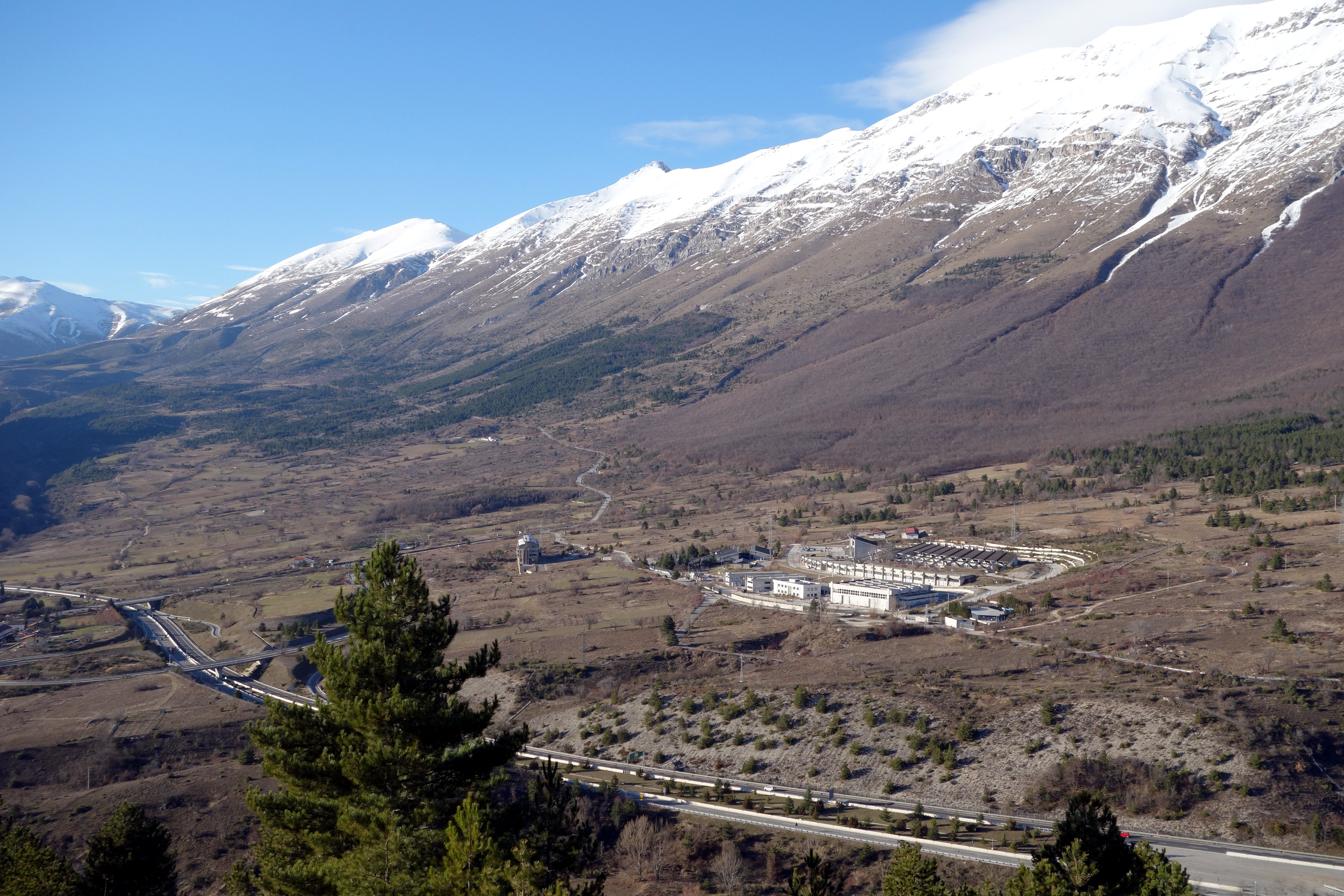
- Overview of overground laboratories of LNGS
- Established: 1985
- Research type: Particle physics, nuclear physics
- Director: Ezio Previtali (since October 2020)
- Location: L'Aquila, Abruzzo, Italy; 42°25′16″N 13°30′59″E
- Operating agency: INFN
- Website: www.lngs.infn.it

Laboratori Nazionali del Gran Sasso (LNGS) is the largest underground research center in the world. Situated below Gran Sasso mountain in Italy, it is well known for particle physics research by the INFN. In addition to a surface portion of the laboratory, there are extensive underground facilities beneath the mountain. The nearest towns are L'Aquila and Teramo. The facility is located about 120 km from Rome.

The primary mission of the laboratory is to host experiments that require a low background environment in the fields of astroparticle physics and nuclear astrophysics and other disciplines that can profit off its characteristics and of its infrastructures. The LNGS is, like the three other European underground astroparticle laboratories (Laboratoire Souterrain de Modane, Laboratorio subterráneo de Canfranc, and Boulby Underground Laboratory), a member of the coordinating group ILIAS.

== History ==
Gran Sasso National Laboratories were conceived in 1979 by the then president of the National Institute of Nuclear Physics, Professor Antonino Zichichi, who was able to take advantage of the excavations already underway for the construction of the motorway tunnel under the Gran Sasso massif. Zichichi convinced the then President of the Senate, Amintore Fanfani (Christian Democracy party), to quickly set up the Public Works Commission.

Work began in 1982 and was completed in 1985, while the research center became fully operational in 1987 with the first experiment called MACRO.

== Facilities ==
The laboratory consists of a surface facility, located within the Gran Sasso and Monti della Laga National Park, and extensive underground facilities located next to the 10 km long Traforo del Gran Sasso freeway tunnel.

The first large experiments at LNGS ran in 1989; the facilities were later expanded, and it is now the largest underground laboratory in the world.

There are three main barrel vaulted experimental halls, each approximately 20 m wide, 18 m tall, and 100 m long. These provide roughly 3×20×100=6,000 m^{2} (65,000 ft^{2}) of floor space and 3×20×(8+10×π/4)×100=95,100 m^{3} (3,360,000 ft^{3}) of volume. Including smaller spaces and various connecting tunnels, the facility totals 17,800 m^{2} (192,000 ft^{2}) and 180,000 m^{3} (6,400,000 ft^{3}).

The experimental halls are covered by about 1400 m of rock, protecting the experiments from cosmic rays. Providing about 3400 metres of water equivalent (mwe) shielding, it is not the deepest underground laboratory, but the fact that it can be driven to without using mine elevators makes it very popular.

== Research projects ==
=== Neutrino research ===
Since late August 2006, CERN has directed a beam of muon neutrinos from the CERN SPS accelerator to the Gran Sasso lab, 730 km away, where they are detected by the OPERA and ICARUS detectors, in a study of neutrino oscillations that will improve on the results of the Fermilab to MINOS experiment.

In May 2010, Lucia Votano, Director of the Gran Sasso laboratories, announced, "The OPERA experiment has reached its first goal: the detection of a tau neutrino obtained from the transformation of a muon neutrino, which occurred during the journey from Geneva to the Gran Sasso Laboratory." This was the first observed tau neutrino candidate event in a muon neutrino beam, providing further evidence that neutrinos have mass. (Research first determined that neutrinos have mass in 1998 at the Super-Kamiokande neutrino detector.) Neutrinos must have mass for this transformation to occur; this is a deviation from the classic Standard Model of particle physics, which assumed that neutrinos are massless.

An effort to determine the Majorana/Dirac nature of the neutrino, called CUORE (Cryogenic Underground Observatory for Rare Events), is operating in the laboratory (as of 2018). The detector is shielded with lead recovered from an ancient Roman shipwreck, due to the ancient lead's lower radioactivity than recently minted lead. The artifacts were given to CUORE from the National Archaeological Museum in Cagliari.

In September 2011, Dario Autiero, a researcher of Institute of Nuclear Physics in Lyon, France, presented preliminary findings that indicated neutrinos produced at CERN were arriving at OPERA detector about 60 ns earlier than they would if they were travelling at the speed of light. This faster-than-light neutrino anomaly was not immediately explained. The results were subsequently investigated and confirmed to be wrong. They were caused by a flawed optic fiber cable in OPERA receiver of the laboratory, resulting in late arrival of the clock signal to which the neutrinos' arrivals were compared. Although the official statement published by OPERA does not declare any anomaly in the velocity of the neutrinos, and therefore the case is completely solved, the development of the story has given the community pause for thought.

In 2014 Borexino measured directly, for the first time, the neutrinos from the primary proton-proton fusion process in the Sun. This result is published on Nature. This measurement is consistent with the expectations derived from the standard solar model of J. Bahcall along with the theory of solar neutrino oscillations as described by MSW theory. In 2020 Borexino measured also solar neutrinos originated from CNO cycle, a fusion process common in giant stars but uncommon in the Sun (only 1% of Sun's energy output). With this outcome Borexino has unraveled both the two processes powering the Sun and many main sequence stars.

=== Experiments ===
- BOREXINO (finished)
- COBRA
- COSINUS
- CRESST
- CUORE/Cuoricino
- DAMA/LIBRA (Formerly DAMA/NaI)
- GALLEX (finished)
- GNO (finished)
- GERDA (finished)
- LVD
- MACRO (finished)
- OPERA
- XENON
- SABRE

== See also ==
- Astroparticle physics
- Fazia
