= Gerd Buschhorn =

German physicist (1934–2010)

Gerd W. Buschhorn (21 June 1934 – 20 January 2010) is the former director of the Max Planck Institute for Physics.
