= Pierre Binétruy =

French theoretical physicist

Pierre Binétruy (14 August 1955, Casablanca, French Morocco – 1 April 2017, Paris) was a French theoretical physicist, known for his research on cosmology, gravitational waves, strong nuclear interactions, and supersymmetry.

== Education and career ==
Pierre Binétruy studied in the 1970s at the École normale supérieure de Saint-Cloud (whose scientific departments were moved in 1987 to Lyon and were named the École normale supérieure de Lyon). Pierre Binétruy received his doctorate from CERN in 1980. His thesis, directed by Mary K. Gaillard, is entitled Theoretical and Phenomenological Aspects fo Gauge Theories. From 1980 to 1983 he held postdoctoral positions at CERN, the University of Florida, and the University of Chicago. From 1983 to 1986 he was a postdoc at the University of California, Berkeley, where he became interested in the astrophysics of the early universe for testing fundamental theories such as supersymmetry and superstrings. From 1986 to 1990 he was at the Laboratoire d'Annecy-le-Vieux de Physique des Particules (LAPP) in Annecy-le-Vieux. From 1990 to 2003 he was a professor at Paris-Sud University (Paris XI) in the Laboratory for Theoretical Physics (from 1999 as Professeur de classe exceptionelle). From 1997 to 2004 he was the director of the Groupement De Recherche (GDR) Supersymétrie. From 2003 until his death in 2017 he was a professor at Paris Diderot University (Paris 7). He was director of the AstroParticle and Cosmology (APC) Laboratory in Paris from its founding in 2005 to 2013. Under his directorship the APC Laboratory invested heavily in and developed the necessary technical resources for space-based projects of the Centre national d'études spatiales (CNES) and the European Space Agency (ESA).

Binétruy was co-director with George Smoot from 2010 to 2013 of the Paris Centre pour Cosmologie Physique (Paris Centre for Cosmological Physics, PCCP), which he founded with Smoot in 2010. At the beginning of his career Binétruy was more interested in the theory of supersymmetry and its possible testing in cosmology and gravitation, but his research interests later extended to cosmological inflation, dark energy, and the cosmology of gravitational waves. He told a reporter for Les Echos that because gravitational waves reach us intact from their place of emission, ce sont des messagers parfaits (they are perfect messengers). He aided the sciences of cosmology and astrophysics by serving on many committees. From 1995 to 2003 he was the president of the theory division of the Société Française de Physique.

He was involved in the Laser Interferometer Space Antenna (LISA) project, as well as the Planck space observatory project and the Euclid mission. He was one the most important French scientists advocating France's engagement in space-based searches for gravitational waves.

He developed with George Smoot the Massive Open Online Course (MOOC) entitled Gravité! du Big Bang aux trous noirs, (Gravity! from Big Bang to black holes), which is supported by the computing platform France université numérique (FUN) and the British computing platform Futurelearn. As of 2018, the online classes of the gravity MOOC had 98,000 registrants from 104 different countries.

He received in 1995 the Prix Thibaud and in 1999 the Prix Paul Langevin. In 1996 he was the Miller Professor in Berkeley, California. In 2015, he was named a membre senior of the Institut universitaire de France.

Binétruy died in 2017 at age 61 from cancer. A memorial conference in his honor was held on the 3rd and 4th of May 2018 at Paris Diderot University. In 2021 CNRS and the University of California, Berkeley opened the Pierre Binétruy Center on the Berkeley campus.

== Selected publications ==
=== Articles ===
- Binétruy, Pierre; Gaillard, Mary K. (1986). "Candidates for the inflaton field in superstring models". Physical Review D. 34 (10): 3069–3083. Bibcode:1986PhRvD..34.3069B. doi:10.1103/PhysRevD.34.3069. PMID 9957027.
- Binétruy, P.; Dvali, G. (1996). "D-term inflation". Physics Letters B. 388 (2): 241–246. arXiv:hep-ph/9606342. Bibcode:1996PhLB..388..241B. doi:10.1016/S0370-2693(96)01083-0. S2CID 18145499.
- Binétruy, P.; Dudas, E. (1996). "Gaugino condensation and the anomalous U(1)". Physics Letters B. 389 (3): 503–509. arXiv:hep-th/9607172. Bibcode:1996PhLB..389..503B. doi:10.1016/S0370-2693(96)01305-6. S2CID 14649971.
- Binétruy, P.; Girardi, G.; Grimm, R. (2001). "Supergravity couplings: A geometric formulation". Physics Reports. 343 (4–5): 255–462. arXiv:hep-th/0005225. Bibcode:2001PhR...343..255B. doi:10.1016/S0370-1573(00)00085-5. S2CID 119439794.
- Laurent, P.; Götz, D.; Binétruy, P.; Covino, S.; Fernandez-Soto, A. (2011). "Constraints on Lorentz Invariance Violation using integral/IBIS observations of GRB041219A". Physical Review D. 83 (12) 121301. arXiv:1106.1068. Bibcode:2011PhRvD..83l1301L. doi:10.1103/PhysRevD.83.121301. S2CID 53603505.
- Binétruy, P. (2013). "Dark energy and fundamental physics". The Astronomy and Astrophysics Review. 21 67. Bibcode:2013A&ARv..21...67B. doi:10.1007/s00159-013-0067-2. S2CID 253675522.
- Domcke, Valerie; Pieroni, Mauro; Binétruy, Pierre (2016). "Primordial gravitational waves for universality classes of pseudoscalar inflation". Journal of Cosmology and Astroparticle Physics. 2016 (6): 031. arXiv:1603.01287. Bibcode:2016JCAP...06..031D. doi:10.1088/1475-7516/2016/06/031. S2CID 119218560.

=== Books ===
- as editor with Paul Sorba and Raymond Stora: Conformal Field Theories and related Topics: Proceedings of the Third Annual Meeting on Theoretical Physics LAPP, Annecy-le-Vieux, France, 14–16 March 1988. Vol. 5. North Holland. 1988.
- as editor with Georges Girardi and Paul Sorba: Recent advances in field theory: proceedings of the Fourth Annecy Meeting on Theoretical Physics, Annecy-le-Vieux, France, 5–9 March 1990. North Holland. 1991. ISBN 978-1-4832-5732-7. description Binétruy, P.; Girardi, G.; Sorba, P. (3 June 2016). e-book. Elsevier. ISBN 978-1-4832-5732-7.
- as editor with Richard Schaeffer, Joseph Silk, and François David: The primordial Universe - L'universe primordial, Les Houches Session LXXI, 28 June – 23 July 1999. Springer. 2000. ISBN 978-3-540-41046-1.
- Supersymmetry: theory, experiment, and cosmology. Oxford University Press. 2006. Bibcode:2006stec.book.....B.
- À la poursuite des ondes gravitationnelles. Paris: Dunod. 2015. ISBN 978-2-10-072802-2.
  - Gravity!: The Quest for Gravitational Waves. Oxford University Press. 2018. ISBN 978-0-19-879651-0. (English translation of 2015 French original)
