= Paola Inverardi =

Italian computer scientist

Paola Inverardi (born 1957) is an Italian computer scientist specializing in software engineering. She is a professor in the Department of Information Engineering, Computer Science, and Mathematics at the University of L'Aquila in Italy, and the former rector of the university.

== Education and career ==
Inverardi was born in L'Aquila on 3 November 1957. She studied computer science at the University of Pisa, earning a laurea in 1981. After three years with Olivetti, she became a researcher for the Italian National Research Council (CNR) in 1984. She moved to her present position as a professor at the University of L'Aquila in 1994. She was founding director of the computer science department at the University of L'Aquila, and headed the department from 2001 to 2007, and from 2008 to 2012 served as dean of science at the university. From 2013 to 2019 she was rector of the University of L'Aquila.

== Recognition ==
In 2011, Mälardalen University College in Sweden gave Inverardi an honorary doctorate, and in 2017 the Shibaura Institute of Technology in Tokyo gave her another honorary doctorate. The IEEE Technical Committee on Software Engineering (TCSE) gave her their 2013 IEEE TCSE Distinguished Service Award.

Inverardi was elected to the Academia Europaea in 2012. She was named a 2021 ACM Fellow "for contributions to software architecture".
