= Louis Leprince-Ringuet =

French physicist, telecommunications engineer, essayist and historian of science

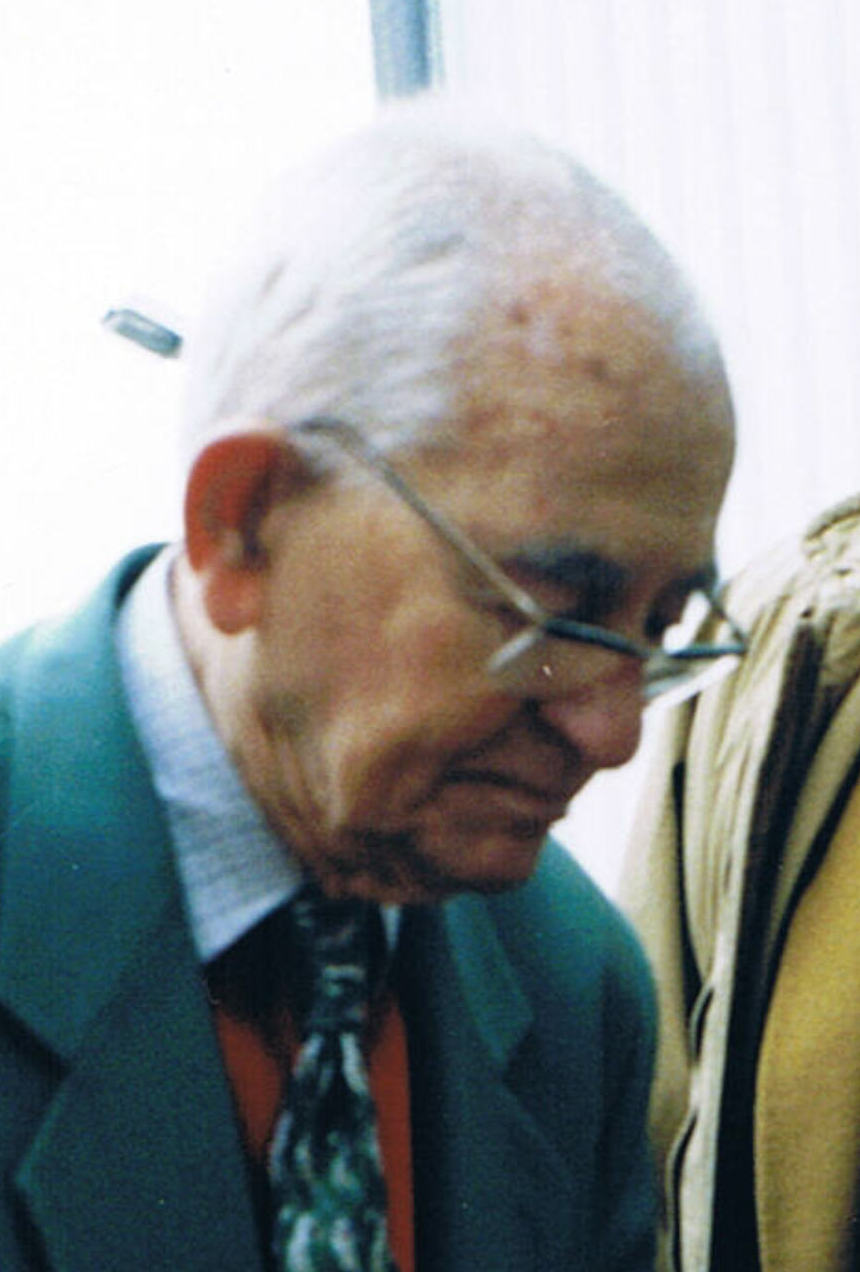
- Louis Leprince Ringuet (1997)
- Born: 27 March 1901; Alès, France
- Died: 23 December 2000 (aged 99); Paris, France
- Education: École Polytechnique
- Known for: Coining the hyperon Kaon discovery
- Awards: Legion of Honour (Grand officier)
- Scientific career
- Fields: Particle physics Cosmic rays
- Workplaces: French Academy of Sciences; Académie française CERN

Louis Leprince-Ringuet (27 March 1901, in Alès – 23 December 2000, in Paris) was a French physicist, telecommunications engineer, essayist and historian of science.

Leprince-Ringuet advocated strongly for the creation of the European Organization for Nuclear Research (CERN) and remained its indefatigable supporter. He was vice chair (1956–69) and chair (1964–66) of CERN’s scientific policy committee. He was elected to the American Philosophical Society.

He is known for early discovery of the kaon. He also coined the term hyperon in 1953.

== Honors ==
- Leprince-Ringuet laboratory from CNRS and École polytechnique, and part of the French National Institutes of Nuclear and Particle Physics (IN2P3), was named in his honour.
