= Astroparticle and Cosmology Laboratory =

Research unit in Paris, France

Coordinates: 48.8294°N 2.3819°E

AstroParticle and Cosmology laboratory
- AstroParticule et Cosmologie (APC)
- Type: Mixed Research Unit (UMR)
- Established: 2005
- Affiliations: Paris Cité University, CNRS, CEA, Paris Observatory
- Director: Jean-Christophe Hamilton
- Academic staff: 157
- Administrative staff: 14
- Doctoral students: 31
- Location: Paris, France
- Campus: Paris Rive Gauche (location)
- Website: apc.u-paris.fr

The Astroparticle and Cosmology (APC) laboratory in Paris gathers researchers (experimentalists, theorists and observers) working in different areas including high-energy astrophysics, cosmology, gravitation, and neutrino physics.

The institute was founded in January 2005 and soon moved to new Great Mills campus of Paris Cité University in the Paris Rive Gauche area.

The laboratory is a "Mixed Research Unit" in French terminology, funded by Paris Diderot University, the Centre national de la recherche scientifique (represented by three of its Institutes: mainly IN2P3, but also INSU and INP), the Commissariat à l'énergie atomique et aux énergies alternatives, and the Paris Observatory.

The first director of the laboratory was Pierre Binétruy (2005-2013). From January 2014 until December 2017 the director was Stavros Katsanevas, followed by Sotiris Loucatos, Antoine Kouchner, and currently Jean-Christophe Hamilton.

== Research activities ==
=== Cosmology ===
This group, headed by Cyrille Rosset, includes two main areas of research:

1. Experimental investigation of the cosmic microwave background, including attempts to detect CMB polarization B-modes, which could provide support for the theory of Inflation. Researchers were involved in the Planck space mission and are now active in the QUBIC experiment, the Simons Observatory, and the LiteBIRD satellite.
2. Cosmological analysis of large spectroscopic and imaging surveys for the determination of constraints on the nature of dark energy. Researchers are involved in the wide-field observatories aimed at understanding the nature of dark energy: the large field Baryon Oscillation Spectroscopic Survey telescope, the Vera C. Rubin Observatory and the Euclid space mission

=== High-energy astrophysics ===
Research carried out by this group, headed by Anne Lemière, aims at understanding the violent phenomena of the universe (mostly within compact stars, neutron stars, or black holes). The group is engaged in many international projects with telescopes or instruments detecting photons, cosmic rays, or neutrinos. For the observation of:

1. gamma rays, it is involved in the INTEGRAL observatory, the High Energy Stereoscopic System, the Cherenkov Telescope Array, and the Space Variable Objects Monitor
2. cosmic rays of ultra-high energy, it is involved in JEM-EUSO
3. neutrinos, it is involved in the ANTARES and KM3NeT projects collaborations
4. X-rays, it was involved in the space mission Hitomi

=== Neutrinos ===
The research carried out by this group, headed by Davide Franco, is dedicated to understanding neutrino properties is one of the laboratories' main activities. Researchers are involved in studies of the phenomenon of oscillation (Borexino, Double Chooz) and on future projects addressing the measurement of the neutrino mass hierarchy with atmospheric neutrinos with the deep-sea water Cherenkov telescope Orca and the long-baseline neutrino oscillation project Laguna-LBNO.

=== Gravitation ===
This core research of this group led by Stanislav Babak is the direct detection of gravitational waves. The group is involved in both ground-based (Virgo interferometer) and space-based (Laser Interferometer Space Antenna and its precursor LISA Pathfinder) instruments.

=== Theory ===
This group, headed by Dmitri Semikoz, covers the research topics of the laboratory from a theoretical perspective. It also carries out work on other areas of fundamental physics.

== Organization ==
The staff of the laboratory consists of 75 permanent researchers and over 60 engineers, technicians, and administrative personnel, plus about 125 non-permanent employees (PhD students, postdoctoral fellows, visitors). In addition, the Paris Center for Cosmological Physics directed by George Smoot is also part of the laboratory and one of the three functional centres of the Astroparticle Physics European Consortium is based here.

An "International Associated Laboratory" in astroparticle physics was launched in September 2007. It associates the APC laboratory with the Kavli Institute for Particle Astrophysics and Cosmology (Stanford University).

== Evaluation ==
The laboratory has been evaluated twice by the AERES: in 2008 and in 2013. In the latter evaluation, the lab won excellent scores (A or A+ in all criteria).

== Astroparticle Physics European Consortium ==
Astroparticle Physics European Consortium (APPEC) is a consortium of organizations from European countries that coordinate and fund research in astroparticle physics.
