= Astroparticle Physics (journal) =

- Discipline: Astroparticle physics
- Language: English
- Edited by: T. Huege

Publication details
- History: 1992–present
- Publisher: Elsevier
- Frequency: Monthly
- Impact factor: 4.2 (2023)

Standard abbreviations
- ISO 4: Astropart. Phys.

Indexing
- ISSN: 0927-6505
- OCLC no.: 137346847

Links
- Journal homepage

Astroparticle Physics is a peer-reviewed scientific journal covering experimental and theoretical research in the interacting fields of cosmic ray physics, astronomy and astrophysics, cosmology, and particle physics. It was established in 1992 and is published monthly by Elsevier. According to the Journal Citation Reports, the journal has a 2023 impact factor of 4.2.
