= Fazia =

FAZIA stands for the Four Pi A and Z Identification Array.

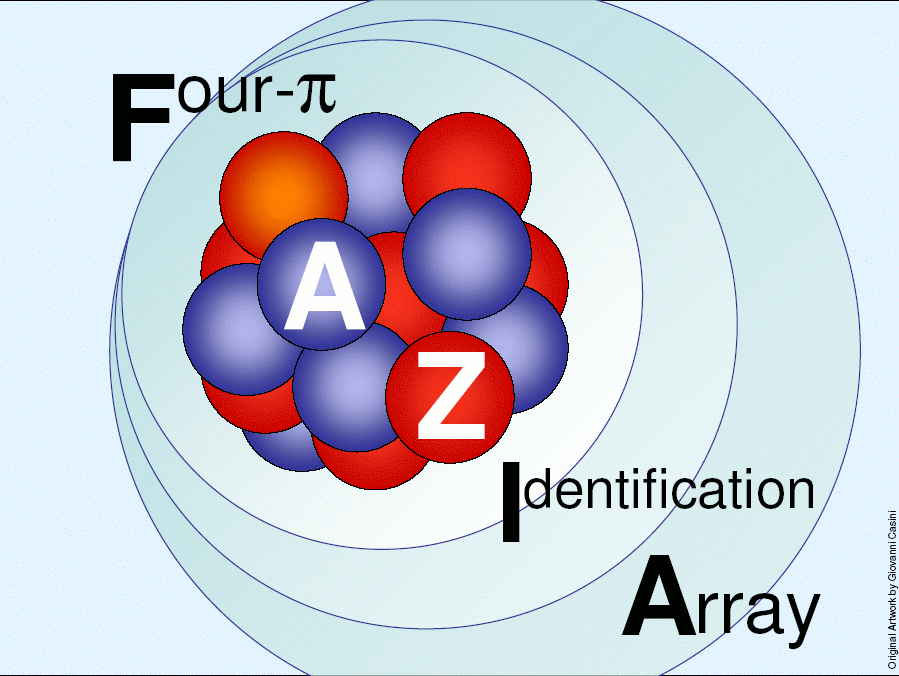
FAZIA logo

This is a project which aims at building a new 4pi particle detector for charged particles. It will operate in the domain of heavy-ion induced reactions around the Fermi energy. It groups together more than 10 institutions worldwide in Nuclear Physics. It is planned to work in 2013-2014, coincidentally to the advent of new high intensity particle accelerators for radioactive nuclear beams. A large effort on research and development is currently made, especially on digital electronics and pulse shape analysis, in order to improve the detection capabilities of such particle detectors in different domains, such as charge and mass identification, lower energy thresholds, as well as improved energetic and angular resolutions.
