= Institut national de physique nucléaire et de physique des particules =

Coordinating body for nuclear and particle physics in France

National Institute of Nuclear and Particle Physics
- Institut national de physique nucléaire et de physique des particules
- Abbreviation: IN2P3
- Formation: 1971; 55 years ago
- Director: Reynald Pain
- Parent organization: CNRS
- Website: www.in2p3.fr/index.htm

The French National Institute of Nuclear and Particle Physics (French: Institut national de physique nucléaire et de physique des particules, IN2P3), also known as CNRS Nucléaire & Particules, is the coordinating body for nuclear and particle physics in France. It was established in 1971 as a division of the French National Centre for Scientific Research (CNRS). Its purpose is "to promote and unite research activities in the various fields of physics".

== List of IN2P3 institutes ==
=== Strasbourg ===
- The Hubert Curien Multi-disciplinary Institute (l'Institut Pluridisciplinaire Hubert Curien, IPHC)

=== Annecy ===
- The Annecy Particle Physics Laboratory (le Laboratoire d'Annecy de physique des particules, LAPP) at the Université Savoie Mont Blanc

=== Lyon ===
- The Institute of Nuclear Physics of Lyon (l'Institut de physique nucléaire de Lyon, IPNL) at Claude Bernard University Lyon 1
- The IN2P3 Computing Centre (le Centre de calcul, CC-IN2P3)
- The Advanced Materials Laboratory (le Laboratoire des matériaux avancés, LMA)

=== Modane ===
- The Modane Underground Laboratory (le Laboratoire souterrain de Modane, LSM)

=== Grenoble ===
- The Laboratory of Subatomic Physics and Cosmology (le Laboratoire de physique subatomique et de cosmologie de Grenoble, LPSC) at the Université Grenoble Alpes

=== Marseille ===
- The Centre for Particle Physics of Marseille (le Centre de physique des particules de Marseille, CPPM) at Aix-Marseille University

=== Montpellier ===
- (le Laboratoire Univers et Particules de Montpellier, LUPM) at the University of Montpellier

=== Clermont-Ferrand ===
- The Clermont Physics Laboratory (le Laboratoire de physique de Clermont, LPC Clermont) at the University of Clermont Auvergne

=== Bordeaux ===
- Centre of Nuclear Studies of Bordeaux-Gradignan (le Centre d'études nucléaires de Bordeaux Gradignan, CENBG) at the University of Bordeaux

=== Nantes ===
- The Laboratory of Subatomic Physics and Associated Technologies (le Laboratoire de physique subatomique et des technologies associées, SUBATECH) at the University of Nantes

=== Caen ===
- The National Large Heavy Ion Accelerator (le Grand accélérateur national d'ions lourds, GANIL)
- The Caen Particle Physics Laboratory (le Laboratoire de physique corpusculaire, LPC Caen) at ENSICAEN, associated with Normandy University and University of Caen Normandy.

==== Toulouse ====
- The Institute of Physics of the two Infinities Toulouse (The Institute of Physics of the two Infinities Toulouse, L2IT) at Université Toulouse III

=== Paris ===
- The Astroparticle and Cosmology Laboratory (le laboratoire AstroParticule et Cosmologie, APC) at Paris Diderot University
- The Laboratory of Nuclear and High-Energy Physics (le Laboratoire de physique nucléaire et des hautes énergies, LPNHE) at Pierre and Marie Curie University and Paris Diderot University
- (le Musée Curie et les archives de l'Institut du radium)

==== Orsay ====
- The Institute of Physics of the two Infinities Irène Joliot-Curie (Institut de physique des deux infinis Irène Joliot-Curie, IJCLab) at the Paris-Saclay University

==== Palaiseau ====
- The Laboratoire Leprince-Ringuet Laboratory (le Laboratoire Leprince-Ringuet, LLR) at École Polytechnique
