= OPERA experiment =

Italian neutrino detector (2011–2012)

Coordinates: 42.46°N 13.57°E

The Oscillation Project with Emulsion-tRacking Apparatus (OPERA) was an instrument used in a scientific experiment for detecting tau neutrinos from muon neutrino oscillations. The experiment is a collaboration between CERN in Geneva, Switzerland, and the Laboratori Nazionali del Gran Sasso (LNGS) in Gran Sasso, Italy and uses the CERN Neutrinos to Gran Sasso (CNGS) neutrino beam.

The process started with protons from the Super Proton Synchrotron (SPS) at CERN being fired in pulses at a carbon target to produce pions and kaons. These particles decay to produce muons and neutrinos.

The beam from CERN was stopped on 3 December 2012, ending data taking, but the analysis of the collected data has continued.

== Detector ==
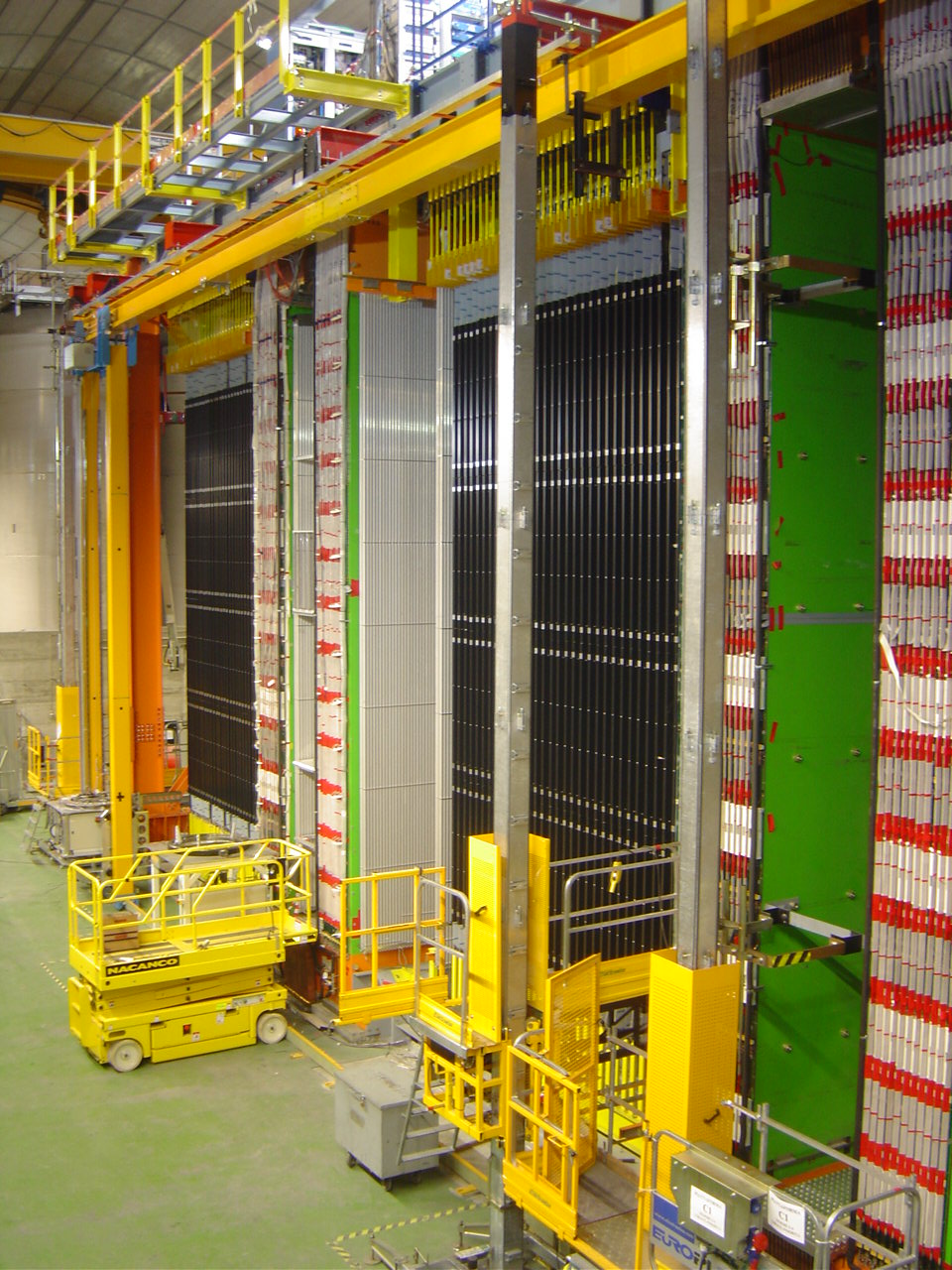
View of the OPERA detector at the CNGS facility

OPERA, in Hall C of the Gran Sasso underground labs, was built in 2003–2008. The taus resulting from the interaction of tau neutrinos are observed in "bricks" of photographic films (nuclear emulsion) interleaved with lead sheets. Each brick weighs 8.3 kg; the two OPERA supermodules contain 150,000 bricks arranged into parallel walls interleaved with plastic scintillator counters. Each supermodule is followed by a magnetic spectrometer for momentum and charge identification of penetrating particles. During data collection, a neutrino interaction and its corresponding brick are tagged in real time by the scintillators and spectrometers. These bricks are extracted from the walls asynchronously with respect to the beam for film development, scanning and for the topological and kinematic search of tau decays.

== Tau neutrinos ==
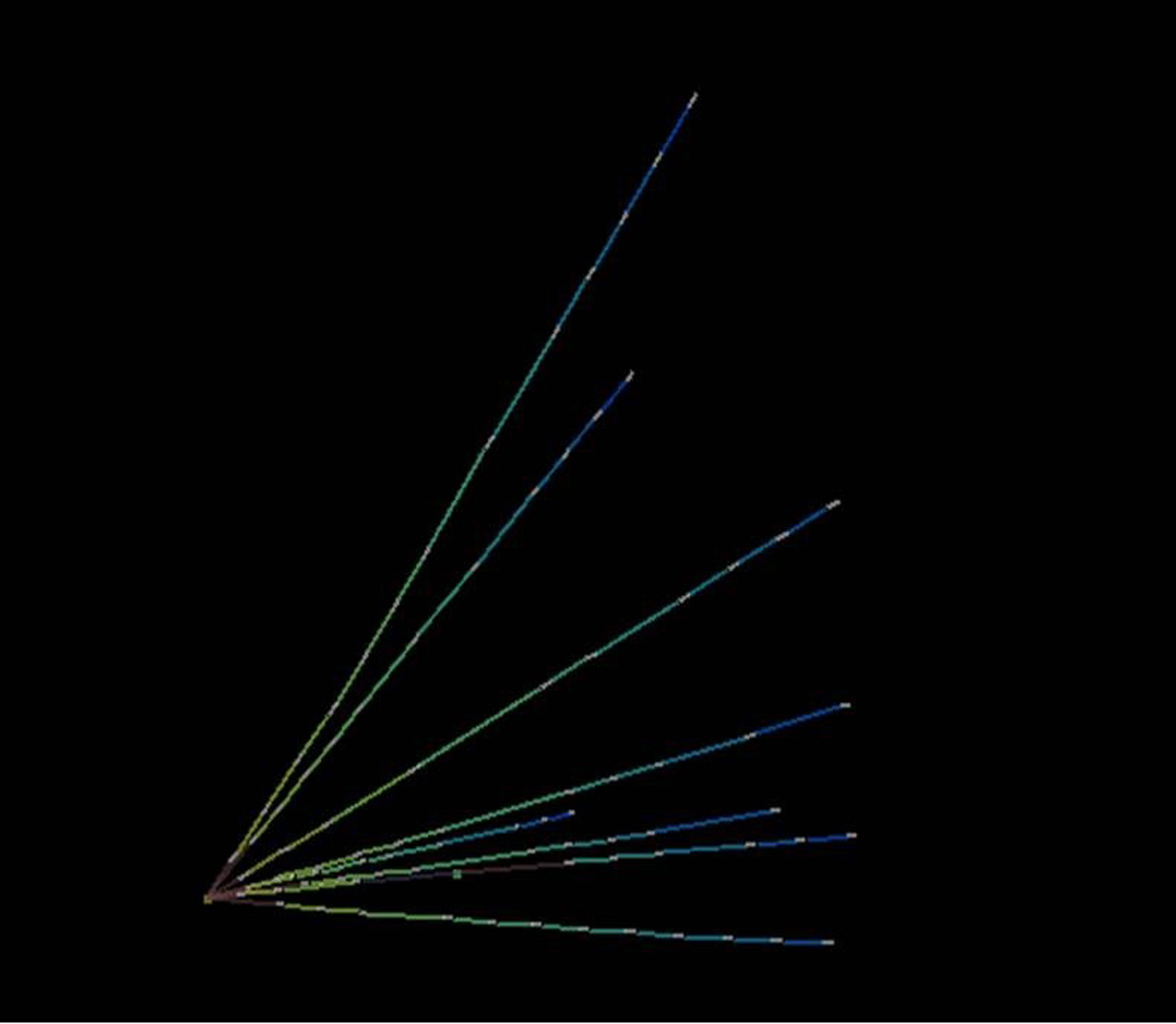
First neutrino events seen by the core of the OPERA experiment

In total, five tau neutrinos were detected. On 31 May 2010, OPERA researchers observed the first tau neutrino candidate event in a muon neutrino beam. On 6 June 2012, OPERA announced the observation of a second tau neutrino event. On 26 March 2013, the experiment caught for the third time a muon neutrino oscillating into a tau neutrino during travel from CERN to LNGS. The fourth one was found in 2014, and the fifth was seen in 2015.

== Time-of-flight measurements ==
In September 2011, OPERA researchers observed muon neutrinos apparently traveling faster than the speed of light. In February and March 2012, OPERA researchers blamed this result on a loose fibre optic cable connecting a GPS receiver to an electronic card in a computer. On 16 March 2012, a report announced that an independent experiment in the same laboratory, also using the CNGS neutrino beam, but this time the ICARUS detector found no discernible difference between the speed of a neutrino and the speed of light. In May 2012, the Gran Sasso experiments BOREXINO, ICARUS, LVD and OPERA all measured neutrino velocity with a short-pulsed beam, and obtained agreement with the speed of light, showing that the original OPERA result was mistaken. Finally in July 2012, the OPERA collaboration updated their results. After the instrumental effects mentioned above were taken into account, it was shown that the speed of neutrinos is consistent with the speed of light. This was confirmed by a new, improved set of measurements in May 2013.
