= Astroparticle physics =

Branch of particle physics

Astroparticle physics, also called particle astrophysics, is a branch of particle physics that studies elementary particles of astrophysical origin and their relation to astrophysics and cosmology. It is a relatively new field of research emerging at the intersection of particle physics, astronomy, astrophysics, detector physics, relativity, solid state physics, and cosmology. Partly motivated by the discovery of neutrino oscillation, the field has undergone rapid development, both theoretically and experimentally, since the early 2000s.

== History ==
The field of astroparticle physics evolved out of optical astronomy. With the growth of detector technology came the more mature astrophysics, which involved multiple physics subtopics, such as mechanics, electrodynamics, thermodynamics, plasma physics, nuclear physics, relativity, and particle physics. Particle physicists found astrophysics necessary due to difficulty in producing particles with comparable energy to those found in space. For example, the cosmic ray spectrum contains particles with energies as high as 10^{20} eV, where a proton–proton collision at the Large Hadron Collider occurs at an energy of ~10^{12} eV.

The field can be said to have begun in 1910, when a German physicist named Theodor Wulf measured the ionization in the air, an indicator of gamma radiation, at the bottom and top of the Eiffel Tower. He found that there was far more ionization at the top than what was expected if only terrestrial sources were attributed for this radiation.

The Austrian physicist Victor Francis Hess hypothesized that some of the ionization was caused by radiation from the sky. To defend this hypothesis, Hess designed instruments capable of operating at high altitudes and performed observations on ionization up to an altitude of 5.3 km. From 1911 to 1913, Hess made ten flights to meticulously measure ionization levels. Through prior calculations, he did not expect there to be any ionization above an altitude of 500 m if terrestrial sources were the sole cause of radiation. His measurements however, revealed that although the ionization levels initially decreased with altitude, they began to sharply rise at some point. At the peaks of his flights, he found that the ionization levels were much greater than at the surface. Hess was then able to conclude that "a radiation of very high penetrating power enters our atmosphere from above". Furthermore, one of Hess's flights was during a near-total eclipse of the Sun. Since he did not observe a dip in ionization levels, Hess reasoned that the source had to be further away in space. For this discovery, Hess was one of the people awarded the Nobel Prize in Physics in 1936. In 1925, Robert Millikan confirmed Hess's findings and subsequently coined the term 'cosmic rays'.

Many physicists knowledgeable about the origins of the field of astroparticle physics prefer to attribute this 'discovery' of cosmic rays by Hess as the starting point for the field.

== Topics of research ==
While it may be difficult to decide on a standard 'textbook' description of the field of astroparticle physics, the field can be characterized by the topics of research that are actively being pursued. The journal Astroparticle Physics accepts papers that are focused on new developments in the following areas:

- High-energy cosmic-ray physics and astrophysics;
- Particle cosmology;
- Particle astrophysics;
- Related astrophysics: supernova, active galactic nuclei, cosmic abundances, dark matter etc.;
- High-energy, VHE and UHE gamma-ray astronomy;
- High- and low-energy neutrino astronomy;
- Instrumentation and detector developments related to the above-mentioned fields.

=== Open questions ===
One main task for the future of the field is simply to thoroughly define itself beyond working definitions and clearly differentiate itself from astrophysics and other related topics.

Current unsolved problems for the field of astroparticle physics include characterization of dark matter and dark energy. Observations of the orbital velocities of stars in the Milky Way and other galaxies starting with Walter Baade and Fritz Zwicky in the 1930s, along with observed velocities of galaxies in galactic clusters, found motion at the outskirts far exceeding the velocity of the visible matter needed to account for their gravitational dynamics. Since the early nineties some candidates have been found to partially explain some of the undetectable matter, but they are nowhere near sufficient to offer a full explanation. The finding of an accelerating universe suggests that as well as 'dark matter', an additional component, nicknamed 'dark energy' plays a significant part in our dynamical vacuum.

Another question for astroparticle physicists is why is there so much more matter than antimatter in the universe today. Baryogenesis is the term for the hypothetical processes that produced the unequal numbers of baryons and antibaryons in the early universe, which is why the universe is made of matter today, and not antimatter.

== Experimental facilities ==
The rapid development of this field has led to the design of new types of infrastructure. In underground laboratories or with specially designed telescopes, antennas and satellite experiments, astroparticle physicists employ new detection methods to observe a wide range of cosmic particles including neutrinos, gamma rays and cosmic rays at the highest energies. They are also searching for dark matter and gravitational waves. Experimental particle physicists are limited by the technology of their terrestrial accelerators, which are only able to produce a small fraction of the energies found in nature.

The following is an incomplete list of laboratories and experiments in astroparticle physics.

=== Underground laboratories ===
These facilities are located deep underground, to shield very sensitive experiments from cosmic rays that would otherwise preclude the observation of very rare phenomena.

- China Jinping Underground Laboratory is a deep underground laboratory in the Jinping Mountains of Sichuan, China.
- Kamioka Observatory is a neutrino and gravitational waves laboratory located underground in the Mozumi Mine near the Kamioka section of the city of Hida in Gifu Prefecture, Japan. It is the site of the Super-Kamiokande experiment.
- Laboratori Nazionali del Gran Sasso (LNGS) is a laboratory that hosts experiments requiring a low-background environment. Its experimental halls are located within the Gran Sasso mountain, near L'Aquila (Italy).
- SNOLAB is located 2 km underground in an active mine, in Greater Sudbury (Canada). Expanded from the original Sudbury Neutrino Observatory, the entire underground laboratory is operated as a cleanroom, hosting experiments in neutrino physics and dark matter searches.
- Sanford Underground Research Facility (SURF) located in Lead, South Dakota hosts multiple experiments and is funded in part by the United States Department of Energy.

=== Neutrino detectors ===
Very large neutrino detectors are required to record the extremely rare interactions of neutrinos with atomic matter.

- IceCube (Antarctica). The largest particle detector in the world, was completed in December 2010. The purpose of the detector is to investigate high energy neutrinos, search for dark matter, observe supernovae explosions, and search for exotic particles such as magnetic monopoles.
- ANTARES (Toulon, France). A Neutrino detector 2.5 km under the Mediterranean Sea off the coast of Toulon, France. Designed to locate and observe neutrino flux in the direction of the southern hemisphere.
- NESTOR Project (Pylos, Greece). The target of the international collaboration is the deployment of a neutrino telescope on the sea floor off of Pylos, Greece.
- BOREXINO, a real-time detector, installed at LNGS, designed to detect neutrinos from the Sun with an organic liquid scintillator target.

=== Dark matter detectors ===
Experiments are dedicated to the direct detection of dark matter interactions with the detector target material.

- LZ experiment is a dark matter direct detection experiment hoping to observe weakly interacting massive particles (WIMPs) scatters on xenon nuclei. The experiment is located at the Sanford Underground Research Facility (SURF) in South Dakota, and is managed by the United States Department of Energy's Lawrence Berkeley National Lab.
- XENONnT, the upgrade of XENON1T, is a dark matter direct search experiment located at LNGS and is expected to be sensitive to WIMPs with spin-independent cross section of 10^{−48} cm^{2}.
- The Global Argon Dark Matter Collaboration operates a series of liquid argon experiments: DarkSide-50 at LNGS, DEAP-3600 at SNOLAB, and the upcoming DarkSide-20k detector at LNGS. These experiments look for WIMPs and heavier dark matter particle candidates.
- The Cryogenic Dark Matter Search (CDMS) is a series of experiments searching for WIMPs interactions with semiconductor detectors at millikelvin temperatures.
- The CERN Axion Solar Telescope (CERN, Switzerland) searches for axions originating from the Sun.

=== Cosmic ray observatories ===
Interested in high-energy cosmic ray detection are:

- Pierre Auger Observatory (Malargüe, Argentina) detects and investigates high energy cosmic rays using two techniques. One is to study the particles interactions with water placed in surface detector tanks. The other technique is to track the development of air showers through observation of ultraviolet light emitted high in the Earth's atmosphere.
- Telescope Array Project (Delta, Utah), an experiment for the detection of ultra high energy cosmic rays (UHECRs) using a ground array and fluorescence techniques in the desert of west Utah.

== See also ==
- Astroparticle Physics (journal)
- Neutrino astronomy
- Urca process
- Unsolved problems in physics
