= Jurado =

Jurado is a surname. Notable people with the surname include:

- Alberto Jurado (1902–1984), Ecuadorian athlete
- Alicia Jurado (1922-2011), Argentine writer and academic
- Álvaro Jurado (born 1981), Spanish football (soccer) player
- Antonio Torres Jurado (1817–1892), Spanish guitar maker
- Ariel Jurado (born 1996), Panamanian professional baseball pitcher
- Bárbara Jurado Antúnez (1842–1872), Catholic mystic writer
- Beatriz Jurado (born 1983), Spanish politician
- Béatriz Jurado-Apruzzese, Spanish physicist
- Carlos Jurado (1947–2023), Uruguayan football (soccer) player and manager
- Christofer Jurado (born 1995), Panamanian cyclist
- Cristina Jurado (born 1972), Spanish writer and editor
- Crystal Jurado, American make-up artist
- Damien Jurado, singer-songwriter
- Elena Jurado (1901-1974) Filipino-American actress
- Enrique Jurado (1911–1944), Filipino military officer
- Enrique Jurado Barrio (1882–1965), Spanish military officer
- Enrique M. Jurado (born 1976), Peruvian jockey
- Ezequiel Jurado (born 1973), Argentine rugby union player
- Fernando Jurado Noboa (born 1949), psychiatrist
- Jalma Jurado (1937–2022), Brazilian plastic surgeon
- Jeanette Jurado (born 1965), American singer
- Jorge Jurado (born 1995), Spanish actor
- José Jurado de la Parra (1856–1943), Spanish journalist
- José Jurado (1899–1971), Argentine golfer
- José Manuel Jurado (born 1986), football (soccer) player
- Juan Gómez-Jurado (born 1977), journalist and author
- Juan de Dios Jurado (born 1981), runner
- Katy Jurado (1924–2002), actress
- Ricardo Jurado (born 1972), Spanish equestrian
- Rocío Jurado (1946–2006), Spanish singer and actress
- Rubén Jurado (born 1986), Spanish football (soccer) player
- Severo Jurado (born 1988), Spanish equestrian
- Ysabel Jurado (born 1990), American lawyer and politician

== See also ==
- Cortijo Jurado, mansion
- Juradó, town in Colombia
