= Bárbara de Santo Domingo =

19th-century Spanish Catholic mystic

Servant of God Bárbara de Santo Domingo OP
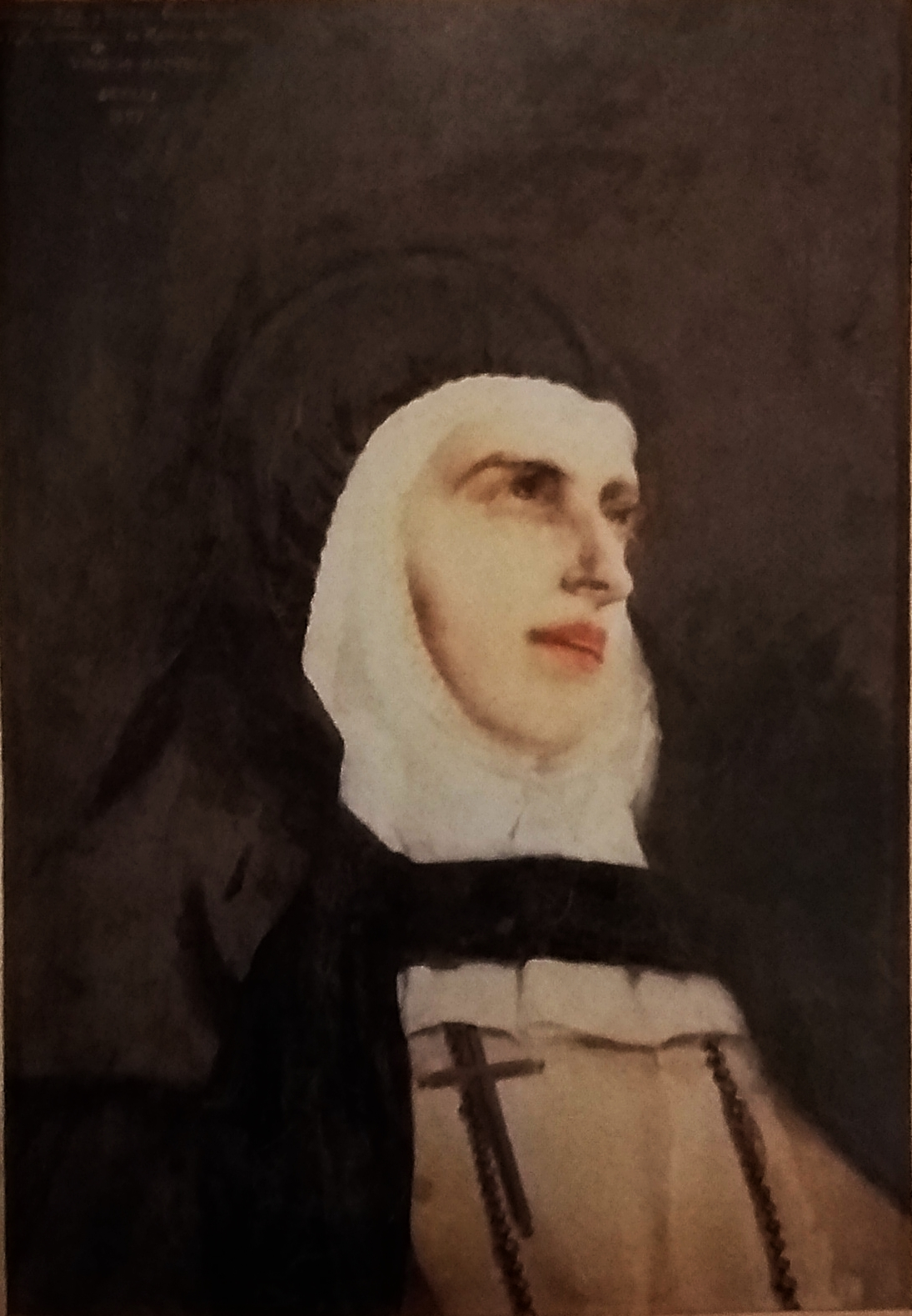
- Portrait painting of Bárbara de Santo Domingo by Virgilio Mattoni.
- Born: Bárbara Jurado Antúnez; 18 November 1842; Seville, Spain
- Died: 18 November 1872 (aged 30); Seville, Spain
- Resting place: Convento de Madre de Dios, Seville

Bárbara de Santo Domingo O.P. (Seville, 7 February 1842 - Seville, 18 November 1872) was a 19th-century Spanish Catholic mystic who belonged to the Dominican Order.

== Early life and education ==
She was born inside the Giralda, the bell tower of Seville Cathedral, as her father was a bell-ringer who occupied a room in the aforementioned tower. For this reason, she was known as the Hija de la Giralda (Daughter of the Giralda). Her father, Casimiro, was from Seville, and her mother, María Josefa, was from Guadalcanal. Bárbara was baptized on 9 February 1842, in Seville Cathedral.

On 6 June 1853, her older brother, José, who was 13 years old, died accidentally when he fell from the tower while the bells were ringing during the octava of San Fernando celebration.

In her adolescence, she received Gregorian singing and organ playing classes.

== Career ==
In July 1859, at the age of 17, she entered the Convento de Madre de Dios, Seville, run by Dominican nuns, located on Calle San José in Seville. After six months as a postulant, she began the novitiate on 15 January 1860. She was professed as a nun on 3 February 1861. In the convent, she continued playing the organ. Between 1861 and 1866, she suffered a large number of illnesses, most of them unknown at the time.

As a nun at the Convent of Madre de Dios, she met the priest José Torres Padilla, felt understood by him, and chose him as her confessor and spiritual director. Torres Padilla also related to other nuns with a reputation for holiness, such as the barefoot Mercedarian known as Maria Micaela Desmaisieres, the Cistercian Ángela de Jesús and Saint Angela of the Cross, founder of the Sisters of the Company of the Cross.

Sister Bárbara underwent physical mortification with cilices and other elements. She also practiced prolonged fasting.

Due to the Revolution of 1868, on October 13 of that year, the convent was exclaustrated and the Dominicans were taken to the Monastery of San Clemente, run by Cistercian nuns. In this convent, the two communities, Cistercians and Dominicans, each led their own religious life, each one assuming their own expenses and helping in those common ones. Here, Sister Bárbara lived with the Cistercian Ángela de Jesús, with whom she felt very understood.

From 1871, Sister Bárbara began to have religious visions. She wrote about her visions of the Sacred Heart of Jesus, the Mary, mother of Jesus, and the Christ Child . She also had other types of experiences that she considered supernatural. For example, on 4 December 1871, she wrote that on the days when she only ate bread, she had experienced on three occasions that the bread tasted sweet when it did not contain any sugar. On December 29, 1871, she wrote about her mystical betrothal. She also wrote about visions of demons and hell.

== Death, burial, and legacy ==
Sister Bárbara died on 18 November 1872. Her body remained incorrupt for eight days. A photograph was taken of the corpse on the fourth day of her death, which years later was used by Virgilio Mattoni to paint a portrait. One of the people who watched over the corpse of Sister Bárbara was Saint Angela de la Cruz. Sister Bárbara was buried in the Monastery of San Clemente.

On 11 February 1876, the Convent of Madre de Dios was returned to the Dominicans who, after some restoration work, moved there on 1 August 1877. On 16 November 1877, the remains of Sister Bárbara were transferred to the church of the Convent of Madre de Dios. On 21 November of that year, she was buried in a choir altar.

Between February 1873 and 1874, the Guatemalan theologian José Antonio Ortiz Urruela wrote the first biography of this nun, entitled Vida de la sierva de Dios sor Bárbara de Santo Domingo (Life of the Servant of God Sor Barbara de Santo Domingo), which was published posthumously in Seville in 1888 by Canon Francisco Mateos Gago.

== Beatification process ==
The Archbishop of Seville Zeferino González y Díaz Tuñón, a Dominican cardinal, opened the beatification process for Sister Bárbara on 18 January 1889. The archbishop's resignation due to illness that same year brought the process to a halt. In the year 1900, Archbishop Marcelo Spínola y Maestre reactivated the process, but it was archived. On 19 April 1920, Archbishop Cardinal Enrique Almaraz y Santos resumed the process, but it was closed again without results. On 17 April 2001, Archbishop Carlos Amigo Vallejo reopened a beatification process without results. On none of these occasions did the case reach the Vatican.
