= Province of Tierra Firme =

Spanish province in the Americas (1498–1542)

Province of Tierra Firme Provincia de Tierra Firme
- 1498–1542
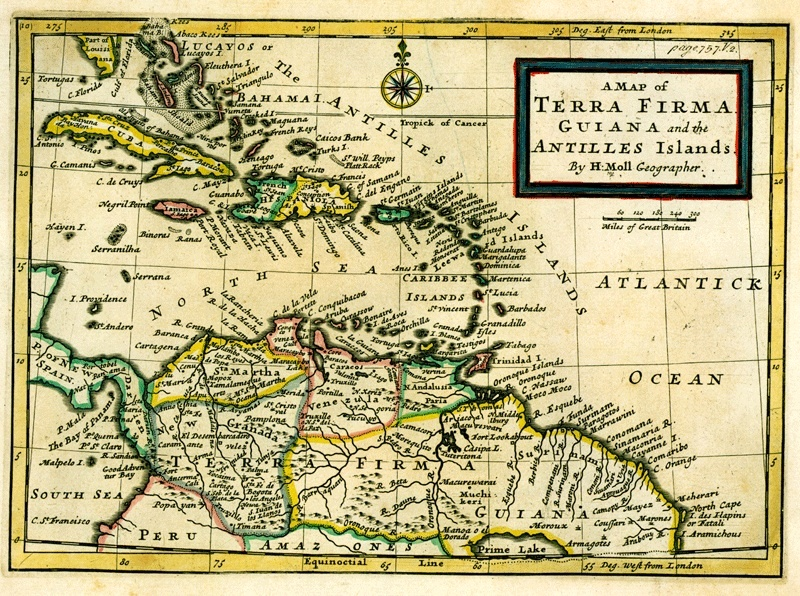
- Spanish map of the Tierra Firme
- Status: Province of the Crown of Castile
- Capital: Santa María la Antigua del Darién; Panama City
- Common languages: Spanish
- Religion: Catholicism
- Government: Monarchy
- King
  - 1492-1516: Ferdinand II and Isabella I
  - 1516–1556: Charles I
- Historical era: Spanish Empire
  - Established: 1498
  - Creation of the Viceroyalty of Peru: 1542
- Currency: Peso
Preceded by
Kalinago
Emberá people
Guna people
Wayuu people
Zenú
Ngäbe people
Kingdom of Parita
Succeeded by
Viceroyalty of Peru
Captaincy General of Venezuela
New Kingdom of Granada

During Spain's New World Empire, its mainland coastal possessions surrounding the Caribbean Sea and the Gulf of Mexico were referred to collectively as the Spanish Main. The southern portion of these coastal possessions – the northern portion of South America, the Pacific Coast of Colombia and Mexico, and Central America – were known as the Province of Tierra Firme (Spanish: Provincia de Tierra Firme), or the "Mainland Province" (as contrasted with Spain's nearby insular colonies). The Province of Tierra Firme, or simply Tierra Firme, was also called Costa Firme.

== History ==
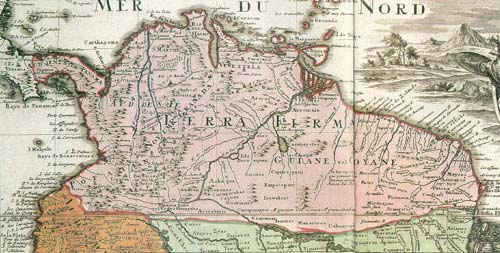
Old map of Tierra Firme, showing the initial divisions of the region

In 1498, Cristopher Columbus entered the Gulf of Paria in Venezuela and explored the Orinoco River. In his fourth and last voyage, he also explored the Honduras. In 1509, authority was granted to Alonso de Ojeda and Diego de Nicuesa to colonize the territories between the west side of the Gulf of Urabá and Cabo de la Vela, and Urabá westward to Cabo Gracias a Dios in present-day Honduras. The westernmost portion was given the name Tierra Firme comprising many formerly Indigenous territories, including the former Kingdom of Parita. Other provinces of this region during this era were Nueva Andalucia and Veragua or Castilla del Oro; the main city in Tierra Firme was Santa Maria La Antigua del Darién, now Darién, Panama, near the mouth of the Tarena river. The idea was to create a unitary administrative organization similar to Nueva España (now Mexico), near the Captaincy General of Guatemala.

Tierra Firme later received control over other territories: the Isla de Santiago (now Jamaica) the Cayman Islands; Roncador, Quitasueño, and Providencia and other islands now under Colombian control; and the territories of present-day Costa Rica and Nicaragua as far as Cabo Gracias a Dios. The eastern frontier of Tierra Firme also included the east side of the Gulf of Darién or Urabá, the east side of the Atrato and Truando rivers, ending in Cabo Marzo on the Pacific side. Between these limits lie Santa Maria La Antigua Del Darien on the Gulf of Urabá and Jurado on the Pacific side.

When the Central American states gained independence, the precise frontiers were unclear. For example, some ancient maps and historical references suggest that the entire Caribbean coast as far as Cabo Gracias a Dios was part Tierra Firme or Castilla Del Oro. On the other hand, this would embrace populated regions of the Mosquito Coast that were never under the effective rule of Tierra Firme. Disputes over both of Panama's frontiers were finally solved by agreements with Costa Rica and Colombia, respectively.

== Governorates in Hispanic America ==
The administrative division and the adelantado grants of Charles V prior to the establishment of the Viceroyalty of Peru, including the Tierra Firme.

After the territorial division of South America between Spain and Portugal, the Peruvian Hispanic administration was divided into six entities:

- Province of Tierra Firme, included the Caribbean Coast, Central America, the Pacific Coast of Colombia and Mexico.
- Governorate of New Castile, consisting of the territories from roughly the Ecuadorian-Colombian border in the north to Cuzco in the south.
- Governorate of New Toledo, forming the previous southern half of the Inca empire, stretching towards central Chile.
- Governorate of New Andalusia, which was not formally conquered by Spain until decades later.
- Governorate of New León, the southernmost part of the continent until the Strait of Magellan.
- Governorate of Terra Australis, territories from the south of the Strait of Magellan to the South Pole.

This territorial division set the basis for the Hispanic administration of South America for several decades. It was formally dissolved in 1544, when King Charles I sent his personal envoy, Blasco Núñez Vela, to govern the newly founded Viceroyalty of Peru that replaced the governorates.

== See also ==
- Pedro Arias Dávila

== General and cited references ==
- Alba C., M. M., Geografía Descriptiva de la Republica de Panama ("Descriptive Geography of the Republic of Panama") (in Spanish). Sixth Edition, text approved by Ministry of Education. Panama: Imprenta Nacional. 1962.
- Castillero R., Ernesto J. Historia de Panama ("History of Panama") (in Spanish), Ninth Edition. Editorial Renovación. 1968.
- Noris Correa de Sanjur, Historia de Panama ("History of Panama") (in Spanish), a school text approved by Ministry of Education. Editorial A.I.P.S.A. 1984.
- el Portal de la Música Típica, section: - "Recordando La Guerra de Coto en el Centenario de Panama" (in Spanish) Portal for "typical" music (characteristic of Panama): "Remembering the Coto War on the Centenary of Panama".
- Lucien N. B. Wise, Le Canal De Panama, L'Isthme Americain explorations : Comparaison des Traces Etudies, Négociations; Etats des Travaux, Libraire Hachette Et C, Paris, 1886; (in French) (Tr. Spanish: "El Canal De Panama, Itsmo Americano. Exploraciones; Comparaciones de los trazados Estudiados; negociaciones; estados de los trabajos, Published by Loteria Review N°4, Imprenta "la Academia", Panama, 1956.
