= Robert Klapisch =

French physicist (1932–2020)

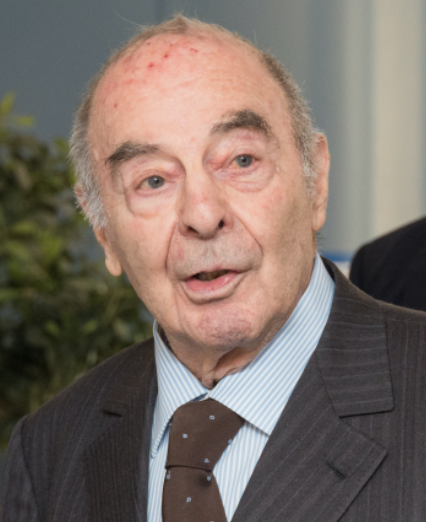
- Born: 26 December 1932; Cachan, France
- Died: 21 March 2020 (aged 87); Paris, France
- Education: ESPCI Paris, Paris-Sud University
- Spouse(s): Françoise Meyer, Christiane Klapisch-Zuber, Louise Klapisch
- Scientific career
- Fields: Nuclear physics
- Workplaces: CNRS, CERN
- Doctoral advisor: René Bernas

Robert Elie Klapisch (26 December 1932 – 21 March 2020) was a French engineer and physicist.

== Biography ==
Klapisch completed his secondary studies at Lycée Lakanal in Sceaux, before attending Lycée Louis-le-Grand in Paris and Collège Lavoisier. He obtained an engineering degree from ESPCI Paris in 1952, and a doctorate at Paris-Sud University in 1966.

Klapisch began working at the French National Centre for Scientific Research (CNRS) in 1956, after his graduation from ESPCI. He interrupted his research between 1960 and 1962 to perform his military service in the Algerian War. Between 1968 and 1969 Klapisch had a sabbatical leave, which he spent at Princeton University. He also conducted research at the Curie Institute in Paris, employed alongside Jean Teillac and René Bernas. Klapisch was one of the original members of the Institut national de physique nucléaire et de physique des particules (IPN), founded in 1956. After Bernas' premature death at age 50, in 1971, Klapisch directed the laboratories at IPN.

Klapisch held the position as director of research at the European Council for Nuclear Research (CERN) from 1981 to 1986. In this role he supervised the research program for the Super Proton–Antiproton Synchrotron, which resulted in the award of the Nobel Prize in Physics in 1984 to Carlo Rubbia and Simon van der Meer "for their decisive contributions to the large project, which led to the discovery of the field particles W and Z, communicators of weak interaction." As a strong supporter of the Low Energy Antiproton Ring, Klapisch went on to be one of the pioneers of the antiproton programme. He also played an instrumental role in the development of the heavy-ion research program at CERN, which opened the possibilities to study quark–gluon plasma. From 1994 to 2000, Klapisch was involved in a group, led by Rubbia, devoted to an innovative approach to nuclear energy.

In 2002, President Jacques Chirac and Prime Minister Roselyne Bachelot assigned Yves Coppens with creating the French Charter for the Environment. Klapisch accepted Coppens' invitation to join the scientific committee. Klapisch served on a number of scientific committees in Europe, the United States, and Canada. In 1982, Jean-Pierre Chevènement asked him to write a report on the future of nuclear science in France. This report earned him a spot in the Ordre des Palmes académiques.

In 2002, Klapisch organized a series of lectures, called Partage du Savoir en Méditerranée, carried out under the direction of the Association for the Advancement of Sciences. The conferences were finally held on 1 through 3 March 2010 in Jordan, 6 May 2011 in Malta, 17 to 20 May in Tunis, and 7 through 9 May in Rabat. From January 2010 until his death, Klapisch was an elected member of the Institute for Advanced Studies on Sustainability based in Potsdam, of which Klaus Töpfer is the Director.

== Honours, decorations, awards and distinctions ==
- Legion of Honour (2007)
- Knight of the Order of Academic Palms (1982)
- Prix Joliot-Curie awarded by the Société Française de Physique (1970)
- Three Physicists Prize of the École Normale Supérieure (1980)
- W. F. Rockwell Medal for Science and Technology de l'International Institute for Technology

== Publications ==
- Klapisch, R. (1969). "Mass Separation for Nuclear Reaction Studies". Annual Review of Nuclear Science. 19: 33–60. Bibcode:1969ARNPS..19...33K. doi:10.1146/annurev.ns.19.120169.000341.
- Hyperfine Spectroscopy of radioactive atoms (1979)
- Le rayon et la forme des noyaux exotiques (1980)
- Laser optical spectroscopy on francium D2 resonance line (1980)
- Laser spectroscopy of alkali atoms (1981)
- La Charte de l’environnement : enjeux scientifiques et juridique (2003)
- Projet Rubbia de réacteur nucléaire sous-critique (2000)
- Publications by Robert Klapisch recorded in INSPIRE-HEP.
