= List of Large Hadron Collider experiments =

This is a list of experiments at CERN's Large Hadron Collider (LHC). The LHC is the most energetic particle collider in the world, and is used to test the accuracy of the Standard Model, and to look for physics beyond the Standard Model such as supersymmetry, extra dimensions, and others.

The list is first compiled from the SPIRES database, then missing information is retrieved from the online version CERN's Grey Book. The most specific information of the two is kept, e.g. if the SPIRES database lists December 2008, while the Grey Book lists 22 December 2008, the Grey Book entry is shown. When there is a conflict between the SPIRES database and the Grey Book, the SPIRES database information is listed, unless otherwise noted.

== Large Hadron Collider experiments ==
LHC experiments
Experiment	Location	Spokesperson	Description	Proposed	Approved	Began	Completed	Link	Website
ALICE	IP2	Marco van Leeuven	A large ion collider experiment: specialized on heavy ion collisions, with proton-proton collisions as reference	??	6 Feb 1997	30 March 2010	N/A	Inspire; Grey Book	Website
ATLAS	IP1	Stephane Willocq	A toroidal LHC apparatus: studying the Standard Model and searching for Beyond Standard Model signatures primarily with proton collisions	Dec 1994	31 Jan 1996	30 March 2010	N/A	Inspire; Grey Book	Website
CMS	IP5	Gautier Hamel de Monchenault	Compact muon solenoid: same purpose as for ATLAS	Oct 1992	31 Jan 1996	30 March 2010	N/A	Inspire; Grey Book	Website
LHCb	IP8	Vincenzo Vagnoni	LHC beauty experiment: studying primarily flavour physics with B-hadrons such as asymmetries and CP violations	??	17 Sep 1998	30 March 2010	N/A	Inspire; Grey Book	Website
LHCf	IP1	Oscar Adriani	LHC-forward: measurement of particles travelling close to the direction of the beam, simulating cosmic rays	??	12 May 2004	30 March 2010	N/A	Inspire; Grey Book	Website
MilliQan	IP5	Christopher S. Hill, Andy Haas	Search for milli-charged particles at the LHC	15 July 2016	2016	2017	N/A	Inspire; Inspire	Website
MOEDAL-MAPP	IP8	James L. Pinfold	Monopole and exotic particle detector at the LHC - MoEDAL Apparatus for Penetrating Particles	July 2009	2 December 2009	January 2011	N/A	Inspire; Grey Book	Website
TOTEM	IP5	Simone Giani	Total cross section, elastic scattering and diffraction dissociation at the LHC	1999	18 May 1999	2010	N/A	Inspire; Grey Book	Website
FASER	IP1	James Boyd, Jonathan Feng	ForwArd Search ExpeRiment: Search for long lived particles and neutrinos at the LHC	2017	5 March 2019	N/A	N/A	Inspire; Grey Book	Website

MilliQan, FASER, LHCf, MOEDAL and TOTEM are much smaller than the other four experiments. Each is close to one of the larger experiments and uses the same collision point.

== Notes ==
1. Only a prototype has been approved and constructed so far, much smaller than the full proposed detector

== See also ==
Experiments

- List of CERN experiments
- List of Super Proton Synchrotron experiments
- List of Proton Synchrotron experiments

Facilities

- CERN: European Organization for Nuclear Research
  - PS: Proton Synchrotron
  - SPS: Super Proton Synchrotron
  - ISOLDE: On-Line Isotope Mass Separator
  - ISR: Intersecting Storage Rings
  - LEP: Large Electron–Positron Collider
  - LHC: Large Hadron Collider
  - AD: Antiproton Decelerator
