= Mattoni (disambiguation) =

Mattoni 1873 is a drink manufacturer specializing in mineral water from Karlovy Vary, Czechia.

Mattoni may also refer to:

- Mattoni NBL, an alternate name of the Czech National Basketball League
- André Mattoni (1900–1985), Bohemian-Austrian actor
- Virgilio Mattoni (1842–1923), Spanish painter
