= Prix Joliot-Curie =

French award in physics

The prix Joliot-Curie was established by the Société Française de Physique on 17 December 1956 as a prize to recognise the work of an individual in the field of nuclear or particle physics. It is awarded on an annual basis. It was named in honour of chemist and physicist Irene Joliot-Curie. Initially called the Irène Joliot-Curie Prize, it was renamed in 1958 to differentiate it from the Irène Joliot-Curie Prize awarded by the French Ministère de l’Enseignement Supérieur et de la Recherche (Ministry of Higher Education and Research).

The prix Joliot-Curie recognises outstanding work in the field of nuclear physics on even-numbered years, and in the fields of particle physics on odd-numbered years.

== List of prize winners ==
Year	Winner
1957	Georges Bouissières
1958	Henriette Mathieu-Faraggi
1959	Jean Crussard
1960	Raymond Armbruster
1961	André Lagarrigue
1962	Robert Walen
1963	Pierre Lehmann
1964	Christophe Tzara
1965	Georges Charpak
1966	Vincent Gillet
1967	Robert Meunier
1968	Jean-Paul Schapira
1969	Peter Sonderegger
1970	Robert Klapisch
1971	Lucien Montanet
1972	Jean Saudinos
1973	Pierre Darriulat
1974	Claude Détraz
1975	Jean-Pierre Vialle
1976	Joël Galin
1977	Michel Della Negra
1978	Jean Delorme
1979	Alain Diamant-Berger
1980	Marie-Claude Lemaire
1981	Philippe Bloch
1982	Bernard Haas
1983	Michel Spiro
1984	Nimet Frascaria
1985	Jean-Jacques Aubert
1986	Daniel Gogny
1987	François Pierre
1988	Paul Bonche
1989	Daniel Denegri
1990	Alexander Mueller
1991	Jean-François Grivaz
1992	Bernard Tamain
1993	Marc Virchaux
1994	Xavier Campi
1995	Patrick Roudeau
1996	Marek Lewitowicz
1997	Roy Aleksan
1998	Fazia Hannachi
1999	Reynald Pain
2000	Christian Cavata
2001	Jean Karyotakis
2002	Yorick Blumenfeld
2003	Guillaume Unal
2004	Sylvain David
2005	Gautier Hamel de Monchenault
2006	Christelle Roy
2007	Andreas Hoecker
2008	Francesca Gulminelli
2009	Jan Stark
2010	David Lhuillier
2011	Christophe Yèche
2012	Thomas Duguet
2013	Fabrice Hubaut
2014	Michel Guidal
2015	Maarten Boonekamp
2016	Navin Alahari
2017	Sylvie Rosier-Lees
2018	Stéphane Grévy
2019	Vincent Tisserand
2020	Marcella Grasso
2021	Caroline Collard
2022	Jérôme Margueron
2023	Matthew Charles
2024	Beatriz Jurado
