= List of Proton Synchrotron experiments =

This is a list of past and current experiments at the CERN Proton Synchrotron (PS) facility since its commissioning in 1959. The PS was CERN's first synchrotron and the world's highest energy particle accelerator at the time. It served as the flagship of CERN until the 1980s when its main role became to provide injection beams to other machines such as the Super Proton Synchrotron.

The information is gathered from the INSPIRE-HEP database.

| Experiment | Spokesperson | Proposed | Approved | Started | Completed | Link |
|---|---|---|---|---|---|---|
| CERN-PS-097 | Picasso, E. | 1969-05-19 | 1973-11-14 | 1974–06 | 1976–12 | INSPIRE |
| CERN-PS-130 | Gasparini, F. | 1971-07-23 | 1972-12-06 | 1974–02 | 1975–12 | INSPIRE |
| CERN-PS-131 | Martin, M. | 1972-05-23 | 1973-02-07 | | 1976-05-15 | INSPIRE |
| CERN-PS-132 | Stroot, J.P. | 1971-04-06 | 1973-04-04 | 1976-11-25 | 1976–12 | INSPIRE |
| CERN-PS-134 | Websdale, D. | 1969-05-19 | 1973-05-09 | 1974–10 | 1975–12 | INSPIRE |
| CERN-PS-135 | Schneegans, M. | 1969-05-19 | 1973-06-06 | 1976-05-20 | 1976–12 | INSPIRE |
| CERN-PS-136 | Lutz, G. | 1972-05-08 | 1973-06-06 | 1974-07-11 | 1975–11 | INSPIRE |
| CERN-PS-137 | Rossum, L.Van | 1973-08-23 | 1973-12-05 | 1977-01-20 | 1977-05-02 | INSPIRE |
| CERN-PS-140 | Blum, W. | 1973-10-10 | 1974-06-12 | | 1976-07-17 | INSPIRE |
| CERN-PS-141 | Dick, L. | 1974-09-04 | 1975-11-12 | 1976-03-18 | 1976–12 | INSPIRE |
| CERN-PS-142 | Bailey, J. | 1969-05-19 | 1974-11-13 | 1976-11-25 | 1978-08-25 | INSPIRE |
| CERN-PS-143 | Kullander, S. | 1974-09-23 | 1974-12-04 | | 1976-08-21 | INSPIRE |
| CERN-PS-144 | Baillon, P. | 1974-10-04 | 1974-12-04 | | 1975–11 | INSPIRE |
| CERN-PS-147 | | 1969-05-19 | 1975-04-09 | | 1975–12 | INSPIRE |
| CERN-PS-149 | Kilian, K. | 1975-08-22 | 1975-10-08 | | 1976-08-21 | INSPIRE |
| CERN-PS-150 | Uggerhoj, E. | 1975-09-10 | 1975-10-06 | 1976-09-23 | 1976–12 | INSPIRE |
| CERN-PS-151 | Tauscher, L. | 1976-01-15 | 1976-01-15 | 1976-07-08 | 1976–12 | INSPIRE |
| CERN-PS-152 | Piekarz, H. | 1969-05-19 | 1976-01-15 | 1977-01-20 | 1977-05-06 | INSPIRE |
| CERN-PS-153 | Baillon, P. | 1976-01-28 | 1976-03-18 | | 1979-08-09 | INSPIRE |
| CERN-PS-154 | Kilian, K. | 1976-02-04 | 1976-03-18 | | 1978-12-21 | INSPIRE |
| CERN-PS-155 | Klapisch, R. | 1976-03-04 | 1976-05-20 | | 1977-07-15 | INSPIRE |
| CERN-PS-156 | Dick, L. | 1976-04-10 | 1976-09-23 | 1977-01-20 | 1977-04-06 | INSPIRE |
| CERN-PS-157 | Barrelet, E. | 1977-02-04 | 1977-03-10 | | 1980-08-24 | INSPIRE |
| CERN-PS-158 | Tauscher, L. | 1977-03-02 | 1977-06-16 | | 1978-06-09 | INSPIRE |
| CERN-PS-159 | Pauli, E. | 1977-10-20 | 1979-01-24 | 1979-06-14 | 1981–09 | INSPIRE |
| CERN-PS-160 | Litchfield, P.J. | 1977 | 1977-12-08 | | 1980-08-24 | INSPIRE |
| CERN-PS-161 | Koch, H. | 1977 | 1978-01-19 | | 1980-08-24 | INSPIRE |
| CERN-PS-162 | Thibault, C. | 1978-02-23 | 1978-05-25 | 1980-11-27 | 1982-07-23 | INSPIRE |
| CERN-PS-163-1 | Walcher, T. | 1978-04-11 | 1978-06-29 | | 1979-12-17 | INSPIRE |
| CERN-PS-163-2 | Walcher, Th. | 1979 | 1979-11-14 | | 1980-07-20 | INSPIRE |
| CERN-PS-164 | Uggerhoj, E. | 1978-09-14 | 1978-10-18 | | 1980-04-01 | INSPIRE |
| CERN-PS-165 | Batty, C.J. | 1978-09-12 | 1978-11-16 | | 1980-04-03 | INSPIRE |
| CERN-PS-166 | Brueckner, W. | 1969-05-19 | 1979-11-15 | | 1982–11 | INSPIRE |
| CERN-PS-167 | Fiorini, E. | 1980-01-30 | 1980-05-22 | | 1981-05-27 | INSPIRE |
| CERN-PS-168 | Barloutaud, R. | 1980-05-12 | 1980-05-22 | | 1981–06 | INSPIRE |
| CERN-PS-169 | Wotschack, J. | 1980-08-29 | 1980-10-16 | | 1983–03 | INSPIRE |
| CERN-PS-170 | Dalpiaz, Paola | 1980-08-29 | 1980-11-27 | 1987-02-11 | 1988-08-11 | INSPIRE |
| CERN-PS-171 | Klempt, E. | 1980-08-29 | 1980-11-27 | | 1986-07-15 | INSPIRE |
| CERN-PS-172 | Bugg, D. | 1980-07-21 | 1980-11-27 | | 1986-08-01 | INSPIRE |
| CERN-PS-173 | Walcher, T. | 1980-08-22 | 1980-11-27 | | 1986-05-01 | INSPIRE |
| CERN-PS-174 | Davies, J.D. | 1980-08-28 | 1980-12-11 | | 1986-07-15 | INSPIRE |
| CERN-PS-175 | Simons, Leopold M. | 1980 | 1980-12-11 | 1987–06 | 1988-10-14 | INSPIRE |
| CERN-PS-176 | Poth, H. | 1980-08-29 | 1980-12-11 | | 1985–12 | INSPIRE |
| CERN-PS-177 | Rey-Campagnolle, Marcelle | 1980-07-03 | 1980-12-11 | 1987-06-03 | 1988-11-15 | INSPIRE |
| CERN-PS-178 | Bressani, T. | 1980-08-25 | 1980-12-11 | | 1986-08-01 | INSPIRE |
| CERN-PS-179 | Piragino, G. | 1980-08-31 | 1980-12-11 | | 1986-07-15 | INSPIRE |
| CERN-PS-180 | Baldo-Ceolin, M. | 1980-10-30 | 1981-03-19 | | 1984-08-09 | INSPIRE |
| CERN-PS-181 | Winter, K. | 1981-02-19 | 1981-03-19 | | 1983–03 | INSPIRE |
| CERN-PS-182 | Tauscher, L. | 1981-01-09 | 1981-05-21 | | 1986-07-01 | INSPIRE |
| CERN-PS-183 | Smith, Gerald A. | 1980-08-18 | 1981-05-21 | | 1986-08-01 | INSPIRE |
| CERN-PS-184 | Garreta, D. | 1980-12-19 | 1981-05-21 | | 1985–12 | INSPIRE |
| CERN-PS-185 | Roehrich, Klaus R. | 1981-08-27 | 1981-10-22 | 1984 | 1991-12-15 | INSPIRE |
| CERN-PS-185-2 | Roehrich, Klaus | 1992–01 | 1992-11-26 | 1994–07 | 1995-06-15 | INSPIRE |
| CERN-PS-185-3 | Roehrich, Klaus | 1969-05-19 | 1995-06-15 | | 1996 | INSPIRE |
| CERN-PS-186 | Egidy, T.von | 1980-08-20 | 1981-10-22 | | 1986-07-15 | INSPIRE |
| CERN-PS-187 | DiGiacomo, N. | 1981-09-22 | 1981-10-22 | | 1984–06 | INSPIRE |
| CERN-PS-188 | Uggerhoj, E. | 1981-10-29 | 1981-12-09 | | 1985–08 | INSPIRE |
| CERN-PS-189 | Thibault, Catherine | 1981-11-16 | 1983-02-03 | | 1992–12 | INSPIRE |
| CERN-PS-191 | Vannucci, F. | 1983-02-25 | 1983-03-25 | | 1984-08-09 | INSPIRE |
| CERN-PS-192 | Friedlander, E.M. | 1983-03-22 | 1983-03-25 | | 1983-08-16 | INSPIRE |
| CERN-PS-194 | Uggerhoj, E. | 1982-11-29 | 1984-11-15 | | 1986-07-01 | INSPIRE |
| CERN-PS-194-2 | Uggerhoj, Erik | 1986 | 1987-02-11 | 1988 | 1990-09-11 | INSPIRE |
| CERN-PS-194-3 | Uggerhoj, Erik | 1969-05-19 | 1991-06-27 | 1992 | 1996-08-19 | INSPIRE |
| CERN-PS-195 | Pavlopoulos, Panagiotis | 1985-01-21 | 1985-09-12 | 1991 | 1996-07-08 | INSPIRE |
| CERN-PS-196 | Gabrielse, Gerald | 1985-03-22 | 1985-11-14 | | 1996 | INSPIRE |
| CERN-PS-197 | Wiedner, U. | 1985-10-11 | 1986-04-03 | 1989 | 1996 | INSPIRE |
| CERN-PS-198 | Bertini, Raimondo | 1985-10-16 | 1986-04-03 | | 1988-05-25 | INSPIRE |
| CERN-PS-199 | Bradamante, Franco | 1985-11-21 | 1986-04-03 | 1989–05 | 1990–12 | INSPIRE |
| CERN-PS-200 | Nieto, M.M. | 1986-01-16 | 1986-04-03 | | 1996 | INSPIRE |
| CERN-PS-201 | Rotondi, A. | 1986-01-21 | 1986-09-04 | 1990–08 | 1996 | INSPIRE |
| CERN-PS-202 | Macri, Mario | 1986 | 1987-02-11 | 1991–07 | 1996 | INSPIRE |
| CERN-PS-203 | Egidy, T. von | 1988–01 | 1988-04-07 | 1988 | 1993-12-31 | INSPIRE |
| CERN-PS-204 | Yamazaki, Y. | 1987–11 | 1989–06 | 1990–08 | 1990-08-05 | INSPIRE |
| CERN-PS-205 | Yamazaki, T. | 1991–01 | 1991-04-04 | 1991–09 | | INSPIRE |
| CERN-PS-206 | Bradamante, Franco | 1992–03 | 1992-06-30 | 1993–04 | 1993-09-30 | INSPIRE |
| CERN-PS-207 | Gotta, D. | 1969-05-19 | 1993-09-30 | | | INSPIRE |
| CERN-PS-208 | Hilscher, D. | 1993–04 | 1993-11-25 | 1994–06 | | INSPIRE |
| CERN-PS-209 | Jastrzebski, J. | 1969-05-19 | 1994-11-24 | | | INSPIRE |
| CERN-PS-210 | Oelert, W. | 1969-05-19 | 1995-02-09 | | | INSPIRE |
| CERN-PS-211 | Rubbia, C. | 1969-05-19 | 1995-06-15 | | 1997 | INSPIRE |
| CERN-PS-212 | Nemenov, Leonid | 1969-05-19 | 1996-02-08 | | 9999 | INSPIRE |
| CERN-PS-214 | Panman, Jacob | 1969-05-19 | 2000 | | 2002 | INSPIRE |
| CLOUD | | 2000-04-24 | 2006-03-01 | 2009-11-01 | Still running | INSPIRE |

== See also ==
Experiments

- List of Super Proton Synchrotron experiments
- List of Large Hadron Collider experiments

Facilities

- CERN: European Organization for Nuclear Research
  - PS: Proton Synchrotron
  - SPS: Super Proton Synchrotron
  - ISOLDE: On-Line Isotope Mass Separator
  - ISR: Intersecting Storage Rings
  - LEP: Large Electron–Positron Collider
  - LHC: Large Hadron Collider
