= Henriette Mathieu-Faraggi =

French nuclear physicist (1915–1985)

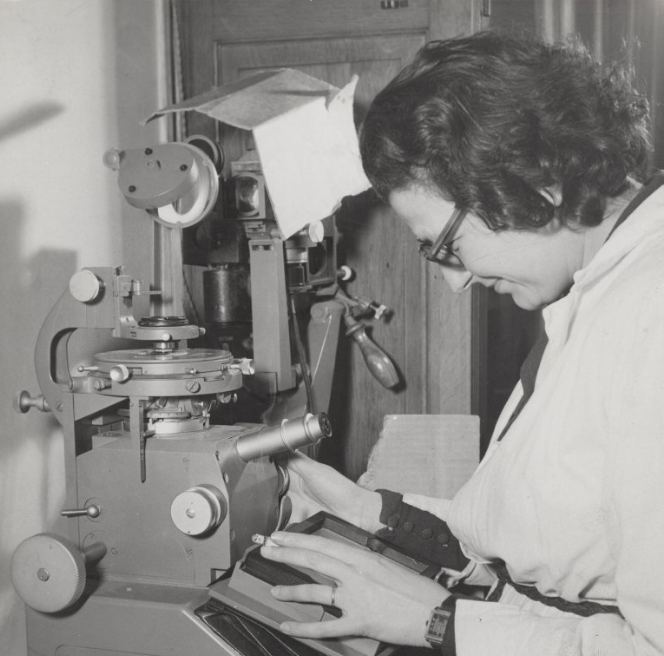
- Born: Henriette Faraggi; 26 November 1915; 17th arrondissement of Paris, France
- Died: 6 April 1985 (aged 69); Paris, France
- Known for: first woman to lead the Société Française de Physique
- Awards: Prix Joliot-Curie
- Scientific career
- Fields: Nuclear physics
- Workplaces: CEA
- Thesis: Mesure précise de l'énergie des particules lourdes chargées de faible parcours par imprégnation d'émulsions photographiques (1950)
- Doctoral advisor: Tsien San-Tsiang; Irène Joliot-Curie

Henriette Mathieu-Faraggi (26 November 1915 – 6 April 1985) was a French nuclear physicist. She is known for her contributions to the development of French nuclear research, contributing to the SATURNE synchrotron, the Saclay linear accelerator (ALS) and the heavy-ion accelerator GANIL at the French Atomic Energy Commission (CEA). She became the first woman to head the Société Française de Physique. She was also chairwoman of the International Union of Pure and Applied Physics (IUPAP)'s commission on nuclear physics.

== Early life and education ==
Henriette Faraggi was born on 26 November 1915 in Paris as the daughter of the engineer Ernest Faraggi (born in Saloniki during the Turkish era) and his wife Fortunée Simon, a Turkish Jew from Constantinople. Henriette was the second of the family's three children.

Initially interested in studying literature, she became interested in studying science at secondary school, preparing for the baccalaureate. She was in a philosophy class which covered elements of physics when she was inspired by the teacher, a "remarkable woman", who introduced her to the beauty of natural phemomena.

Faraggi studied for a Bachelor’s degree in Science Education at the Sorbonne, and prepared to take the agrégation examination in physics which was required to become a teacher. For this she needed to undertake a “Diplôme d’Enseignement Supérieur”, an introduction to research, through a year placement in a laboratory. She did her placement in 1936-1937 at the Physics Research Laboratory, headed by physicist Aimé Cotton. This convinced her that she wanted a career in scientific research rather than teaching, but in 1938 she married and had a child before divorcing.

After completing her studies in 1937, she published her first paper on work relating to the origin of circularly polarized light reflected by beetles which had been undertaken at the Sorbonne's Laboratoire d'Optique.

During World War II, she divorced and later recalled that there was no time for thinking about research.

She later studied under Nobel Laureate Irène Joliot-Curie at the Institut du radium.

== Career ==
=== State doctorate ===
Faraggi's early work on polarised light demonstrated that the structural coloration encountered in insects stem from reflection in a stratified transparent medium, as proposed by Lord Rayleigh, refuting Albert A. Michelson's alternative theory of metallic coloration.

Shortly after the end of the Second World War, on 7 July 1946, Faraggi joined the Institut du radium where she adopted a completely difference sphere of interest. Working as a researcher under Irène Joliot-Curie, she developed expertise in detecting ionizing radiation by means of photographic emulsions. In particular, she demonstrated her expertise as an experimenter by investigating the fusion of thorium and documenting her findings in a rapid succession of several papers.

Between 1945 and 1950, Faraggi worked on her State Doctorate thesis, under the supervision of Professor Tsien San Tsiang, using the nuclear emulsion technique developed by C.F. Powell and Giuseppe Occhialini. In March 1950, Faraggi was elected to the national committee of the French National Centre for Scientific Research (CNRS). Under the supervision of Juliot-Curie, in May 1950 she defended her thesis. It was titled "Precise Measurement of the Energy of Short-Range, Charged Heavy Particles by Impregnation of Photographic Emulsions" (French: Mesure précise de l'énergie des particules lourdes chargées de faible parcours par imprégnation d'émulsions photographiques).

=== CEA ===
In 1951, she joined the Commissariat à l’Énergie Atomique (CEA), specialising in nuclear physics. Her work involved the use of autoradiographs and photographic emulsions. Her original work found applications in metallurgy and biology. In parallel, she continued to collaborate with Juliot-Curie. In 1955 they published a paper together.

In 1957, Faraggi began to study nuclear structure, concentrating on the isotopes of nickel and zinc. Thanks to the availability of the variable energy cyclotron, in 1962 she was able to investigate heavier nuclei, for example those of tin.

In 1971 the Société Française de Physique ended nearly a century of male Presidents when they elected Mathieu-Faraggi as their President. She was the first woman to lead the Society. At the end of her time in office, she made a speech which concluded "if you find fault with some of my actions [...] in the past, don't say “it's because she's a woman”, but simply that I was not up to the task. And don't wait too long to call on other women to become president of our Society".

Faraggi was appointed head of the CEA's Nuclear Physics Department 1972, working in the role until 1978 when she was promoted to become CEA's overall director of research. From 1972 to 1978 she chaired the International Union of Pure and Applied Physics (IUPAP)'s nuclear physics committee. In 1975, she was a key player in the decision to build the Grand Accélérateur National d’Ions Lourds (GANIL), the large French accelerator in Caen.

== Personal life ==
On 10 February 1938, Faraggi married Fernand Bassé Parton (1910-1990), a young medical student with whom she had one child. The relationship ended in a divorce on 2 April 1941. On 3 July 1953, she married Marcel Mathieu (1901-1968), a chemical engineer.

Faraggi's death is recorded as 6 April 1985 in Paris after her remains were discovered on 8 April and deemed to be two or three days old.

== Honours and awards ==
She was awarded the Prix Joliot-Curie by the Société Française de Physique in 1958, in recognition of work in the field of nuclear or particle physics, the second ever awardee.

In 2026, Henriette Mathieu-Faraggi was announced as one of 72 historical women in STEM whose names have been proposed to be added to the 72 men already celebrated on the Eiffel Tower. The plan was announced by the Mayor of Paris, Anne Hidalgo following the recommendations of a committee led by Isabelle Vauglin of Femmes et Sciences and Jean-François Martins, representing the operating company which runs the Eiffel Tower.

== Selected publications ==
- Manuel de Photographie Scientifique
- Mesure précise de l'énergie des particules lourdes chargées de faible parcours par imprégnation d’émulsions photographiques

== See also ==
- List of women associated with Marie Curie and Irène Joliot-Curie
