= Kingdom of Parita =

Pre-Columbian political entity in modern-day Panama

- 550?-1522
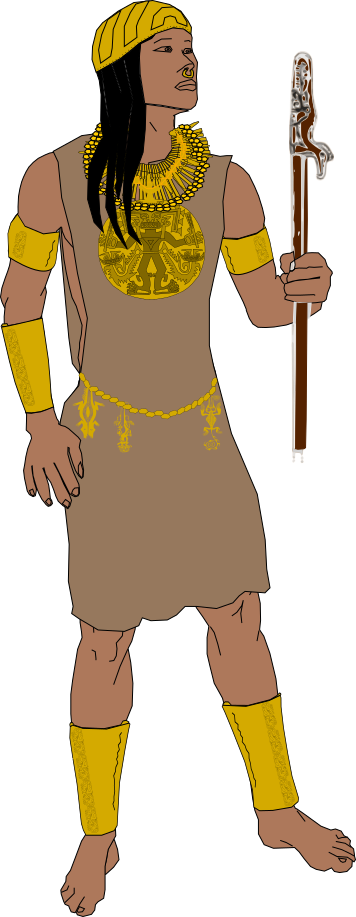
- King Antataura
- Status: Kingdom
- Capital: Parita
- Ethnic groups: Coclé
- Government: Monarchy
- Queví
  - 1460?-1519: Antataura
- Historical era: Pre-Columbian
  - Established: 550?
| Preceded by | Succeeded by |
| Gran Coclé | Province of Tierra Firme |
- Today part of: Panama

The Kingdom of Parita, also known as Paris, or the Cacicazgo/Chiefdom of Parita was a pre-Columbian political entity in modern-day Panama. At the time of Spanish contact, Parita was ruled by Antataura who was also known as Parita or Paris.

Parita's homeland was along the Rio Parita and Rio La Villa, which gave the settlement of Parita access to various aquatic resources and salt flats. The valleys near these rivers were vast savannas. Most of ancient Panama was an open savanna instead of the jungles of the modern day. These savannas were full of game that the people of Parita hunted. These savannas also offered land that was suitable for growing maize and cassava.

Parita's enemy to the north, Escoria (who was Antataura's brother-in-law), was in a constant state of war with Parita and there were often battles between the two. Parita, despite having the military benefits of its conquered territories was still occasionally defeated by the armies of Escoria.

== History ==
The site of Cerro Juan Diaz was one of the most important settlements in Parita's homeland and one of Antataura's residential sites. Cerro Juan Diaz was first inhabited around 550 A.D. and grew into what may have been the largest settlement in the area.

At some point, during the reign of Antataura, the kingdom expanded, conquering the kingdoms of Suema, Chicacotra, Sangana, and Guararé, in addition to several sub-chiefs. Antataura also hoped to eventually be able to expand north and conquer Escoria.

In 1513, two years before Spanish contact, invaders from Nicaragua (Chorotega or Nicarao people) attacked the neighboring kingdom of Tauraba. From Tauraba they went to the seashore, where Antataura and his army found them. Antataura defeated them, presumably freeing the subjugated province of Tauraba. From this encounter with the Nicaraguan invaders, Antataura gained great wealth and proved himself as a great warrior.

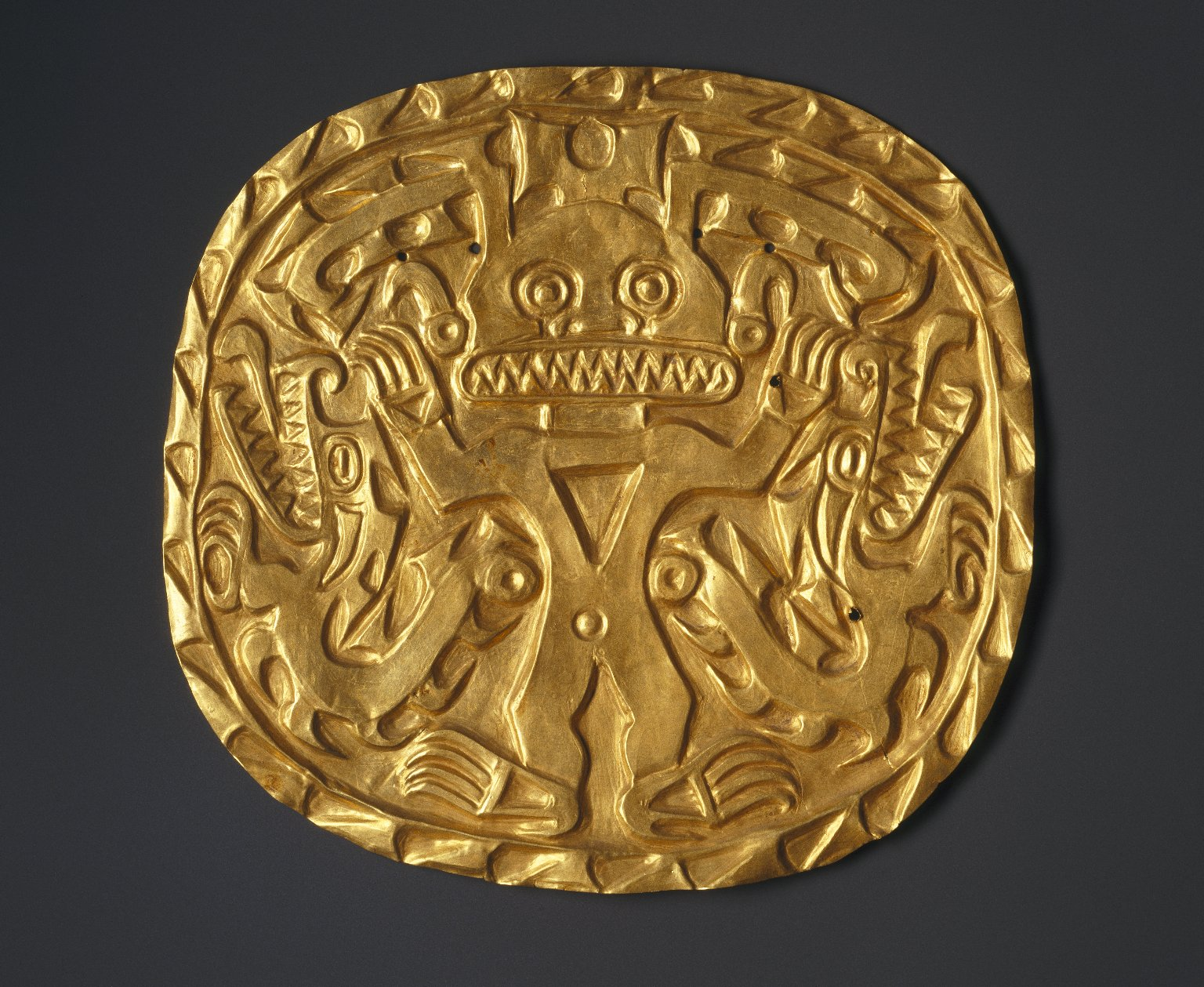
A golden pectoral, similar to the ones worn by Parita.

In 1519, king Antataura died, and Gaspar de Espinosa led an expedition to Panama in the same year and interrupted Antataura's burial rites. His burial rites were taking place in a bohío, where his remains had been desiccated in order to be preserved. He was placed in a hammock and dressed in cloth, which the Spanish tore off to find him covered in gold ornaments. This included cuffs and a helmet, along with gold disks worn on his chest and back.

Parita was conquered by the Spanish Empire in 1522 with the founding of Natá, which led to an abrupt population decline brought on by war and European diseases.
