= Gautier Hamel de Monchenault =

French particle physicist

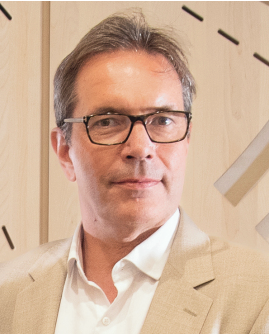
- Born: 1964 (age 61–62); Paris
- Education: Graduate School of Physics and Industrial Chemistry of the City of Paris - PSL
- Known for: CMS Deputy Spokesperson (2024-2026) at CERN
- Awards: Joliot-Curie Prize of the French Physical Society

Gautier Hamel de Monchenault (born 1964 in Paris, France) is a French particle physicist who has contributed to the Standard Model, CP violation and the discovery of the Higgs boson. He is a senior researcher at the French Alternative Energies and Atomic Energy Commission (CEA). Hamel de Monchenault is appointed CERN Director for Research and Computing for the period 2026–2030.

== Early life and education ==
Gautier Hamel de Monchenault graduated from ESPCI ParisTech. He completed his doctoral research at the University of Paris VI and CERN, focusing on high-energy particle physics.

== Career ==
=== DELPHI experiment ===
Hamel de Monchenault began his research career at CERN as part of the DELPHI experiment at the Large Electron-Positron Collider (LEP). He was involved in studies related to the Higgs boson and contributed to various physics analyses, including jet fragmentation functions and two-photon physics.

=== BABAR and CP violation ===
In 1992, he joined the BABAR collaboration at SLAC National Accelerator Laboratory, associated with the PEP-II electron-positron collider. There, he played a pivotal role in the design and construction of the DIRC particle identification system. As a visiting scientist at Berkeley Lab from 1996 to 1998, he contributed to the simulation, reconstruction, and physics analysis software. From 1999 to 2001, he served as the Physics Analysis Coordinator for BABAR during the observation of CP violation in the B-meson system, validating the theoretical predictions of Makoto Kobayashi and Toshihide Maskawa, who were awarded the 2008 Nobel Prize in Physics for their work.

=== CMS and Higgs boson discovery ===
Hamel de Monchenault joined the Compact Muon Solenoid (CMS) experiment at CERN in 1995. He has held various leadership roles within CMS, including Deputy Physics Coordinator and Deputy Spokesperson. His contributions were instrumental in the discovery of the Higgs boson in 2012. He has also been involved in the design and operation of the muon detection system and has contributed to the electromagnetic calorimeter (ECAL).

=== Leadership positions ===
From 2016 to 2020, Hamel de Monchenault served as the head of the Particle Physics Department at CEA-Irfu.

In 2024, he was elected as the Spokesperson for the CMS collaboration, becoming the first scientist from CEA to lead one of the four major LHC experiments. His leadership coincides with the transition to the High Luminosity phase of the LHC, a period marked by significant upgrades to the detector and the continuation of pivotal physics analyses.

Hamel de Monchenault will serve as CERN Director for Research and Computing for the period 2026–2030.

== Distinctions ==
Gautier Hamel de Monchenault is the recipient of the Prix Joliot-Curie from the French Physical Society in 2005.
