= Béatriz Jurado-Apruzzese =

Spanish nuclear physicist

Béatriz Jurado-Apruzzese is a Spanish experimental nuclear physicist who works in France as a director of research for the French National Centre for Scientific Research (CNRS), affiliated with the Laboratoire de Physique des 2 Infinis de Bordeaux (LP2i Bordeaux) in Gradignan.

== Research ==
Jurado's research fires fast-moving heavy atomic nuclei into light target nuclei, inverting the more common experimental technique in this field. By allowing the use of unstable heavy nuclei, far from the valley of stability, her method can create reactions that would otherwise be out of reach of experimental study. She has used this method, in particular, to investigate the decay modes and their probabilities for unstable heavy nuclei.

== Education and career ==
After undergraduate studies in physics at the Autonomous University of Madrid, Jurado received a Ph.D. from the University of Santiago de Compostela in Spain, obtained through research at the GSI Helmholtz Centre for Heavy Ion Research in Darmstadt, Germany.

She became a postdoctoral researcher in France, at the Grand Accélérateur National d'Ions Lourds in Caen, and then joined the CNRS in 2004.

== Recognition ==
Jurado was the recipient of the 2024 Prix Joliot-Curie of the Société Française de Physique. She received a CNRS Silver Medal in 2025.
