= Pierre Darriulat =

French experimental particle physicist

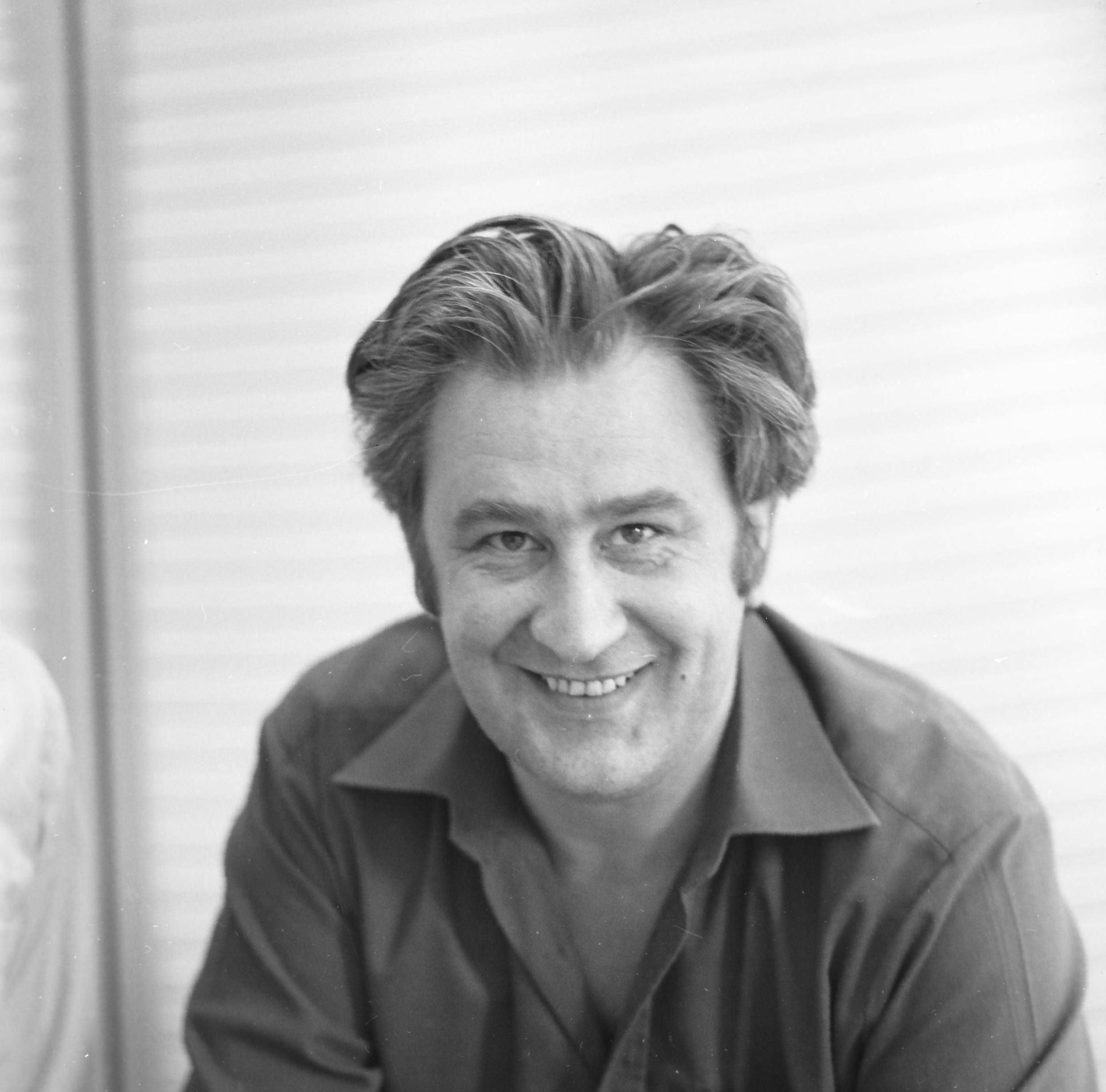
- Pierre Darriulat in 1980
- Born: 17 February 1938 (age 88); Eaubonne, France
- Education: University of Orsay
- Awards: 1973 Joliot-Curie Award; 1987 Grand Prix de l’Académie des Sciences: prix du Commissariat à l’énergie atomique 1985 Award from the French Academy of Sciences; 2008 André Lagarrigue Award; Honorary medal from the Vietnamese Ministry of Sciences and Technology; Honorary medal from the Physical Society of Vietnam; 2014 Vietnamese Friendship Medal; 2016 Phan Chau Trinh Prize for education and culture Honorary degree from the University of Pavia
- Scientific career
- Fields: Physics (Particle physics, astrophysics)
- Workplaces: CERN, Vietnam Academy of Science and Technology

Pierre Darriulat (born 17 February 1938) is a French experimental particle physicist. As staff member at CERN, he contributed in several prestigious experiments. He was the spokesperson of the UA2 collaboration from 1981 to 1986, during which time the UA2 collaboration, together with the UA1 collaboration, discovered the W and Z bosons in 1983.

== Education ==
Darriulat studied at École Polytechnique. He served his military service in the French Navy, and between 1962 and 1964 he spent two years at Berkeley, United States, before receiving a PhD from the University of Orsay in 1965 on research done at Berkeley.

== Career and research ==
Until the mid 1960s, Darriulat did his research on nuclear physics and took part in several experiments on scattering of deuterons and alpha particles. Darriulat was employed at Saclay Nuclear Research Centre, France.

After a few years at CERN as visiting physicist and CERN fellow, Darriulat was offered a tenure position in 1971. For six years he was a member of the research group of Carlo Rubbia, that made essential contributions to the physics of CP violation in the neutral kaon sector. He then took part in experiments conducted at the Intersecting Storage Rings (ISR) — the world’s first hadron collider. Using his experience from the ISR, Darriulat and collaborators proposed the UA2 experiment in 1978 at the commissioned Proton-Antiproton Collider — a modification of the Super Proton Synchrotron. Darriulat acted as the spokesperson for the experiment from 1981 to 1986. In 1983 the UA2 collaboration, together with the UA1 collaboration, discovered the W and Z boson, an important milestone in modern particle physics, as it confirmed the electroweak theory. The discovery led to the 1984 Nobel Prize in Physics being awarded to Carlo Rubbia and Simon van der Meer for their decisive contributions to the design and construction of the proton-antiproton collider. Prior to the discovery the UA2 collaboration made the first observation of emission of quarks and gluons in the form of hadronic jet – an important experimental support of the theory of quantum chromodynamics.

From 1987 to 1994 Darriulat held the position as Research Director at CERN, during which time the Large Electron–Positron Collider (LEP) began its operation. Subsequent, Darriulat turned to solid state physics, conducting research in the field of superconductivity on the property of niobium films.

In 2000, Darriulat launched a research group in Vietnam, in which he is still active. The group does research in the field of astrophysics. They first did research on extreme energy cosmic rays in collaboration with the Pierre Auger Observatory. Subsequently, the group turned to millimeter/submillimeter radio astronomy, studying stellar physics and galaxies of the early Universe. The group is now the Department of AstroPhysics (DAP) of the Vietnam National Space Center, all part of the larger Vietnam Academy of Science and Technology.

In 2011 Darriulat gave a talk The ISR Legacy at the international symposium on subnuclear physics held in Vatican City.

== Awards and honors ==
- 1973 Prix Joliot-Curie
- 1986 Member of the French Academy of Sciences
- 1987 Grand Prix de l’Académie des Sciences: prix du Commissariat à l’énergie atomique
- 1985 Award from the French Academy of Sciences
- 1997 Nominated for the French Legion of Honour
- 2008 André Lagarrigue Award
- 2014 Vietnamese Friendship Medal
- 2016 Phan Chau Trinh Prize for education and culture
- Honorary degree from the University of Pavia

== Most notable publications ==
- Darriulat, P. (2007). Réflexions sur la science contemporaine. Les Ulis: EDP Sciences
- Darriulat, P. and Chohan, V. (2017). The CERN Antiproton Programme: Imagination and Audacity Rewarded. In: Technology Meets Research. Hamburg: World Scientific, pp. 179-215
- Darriulat P. and Di Lella, L. (2015). Revealing Partons in Hadrons> From the ISR til the SPS Collider. In: 60 years of CERN experiments and discoveries. World Scientific, pp. 313-341
- UA2 Collaboration (1982), 'Observation of single isolated electrons of high transverse momentum in events with missing transverse energy at the CERN ppbar collider', Phys. Lett. B, vol. 122, no 5, pp. 476-485
- UA2 Collaboration (1983), ‘Evidence for Z0 ---> e+ e- at the CERN anti-p p Collider’, Phys. Lett. B, vol. 129, no. 1-2, pp. 130-140
- UA2 Collaboration, 1987, ‘Measurement of the Standard Model Parameters from a Study of W and Z Bosons’, Phys. Letter. B, vol. 186, pp. 440-451
- UA2 Collaboration, 1982, ‘Observation of Very Large Transverse Momentum Jets at the CERN anti-p p Collider’, Phys. Lett. B, vol. 118, pp. 203-210
- Darriulat, P. (2016), Looking at science and education in my second homeland, The Gioi, Viet Nam
