= Francisco Mateos Gago =

Spanish Catholic priest and professor of Theology

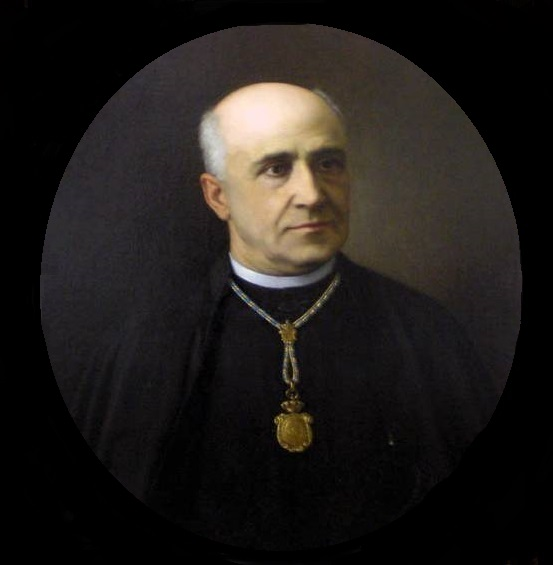
- Born: Francisco Mateos Gago y Fernández; 1827; Grazalema, Spain
- Died: 1890 (aged 62–63); Seville, Spain
- Occupations: Priest, theologian, writer and dean
- Employer: University of Seville
- Title: Canon of the Seville Cathedral
- Political party: Comunión Tradicionalista, Integrist Party

Francisco Mateos Gago y Fernández (15 June 1827 – 29 October 1890) was a Spanish priest and integralist intellectual who served as the Full Professor of Theology at the University of Seville and as dean of the same college.

== Biography ==
He studied Sacred Theology at the University of Seville, later becoming a Doctor on the subject at the Major Seminary of Granada and the Central de Madrid.

Gago served as a teacher for many years at the Seminario conciliar de San Isidoro y San Francisco Javier at Seville, holding several professorships before being ordered a priest. He was also a professor at the Seminary of Cádiz for a brief period of time.

A member of the Academic senate of the University of Seville, he served as Full Professor of Theology as well as of Hebrew while theological studies were suppressed by the Liberal government. Mateos would also serve as dean of Philosophy and Literature.

His obituary at the Boletín oficial of the Archbishopric of Seville praised him as one of the most beloved citizens of the municipality, remarking his reputation as a theologian and lauding his engagement in Catholic charity works, stating that:

"his apostolic zeal put him a thousand times on the side of the poor and the ill to be their consoler, as it happened specially in those times of 1854 and 1865 when the cholera epidemic was decimating the inhabitants of our beloved city. In those most sorrowful days, Mr. Gago offered his personal toils to the parishioner of Santa Cruz for the assistance of those choleraic, and fulfilled his promise so faithfully that many well informed people state that for many consecutive nights he didn't even sleep, staying as a zealous sentinel at the feet of his room's window while holding the box with the Anointing of the sick oils waiting for any notice."

The same bulletin remarked Gago's involvement during the Sexenio Revolucionario in the Catholic Church's successful campaign to drive away Protestant preachers who had installed at Seville thanks to the recent religious freedom laws. He also took part in the movement for the preservation of the city's religious monuments, writing many articles and letters against the decree of minister Ruiz Zorrilla which would expropriate from the Churches their public displays of art.

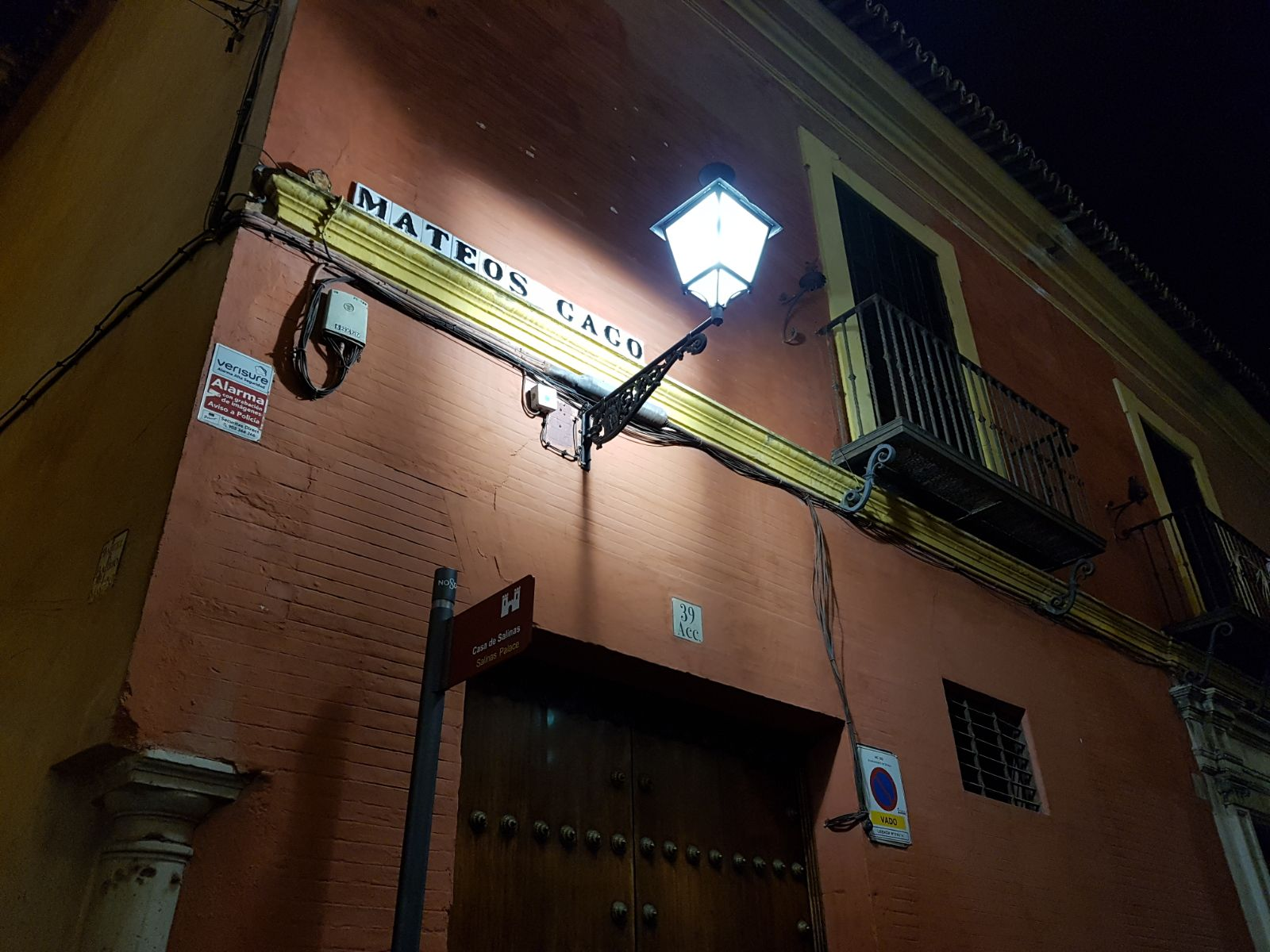
Mateos Gago Street in Sevilla.

Gago took part at the First Vatican Council as a consulting theologian for the apostolic vicar of Gibraltar. He was later awarded the title of Prosinodal Judge by cardinal González, apart from other condecorations from the Archdiocese of Seville and other sees. He rejected all civil awards as the Orden de Beneficencia the Spanish state was planning to give him.

Gago stood out as one of the most relevant writers of El Oriente (1869-1873) and directed the main archeological magazine of Seville. He also participated on weekly newspapers La verdad católica and La semana católica, and in the traditionalist El Siglo Futuro, based at Madrid. Originally a staunch carlist, he rejected the movement in 1888 and joined the Integrist Party of Ramón Nocedal. His main works as a theologian and apologist were afterwards compiled in various tomes under the name Colección de opúsculos.

A fervent opposer of darwinism, he was protagonist of many conflicts with fellow professor Antonio Machado Núñez (1815-1896). Gago would later found the Sevillan Academy for Archeological Studies.

His remains are placed on the Panteón de Sevillanos Ilustres in Seville, where he served as Cathedral canon. Since 1893, one street of the city center bears his name. One of the main streets of Grazalema, his birth town, was also named after him.

== Works ==
- Carta a Don Federico Rubio con motivo de su discurso en las Cortes de febrero de 1869 (Seville, 1869)
- Colección de opúsculos. Tomo I (Sevilla, 1869).
- ———. Tomo II (Seville, 1877).
- ———. Tomo III (Seville, 1877).
- ———. Tomo IV (Seville, 1879).
- ———. Tomo V (Seville, 1881).
- ———. Tomo VI (Seville, 1884).
- ———. Tomo VII (Seville, 1887).
- La iglesia de San Miguel de Jerez de la Frontera. Contestación a una carta de Don Modesto de Castro (Jerez, 1873)
- Juana la Papisa. Contestación a un articulista papisero de Santander (Seville, 1878)
- El análisis filosófico de la escritura y lengua hebreas (Seville, 1882)
- Catálogo abreviado de la colección de monedas y medallas, etc. (Seville, 1892)
- Sobre los errores históricos del Señor Don Emilio Castelar (Madrid, 1899)

== Bibliography ==
- Checa Godoy, Antonio (1991). Historia de la prensa andaluza. Fundación Blas Infante.
- Gabaldón de la Banda, José Fernando (2017). Los opúsculos de Francisco Mateos Gago. Un retrato histórico y social de la Sevilla de la II mitad del XIX. Páginas del Sur S.L.
