= Virgilio Mattoni =

Spanish painter

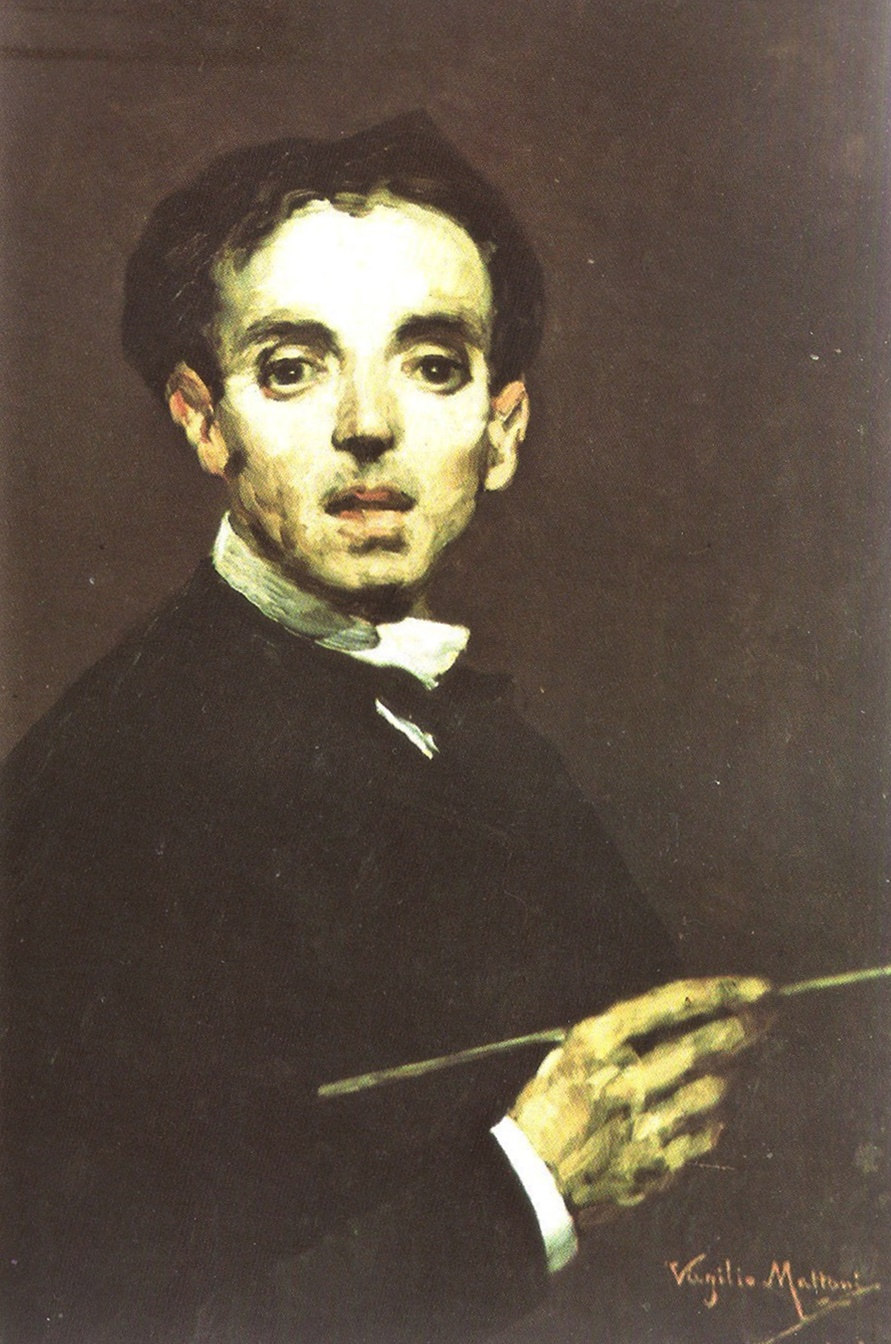
- Virgilio Mattoni de la Fuente
- Born: Virgilio Mattoni de la Fuente; 30 January 1842; Seville, Spain
- Died: 20 January 1923 (aged 80); Seville, Spain
- Occupation: painter
- Notable work: The Baths of Caracalla, 1881 and The Last of Ferdinand III, the Saint, 1887

Virgilio Mattoni de la Fuente (1842–1923) was a painter of post-romantic realism and a central figure in the modern Andalusian school of painters.

== Biography ==
Mattoni was born in Seville on 30 January 1842. He was the son of Felipe Mattoni and María Lutgarda de la Fuente.

Mattoni trained at the Provincial School of Fine Arts in Seville from 1856 to 1868. Among his teachers were Eduardo Cano, recognized for his historical paintings and winner of the National Exhibition of Fine Arts of 1856, and Joaquín Domínguez Bécquer, another representative of the Sevillian pictorial school of the second half of the 19th century. He completed his studies at the Chigi Academy in Rome, between 1872 and 1874.

He returned to the Santa Cruz neighborhood of Seville and opened a studio there. In 1886, Mattoni was named a member of the Royal Academy of Fine Arts of San Fernando de Madrid. In 1887, he was chosen as a faculty member of the Painting Section of the Provincial School of Fine Arts of Seville which became part of the University of Seville. In 1917, Mattoni was appointed Director of the Academy of the Applied Arts.

Mattoni died on 20 January 1923 in Seville at the age of 80.

== Work ==
Mattoni produced portraits and paintings with religious and historical themes. He also published articles on art history and was recognized as a gifted writer and poet. Commissioned to paint murals and altarpieces in a number of religious settings, Mattoni experimented with medieval techniques of gilding and embossing and used color and light as compositional elements. In 1881, he was awarded the Second Medal of the National Exhibition of Fine Arts for his painting Las termas de Caracalla. Although his view of the ancient Imperial thermal complex of the early third century CE, informed by his previous visit to Rome, cannot be matched with any archaeological evidence from the existing ruins, it is considered his most important work. Mattoni won the Third Medal in 1887 for his painting Las postrimerías de Fernando III el Santo which depicts Ferdinand III's last moments of agony as described in the Chronicle of Spain written by his son, Alfonso X the Wise.

== Gallery ==
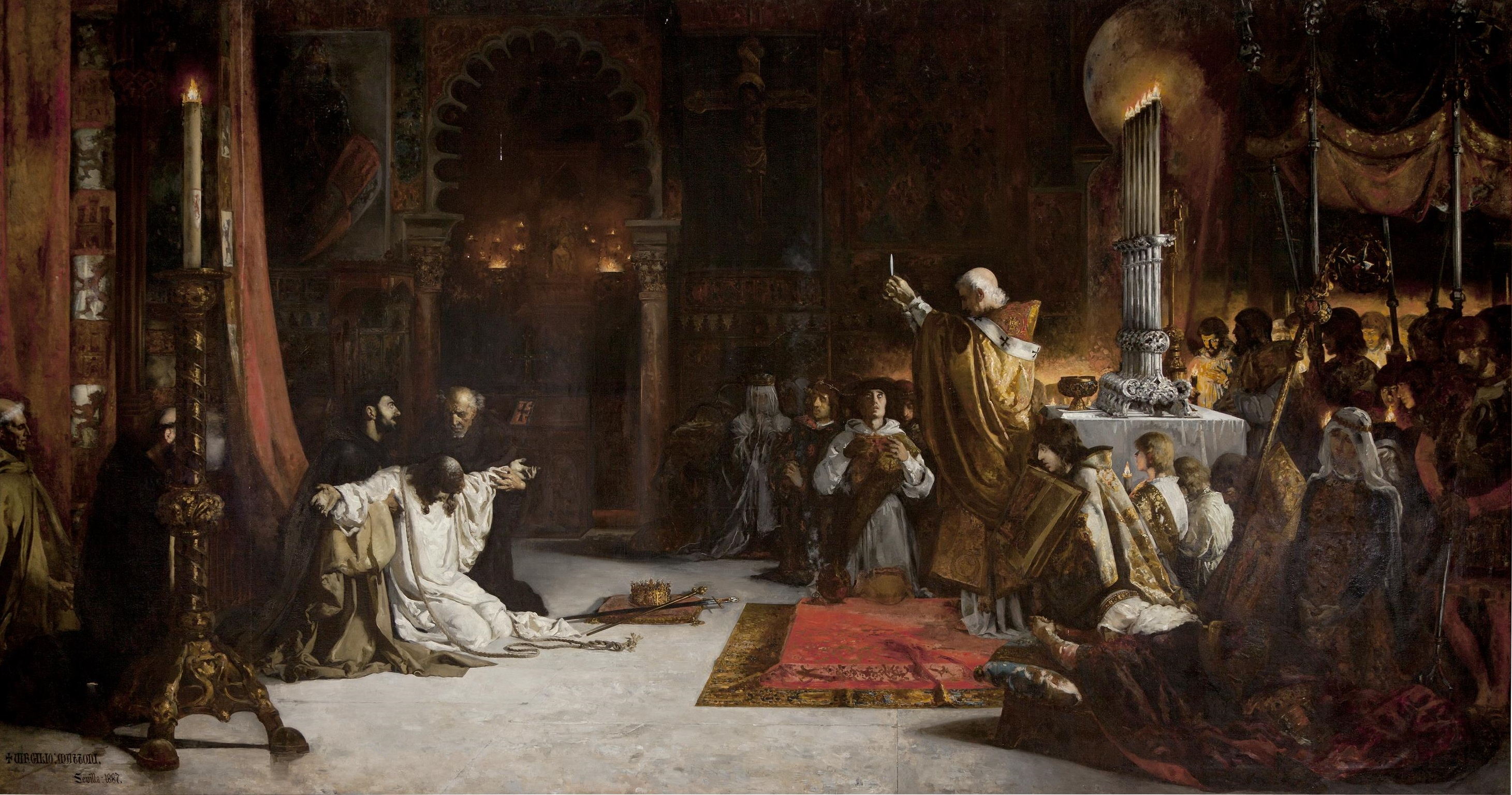
The Last of Ferdinand III, the Saint, 1887

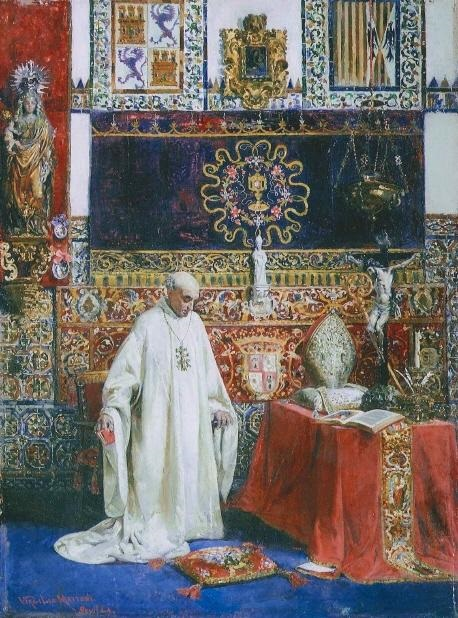
The Abbot

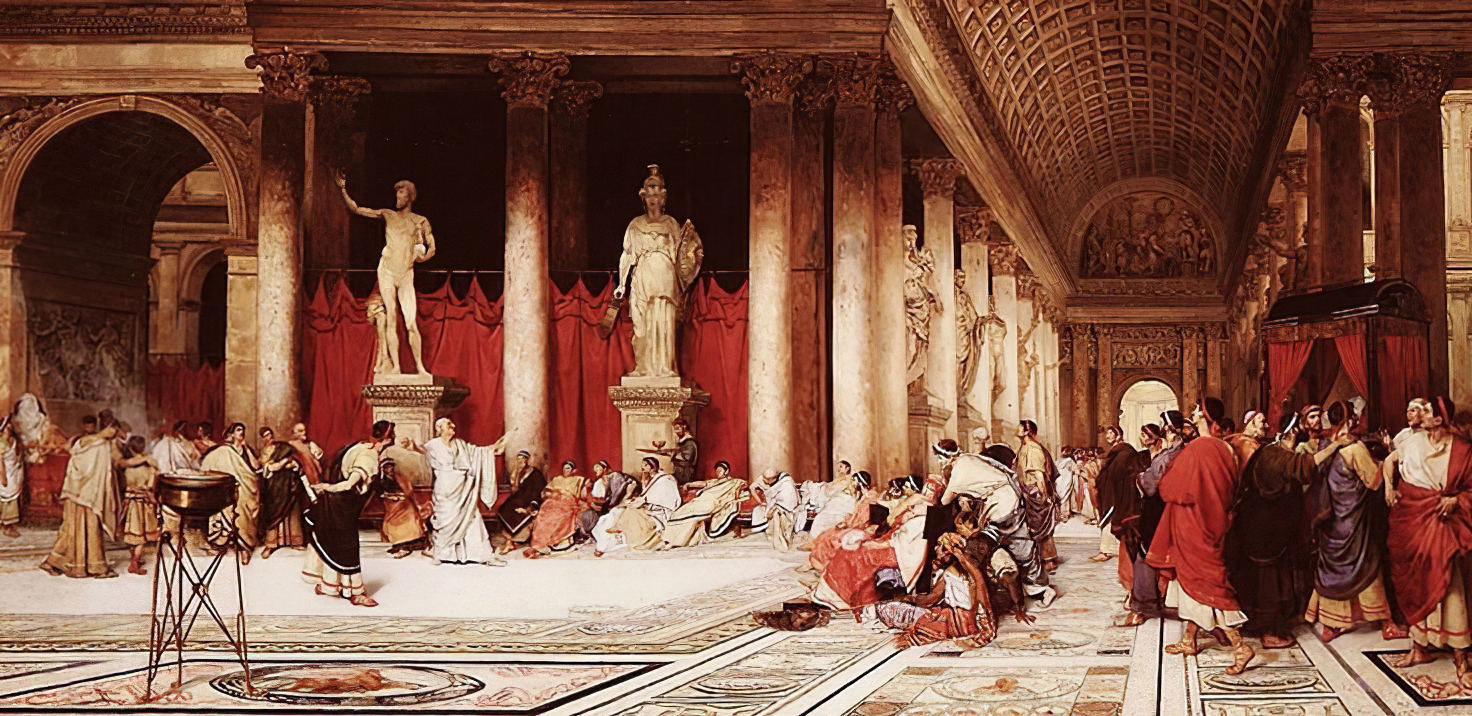
The Baths of Caracalla, 1881

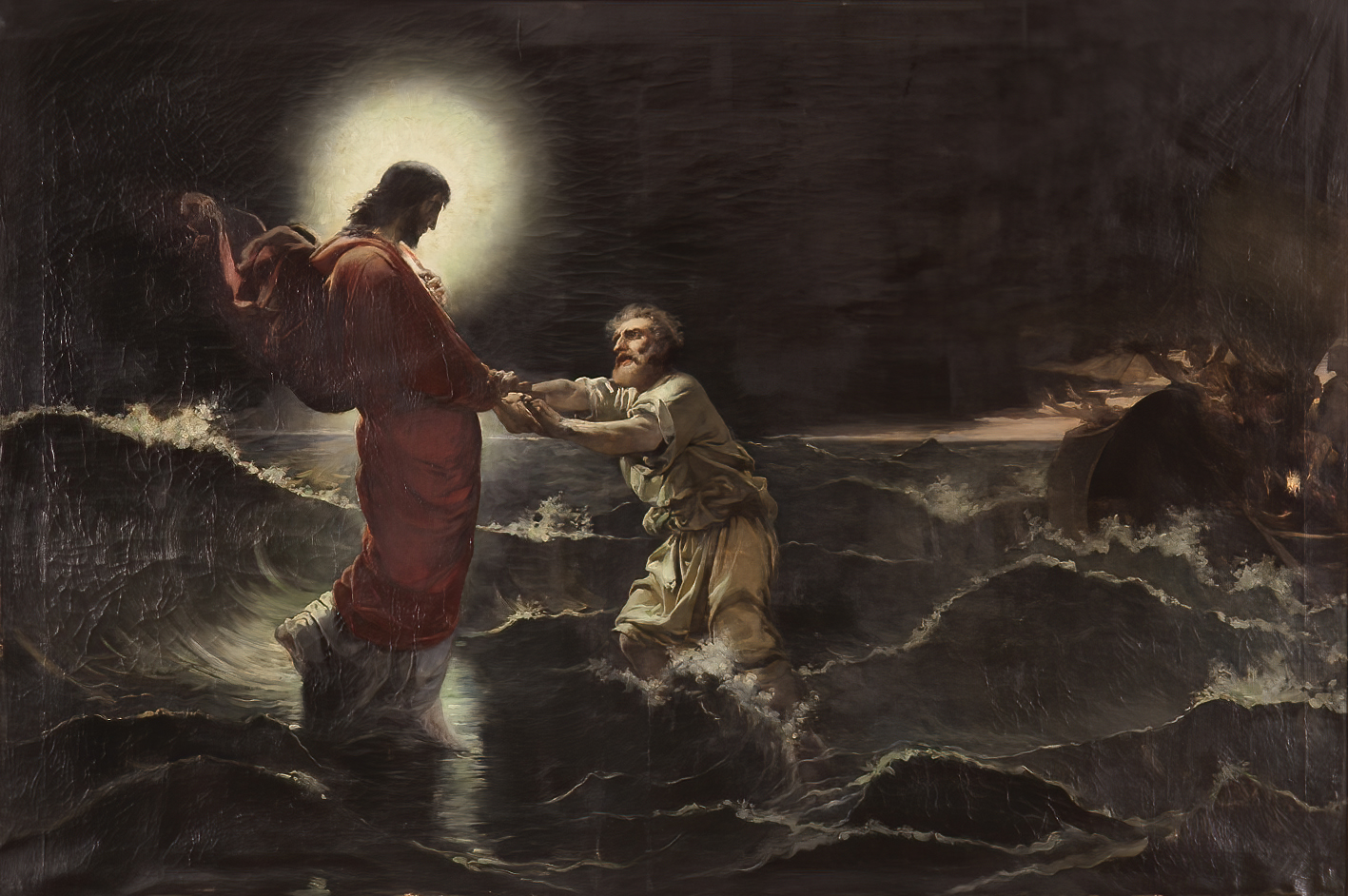
Christ Walking on the Waters
(Church of San Pedro, Seville)

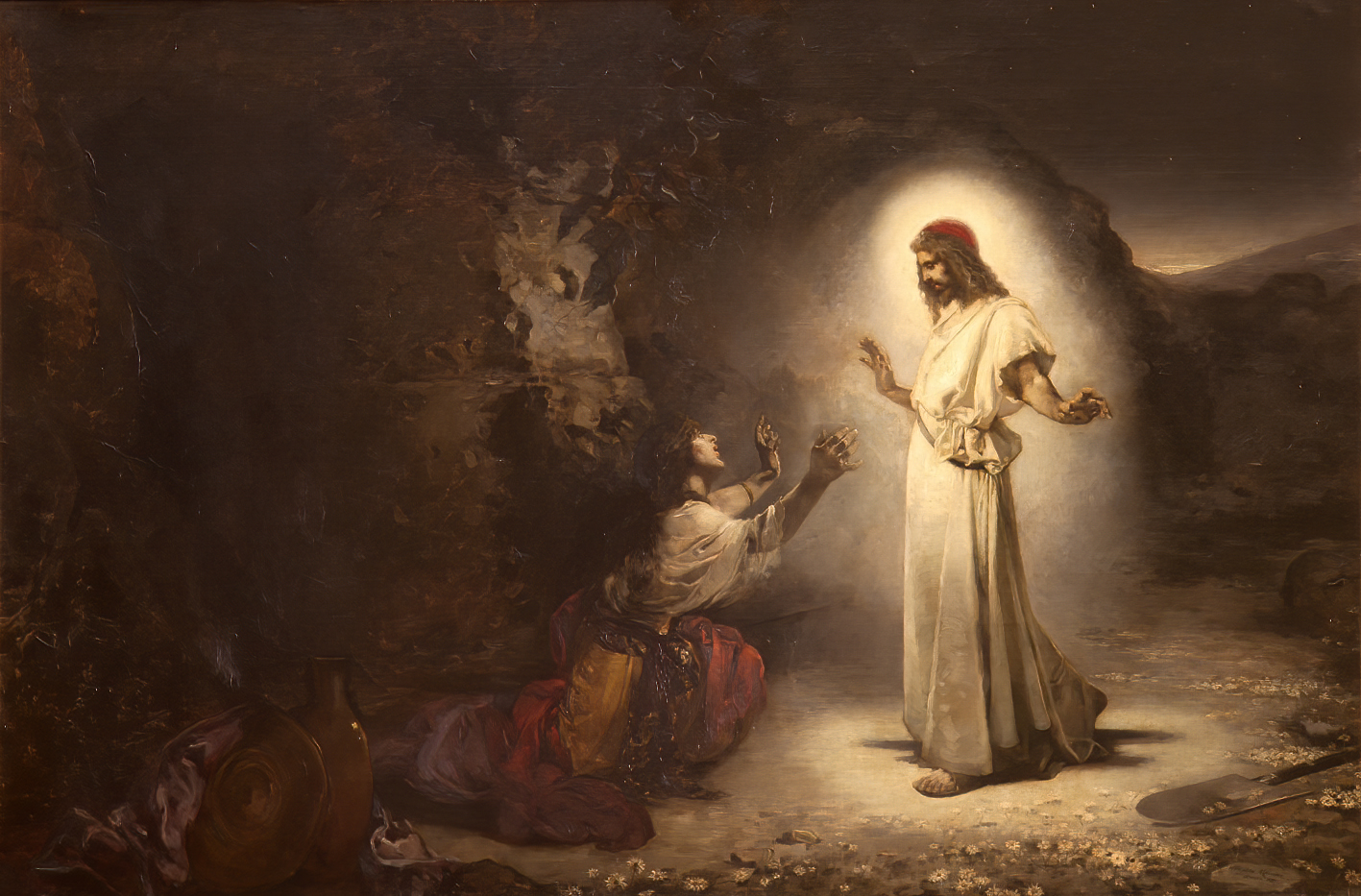
Noli me Tangere

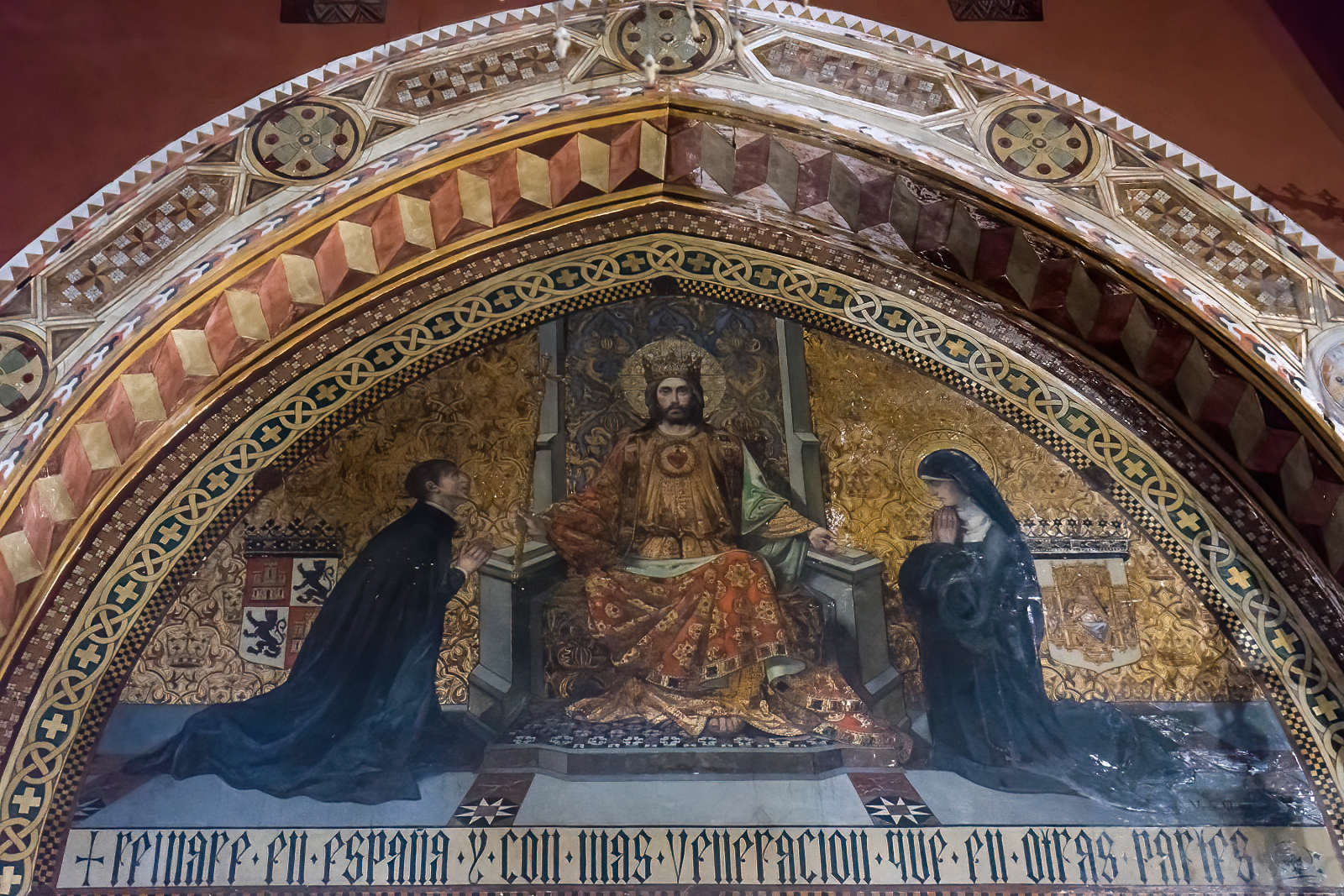
Christ the King
(Church of San Andrés, Seville)
