= Société Française de Physique =

French scholarly society

The Société Française de Physique (SFP), or the French Physical Society, is the main professional society of French physicists. It was founded in 1873 by Joseph-Charles d'Almeida.

== History ==
Joseph-Charles d'Almeida is credited as the founder. He obtained permission from the Vice-Rector of the Academy of Paris for the Society to hold meetings in the Salle Gerson, located between Rue Victor-Cousin and Rue Toullier. It held its first meeting there on 17 January 1873.

The Society had moved 44 Rue de Rennes by 15 January 1881 when it was recognised as a public utility by decree. In that year Éleuthère Mascart, former president of the French Physical Society wrote to Jules Ferry, Minister of Public Instruction and Fine Arts, requesting the creation of a marble bust of the founder which is now displayed in the meeting room of the French Physical Society.

In 1971 the Society ended a long list of male Presidents when they elected the nuclear physicist Henriette Mathieu-Faraggi. She was the first woman to lead the Society. In 2026 it was proposed that her name was to be one of the 72 women whose name is to be added to the 72 men who are memorialised on the side of the Eiffel Tower.

== Description ==
The French Physical Society is a state-approved non-profit scientific society aiming to promote the knowledge of physics. Its member include physicists living in France, regardless of background.

As well as promoting physics, the SFP also acts as a lobbying organization with French policymakers alongside other scientific societies, the like the French Academy of Sciences, French Society of Mathematicians, and Union of Physicists.

The SFP organizes a large number of events (conferences, workshops, exhibitions, etc.) for academic and general audiences. The SFP edits the Bulletin Newsletters and the review Reflets de la Physique. Each year, the SFP awards several prizes to physicists in honor of specific works or actions towards the promotion of physics outside the community.

The SFP is a member of the European Physical Society (EPS) and of the International Union of Pure and Applied Physics (IUPAP).

== Emergent Scientist ==
Emergent Scientist
- Discipline: Physics
- Language: English
- Edited by: Daniel Suchet

Publication details
- History: 2016-present
- Publisher: EDP Sciences
- Frequency: Yearly
- Open access: Yes

Standard abbreviations
- ISO 4: Emergent Sci.

Indexing
- ISSN: 2556-8779
- OCLC no.: 1006292028

Links
- Journal homepage; Online archive

Emergent Scientist is a scientific and educational open access academic journal, which positions itself as a journal that helps students get their first publication experience. It was established in 2016 on the initiative of the Société.

The main authors are the participants of the International Physicists' Tournament, who are given the opportunity to publish their articles with the solutions of the tournament problems in the journal free of charge (financed by the organizing committee of the tournament). Other articles on physics and mathematics can also be published in the journal, but at the charge of the authors. It is not necessary that articles are innovative, they can even focus on well-known phenomena, but they must study the problems from a scientific and didactic point of view. On the other hand, the journal places high emphasis on the quality of presentation of the results and their scientific substantiation. In a special section of the journal entitled Dead Ends, authors are invited to discuss theoretical approaches and experimental research that failed for one reason or another.

== See also ==
- European Physical Society
