= Eureka =

Eureka often refers to:

- Eureka (word), a famous exclamation attributed to Archimedes
- Eureka effect, the sudden, unexpected realization of the solution to a problem

Eureka or Ureka may also refer to:

== History ==
- Eureka Rebellion, an 1854 goldminers' rebellion in Ballarat, Victoria, Australia
  - Eureka Flag, the battle flag of the Eureka Rebellion
- Tehran Conference, codenamed Eureka, an Allied meeting during World War II

== Businesses and organizations ==
=== Businesses ===
- Eureka (company), a manufacturer of vacuum cleaners, now owned by the Midea Group
- Eureka Forbes, an Indian multinational home appliances company, now owned by Advent International
- Eureka Productions, an Australian-American television production company
- Eureka! Restaurant Group, California-based hamburger restaurant chain
- Eureka! Tent Company, an American company
- Kværner Eureka, a Norwegian engineering and construction services company

=== Other organizations ===
- Eureka (organisation), an international research and development funding and coordination network
- Eureka! Program, a teen girls' achievement program run by Girls, Inc.
- Asociación Atlética Eureka, known as Eureka, a former football team in Argentina
- Eureka Poker Tour, a poker tour in the central and eastern Europe
- Eureka Prizes, annual Australian science prizes presented by the Australian Museum, Sydney, Australia
- Eureka Youth League (1923–1984), a former youth wing of the Communist Party of Australia

== Media and entertainment ==
=== Characters ===
- Eureka O'Hara, an American drag queen, popularized on Rupaul's Drag Race
- Eureka (Oz), Dorothy Gale's cat in The Wizard of Oz, so named because Uncle Henry found her
- Eureka (Eureka Seven), a main character in Eureka Seven

=== Film and television ===
- Eureka (1979 film), an American experimental film by Ernie Gehr
- Eureka (1983 film), a British-American drama directed by Nicolas Roeg
- Eureka (2000 film), a Japanese drama directed by Shinji Aoyama
- Eureka (2020 film), an Indian Telugu-language thriller film by Karteek Anand
- Eureka (2023 film), an Argentine drama directed by Lisandro Alonso
- Eureka! (Canadian TV series), a 1980s Canadian educational series
- Eureka! (2022 TV series), a 2020s American educational series
- Eureka (British TV series), a 1980s British educational series
- Eureka (2006 TV series), an American science fiction series aired 2006–2012
  - Eureka (soundtrack), 2008
- Eureka TV, a British children's science show aired 2001–2005
- Eureka Learning Channel, a defunct Singaporean educational television channel

=== Music ===
- Eureka (The Bible album), 1988
- Eureka (Jim O'Rourke album), whose title track was featured in the 2000 film
- Eureka (Mother Mother album)
- Eureka (Rooney album), 2010
- Eureka (Leslie Clio album)
- "Eureka" (Sakanaction song), 2014, by Sakanaction
- "Eureka" (Gen Hoshino song), 2025 song by Gen Hoshino

=== Literature ===
- Eureka (University of Cambridge magazine), published by the Cambridge University Mathematical Society
- Eureka (Italian magazine), a monthly comic magazine published between 1967 and 1989
- Eureka (Japanese magazine), a monthly general art magazine with a focus on poetry and criticism
- Eureka: A Prose Poem, a 1848 essay by Edgar Allan Poe
- Eureka, a monthly science magazine for primary school students in Malayalam language published by Kerala Sasthra Sahithya Parishad, Kerala, India
- Eureka (journal), the original name of the Canadian mathematical problem-solving journal Crux Mathematicorum

=== Other uses in media and entertainment ===
- Eureka (musical), a 2004 Australian musical
- Eureka! (video game), a 1984 text adventure
- Disney's Eureka! A California Parade, a former parade in Disney's California Adventure Park
- Eureka O'Hara, American drag queen

== Places ==
=== Australia ===
- Eureka, New South Wales, a suburb in Byron Shire
- Eureka, Queensland, a locality in the Bundaberg Region
- Eureka, Victoria, a small eastern suburb of Ballarat
- Eureka Tower, a 2006 91-storey residential building in Melbourne, Australia

=== Canada ===
- Eureka, Nova Scotia
- Eureka, Nunavut
- Eureka Pass, Axel Heiberg Island, Nunavut
- Eureka Sound, Nunavut

=== United States ===
- Eureka, California, the largest US city named Eureka
- Eureka, Colorado
- Eureka, Marion County, Florida
- Eureka, Miami-Dade County, Florida, part of Richmond West, Florida
- Eureka, Illinois
  - Eureka College
- Eureka, Lawrence County, Indiana, an unincorporated community
- Eureka, Spencer County, Indiana, an unincorporated community
- Eureka, Kansas
- Eureka, Michigan, an unincorporated community
- Eureka, Missouri
- Eureka, Perry County, Missouri
- Eureka, Montana
- Eureka Mountain (Colorado), a summit in the Sangre de Cristo Range
- Eureka, Nevada
- Eureka, North Carolina
- Eureka, Pennsylvania
- Eureka, South Carolina, an unincorporated community in Aiken County, South Carolina
- Eureka, South Dakota
- Eureka, Texas (disambiguation)
- Eureka, Utah
- Eureka (Baskerville, Virginia), a historic home near Baskerville, Mecklenburg County, Virginia
- Eureka, Washington
- Eureka, West Virginia
- Eureka, Polk County, Wisconsin, a town
- Eureka, Winnebago County, Wisconsin, an unincorporated community
- Eureka Center, Minnesota
- Eureka Center, Wisconsin
- Eureka County, Nevada
- Eureka Shipyard, a shipyard of the early 20th century in New York State
- Eureka Springs, Arkansas
- Eureka Township, Adair County, Iowa
- Eureka Township, Michigan
- Eureka Township, Dakota County, Minnesota
- Eureka Township, Valley County, Nebraska
- Eureka Valley (Inyo County), California
- Eureka Valley, San Francisco, California

=== Other countries ===
- Heureka, a science centre in Vantaa, Finland
- Eureka! (museum), in Halifax, West Yorkshire, UK
- Eureka, New Zealand, rural settlement in the Waikato District, New Zealand
- San Antonio de Ureca, also called Ureka, on Bioko Island, Equatorial Guinea; known as one of the wettest places on Earth

== Science, technology, and mathematics ==
=== Electronics and computing ===
- Eureka (OPAC), a library search engine developed by RLG
- Eureka, the transponder component of the World War II Rebecca/Eureka transponding radar
- Eureka: The Solver, a numerical solver for mathematical systems of equations, released by Borland, 1987
- Eureka-147, a system for digital audio broadcast
- Eureka Streams, an open source software project

=== Vehicles ===
- Eureka (1900 automobile), an American automobile
- Eureka (1907 automobile), an American automobile
- Eureka (airship), a Zeppelin NT owned by Airship Ventures
- Eureka (French automobile)
- Eureka (ferryboat), an 1890-built steam ferryboat now preserved in San Francisco
- Ameri-Cana Eureka, a Canadian ultralight aircraft

=== Other uses in science, technology, and mathematics ===
- Eureka (organisation), an international research and development funding and coordination network
- The Eureka, a machine for generating Latin verses
- Constantan, also known as Eureka, a metal alloy
- 5261 Eureka, an asteroid co-orbital with Mars
- Eureka Prizes, annual Australian science prizes presented by the Australian Museum, Sydney, Australia
- Eureka theorem, a result of Gauss that every natural number is the sum of three triangular numbers

== Other uses ==
- Eureka Diamond, the first diamond found in South Africa
- Eureka Poker Tour, a poker tour in the central and eastern Europe
- Eureka O'Hara, American drag queen

== See also ==
- EURECA (disambiguation)
- Eurekha, 1999 biography of Indian actress Rekha by Mohan Deep
