= EDELWEISS =

Dark matter search experiment in France

The EDELWEISS logo

EDELWEISS (Expérience pour DEtecter Les WIMPs En Site Souterrain) is a dark matter search experiment located at the Modane Underground Laboratory in France. The experiment uses cryogenic detectors, measuring both the phonon and ionization signals produced by particle interactions in germanium crystals. This technique allows nuclear recoils events to be distinguished from electron recoil events.

The EURECA project is a proposed future dark matter experiment, which will involve researchers from EDELWEISS and the CRESST dark matter search.

== Dark matter ==
Dark matter is material which does not emit or absorb light. Measurements of the rotation curves of spiral galaxies suggest it makes up the majority of the mass of galaxies; and precision measurements of the cosmic microwave background radiation suggest it accounts for a significant fraction of the density of the Universe.

A possible explanation of dark matter comes from particle physics. WIMP (Weakly Interacting Massive Particle) is a general term for hypothetical particles which interact only through the weak nuclear and gravitational force. This theory suggests our galaxy is surrounded by a dark halo of such particles. EDELWEISS is one of a number of dark matter search experiments aiming to directly detect WIMP dark matter, by detecting the elastic scattering of a WIMP off an atom within a particle detector. As the interaction rate is so low, this requires sensitive detectors, good background discrimination, and a deep underground site (to reduce the background from cosmic rays).

== Experiment ==
EDELWEISS is located in the Modane underground laboratory, in the Fréjus road tunnel between France and Italy, below 1800m of rock. A 20 cm lead shield reduces the gamma background, and a polyethylene shield reduces the neutron flux. All materials close to the detectors are screened for radiopurity. A dilution refrigerator is used to cool the detectors, built in the opposite orientation to most instruments with the detectors at the top and the refrigeration mechanism below.

EDELWEISS uses high purity germanium cryogenic bolometers cooled to 20 milliKelvin above absolute zero. The phonon and ionization signals produced by a particle interaction are measured. This allows background events to be rejected as nuclear recoils events (produced by WIMP or neutron interactions) produce much less ionization than electron recoil events (produced by alpha, beta and gamma radiation). The detectors are similar to those used by the CDMS experiment. Simultaneous detection of ionization and heat with semiconductors at low temperature was an original idea by Lawrence M. Krauss, Mark Srednicki and Frank Wilczek.

A major limitation of early detectors was the problem of surface events. Due to incomplete charge collection, a particle interaction near the surface of the crystal gave no ionization signal, so electron recoils near the surface could be mistaken for nuclear recoils. To avoid this, the collaboration developed new detectors with interdigitated electrodes. Different voltages are applied to a series of electrodes so the direction of electric field is different near the surface of the crystal, allowing over 99.5% of surface events to be rejected.

=== Results ===
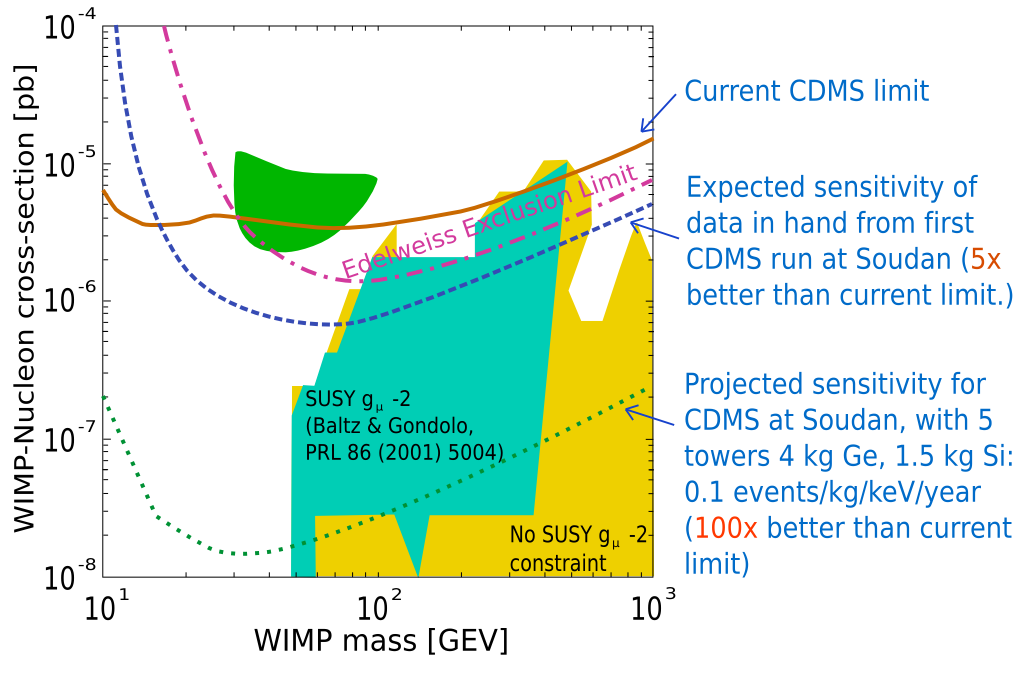
Fig A. EDELWEISS I results. With CDMS parameter space excluded as of 2004. DAMA result is located in green area and is disallowed.

The results from the first phase of the experiment (EDELWEISS I) were published in 2005, excluding WIMP dark matter with an interaction cross-section above ≈10^{−6} pb (at ≈85 GeV).

EDELWEISS-II ran 2009–10 with 10 detectors, that is, 4 kg of detector mass (for a total effective exposure of 384 kg·d) limiting high mass and low mass WIMPs, and axions. A cross-section of 4.4×10^{−8} pb is excluded at 90% C.L. for WIMP mass of 85 GeV. (Just above projected CDMS results in Fig A.)

EDELWEISS-III had 40 detectors. EDELWEISS-III conducted first science run 2014-2015 with results published in 2016.

EURECA design work will continue for operation after the EDELWEISS-III run. It is planned that EURECA would start operating after 2017.

== Collaboration ==
EDELWEISS is a collaboration of the following member institutions:

=== CEA – Commissariat à l'Énergie Atomique ===
- IRFU - Institut de Recherche sur les Lois Fondamentales de l'Univers
- IRAMIS - Institut Rayonnement Matière de Saclay

=== CNRS – Centre National de la Recherche Scientifique ===
- CSNSM - Centre de Spectrométrie Nucléaire et de Spectrométrie de Masse, Orsay
- IPNL - Institut de Physique Nucléaire de Lyon
- Institut NÉEL, Grenoble
- IAS - Institut d'Astrophysique Spatiale, Paris

=== Institutions outside France ===
- University of Karlsruhe (TH), Germany
- Forschungszentrum Karlsruhe, Germany
- JINR – Joint Institute for Nuclear Research, Dubna, Russia
- University of Oxford
