= European Underground Rare Event Calorimeter Array =

Planned dark matter search experiment

The EURECA logo

The European Underground Rare Event Calorimeter Array (EURECA) is a planned dark matter search experiment using cryogenic detectors and an absorber mass of up to 1 tonne. The project will be built in the Modane Underground Laboratory and will bring together researchers working on the CRESST and EDELWEISS experiments.

EURECA featured prominently in the ASPERA road map of Astroparticle Physics experiments in Europe.

== Dark matter ==
Dark matter is one of the significant unsolved problems in modern science. There is considerable evidence from astronomy and cosmology that a significant fraction of the mass of the Universe, and of galaxies is made up of non-luminous material. The nature of dark matter is currently unknown. However, a popular hypothesis is that it consists of Weakly Interacting Massive Particles (WIMPs), particles with a large mass, but which only interact with ordinary matter through the weak nuclear force, so the majority that pass through the Earth do not hit a single atom. The aim of dark matter search experiments such as EURECA is to test this hypothesis by searching for WIMP dark matter interactions. WIMPs are predicted to exist by supersymmetry theory, which predicts a wide range of scattering cross-sections down to 10^{−10}pb, corresponding to an interaction rate of ~1 event per year in a 1 tonne detector. Existing experiments such as CRESST and EDELWEISS have already ruled out higher interaction rates, but EURECA will search down to this lower limit.

== Cryogenic dark matter searches ==
Cryogenic dark matter experiments use particle detectors operating at millikelvin temperatures to search for the elastic scattering of WIMPs of atomic nuclei. A particle interaction inside an absorber crystal will create a large number of phonons, these thermalise inside a thermometer on the crystal surface, which records the rise in temperature. Such cryogenic detectors are used as they combine a high sensitivity with a low energy threshold and excellent resolution.

Dark matter experiments are located in deep underground laboratories, and use extensive shielding to reduce the background radiation levels from cosmic rays. Early experiments were limited by the remaining background due to radioactive impurities close to the detectors. Therefore, the second phase of CRESST and EDELWEISS used new detectors capable of distinguishing electron recoil events from nuclear recoils. Electron recoils are produced by alpha, beta and gamma particles which account for the vast majority of background events. WIMPs (and also neutrons) produce nuclear recoils. This is done by measuring an additional signal, which is much higher for electron recoils than nuclear recoils. CRESST detectors measure the scintillation light produced in a CaWO_{4} or ZnWO_{4} absorber crystal. EDELWEISS detectors measure the ionization produced in a semiconducting germanium crystal.

== EURECA ==
EURECA will take this cryogenic detector technology pioneered by CRESST and EDELWEISS further by building a 1 tonne absorber mass made up from a large number of cryogenic detector modules. The experiment plans to use a range of detector materials. This provides a way to show if a positive signal is due to dark matter, as the event rate is expected to scale with the atomic mass of the target nuclei. Whereas the event rate from neutrons will be higher for lighter nuclei.

The EURECA collaboration includes the member institutions of CRESST, EDELWEISS, and ROSEBUD dark matter experiments, and some new members. These are:

- University of Oxford
- Commissariat à l'Énergie Atomique
- Centre National de la Recherche Scientifique
- Max Planck Institute for Physics
- Technical University of Munich
- University of Tübingen
- University of Karlsruhe (TH)
- Forschungszentrum Karlsruhe
- JINR
- University of Zaragoza
- INR Kiev
- CERN

The collaboration spokesman is Gilles Gerbier. The experiment will be built in the Modane Underground Laboratory, in the Fréjus road tunnel between France and Italy, the deepest underground laboratory in Europe.

== R&D activities ==
EURECA researchers are currently involved in data taking and analysis for CRESST and EDELWEISS. In addition, there are various R&D activities under way associated with scaling up the detector technology to a 1-tonne scale. These include:

- Cryogenics: EURECA will require a one tonne mass to be cooled to millikelvin temperature. This will be done using large scale cryogenic technology, as used to cool gravitational wave experiments and the 27 km LHC accelerator ring.
- Scintillators: Research is being carried out to develop large radiopure absorber crystals with good scintillation properties at low temperatures.
- Detector readout: EURECA will require hardware and software to read out the signals from 1000+ detector channels.

== See also ==
- Dark Matter
- Weakly Interacting Massive Particle
- EDELWEISS
- CRESST
