= Pollock's conjectures =

Conjectures in additive number theory

Pollock's conjectures are a set of closely related conjectures in additive number theory. They were first stated in 1850 by Frederick Pollock, a lawyer and politician who contributed many papers on mathematics to the Royal Society. These conjectures are a partial extension of the Fermat polygonal number theorem to three-dimensional figurate numbers, also called polyhedral numbers.

== Statement of the conjectures ==
- Pollock tetrahedral numbers conjecture: Every positive integer is the sum of at most 5 tetrahedral numbers.

The numbers that are not the sum of at most 4 tetrahedral numbers are given by the sequence 17, 27, 33, 52, 73, ..., (sequence A000797 in the OEIS) of 241 terms, with 343,867 conjectured to be the last such number.

- Pollock octahedral numbers conjecture: Every positive integer is the sum of at most 7 octahedral numbers.

This conjecture has been proven for all sufficiently large numbers. Namely, every number greater than $e^{10^7}\approx6.59\cdot10^{4342944}$ is sufficiently large.

- Pollock cube numbers conjecture: Every positive integer is the sum of at most 9 cube numbers.

The cube numbers case was established from 1909 to 1912 by Wieferich and A. J. Kempner.

- Pollock icosahedral and dodecahedral numbers conjectures: Every positive integer is the sum of at most 13 icosahedral numbers. Every positive integer is the sum of at most 21 dodecahedral numbers.

These two conjectures are corrected and confirmed true in 2025.

- Pollock centered nonagonal numbers conjecture: Every positive integer is the sum of at most 11 centered nonagonal numbers.

This conjecture was confirmed as true in 2023.

== See also ==
- Centered polygonal number theorem
