= Eureka (1900 automobile) =

Defunct American motor vehicle manufacturer

The Eureka was an American automobile manufactured only in 1900. A product of Ough & Waltenbough of San Francisco, it was a 4408 cc rear-inclined three-cylinder with its engine under the back seat.

== See also ==
- Eureka (1907 automobile)
- Eureka (French automobile)
