= The Prince of Mathematics: Carl Friedrich Gauss =

2006 semifictional book by M. B. W. Tent

The Prince of Mathematics
- Author: M. B. W. Tent
- Language: English
- Subject: Life of Carl Friedrich Gauss
- Publisher: A. K. Peters
- Publication date: 2006
- Pages: 264
- ISBN: 9781568814551

The Prince of Mathematics: Carl Friedrich Gauss is a 2006 semifictional book by M. B. W. Tent, covering the life of Carl Friedrich Gauss.

== Summary ==
Tent's book covers Gauss's childhood, education, and adult life. In particular, it covers much of Gauss's childhood, including the main character learning to count at age 3, him figuring out the sum of the numbers from 1 to 100, his tutoring, and his discovery of the prime number theorem at age 15. The book also covers certain aspects of Gauss's later life, including his accomplishments in astronomy and surveying and his two marriages.

The book also includes several illustrations, including one of Gauss's notebook.

== Reception ==
Lisa DeKeukelaere, an alumna of Colby College, called the book "easily readable". However, DeKeukelaere noted that younger readers might not like the author's attempt to explain the math, but she also noted that older readers might not like the book's vocabulary or the "tedious, inconsequential conversations" that Tent had added. Linda Y. Shuey, of Western Albemarle High School, called the book "inspirational as well as informative" and recommended it to students from fourth grade onwards. Ross Andrew Gagliano, writing for Ubiquity magazine (a publication of the Association for Computing Machinery), called it "smallish yet thoroughly delightful" and "intended for all ages".
