= EURECA =

EURECA may refer to:

- European Retrievable Carrier, a European Space Agency scientific satellite mission
- The European Underground Rare Event Calorimeter Array, a dark matter search experiment

== See also ==
- Eureka (disambiguation)
- EURECA Program
