= Arthur Leopold Busch =

British-born American naval architect

- Born: March 5, 1866; Middlesbrough, North Yorkshire, England.
- Died: March 9, 1956 (aged 90)
- Occupation: naval architect

Arthur Leopold Busch or Du Busc (5 March 1866 – 9 March 1956) was a British-born American naval architect responsible for the development of the United States Navy's first submarines.

== Biography ==
=== Early life ===
Busch was born in Middlesbrough, North Yorkshire in England. When he was age 13, he apprenticed to Craggs & Sons of Middlesbrough, and at the age of 20 was employed as a draftsman while studying naval architecture at night. He relocated to Ulster, Northern Ireland in 1888, where he served as draftsman-in-charge at the Harland and Wolff shipyards in Belfast until 1892.

=== Career in the United States ===
In January 1892, Busch emigrated to the United States, and was employed as a draftsman at William Cramp & Sons Shipbuilders in Philadelphia. He was a longtime member of the Society of Naval Architects and Marine Engineers (SNAME) which became organized in 1893 in the state of New Jersey. In 1895, Busch moved to Elizabethport, New Jersey, where he was the shipyard superintendent at Lewis Nixon's Crescent Shipyard This shipyard is where the United States Navy's first submarines were built under Busch's supervision beginning in the late fall of 1896. Busch worked in unison with John Philip Holland to design and build the pioneering USS Holland, also known as the Holland VI design. This was the first commissioned submarine in the United States Navy, and purchased by the American Government on April 11, 1900 – a day later commemorated by the United States submarine community as "Submarine Day". Holland's company was then known as the Holland Torpedo Boat Company - the forerunner and precursor to the Electric Boat Division of General Dynamics Corporation. The United States government then ordered more submarines after the successful trials and purchase of Holland VI. These submarines were known as the A class or Plunger class. A prototype was constructed under Busch's direction at the Crescent Shipyard in the year 1900. This submarine craft was called Fulton, named after the American steamship pioneer Robert Fulton. However, Fulton was never commissioned into U. S. Navy service and was sold to the Imperial Russian Navy in 1905 for use in the Russo-Japanese War against the Empire of Japan.

=== Career in Japan ===
After Crescent Shipyard lost the contract from the US Navy for the B-class submarines, Busch was offered a position by Isaac Leopold Rice with Electric Boat Company, which had received a contract from Japan for the construction of five Type VII submarines for the Imperial Japanese Navy. These vessels were built at the company’s Fore River Shipyards in Quincy, Massachusetts. Busch oversaw construction of the vessels, their dismantling, transport to Seattle by rail, shipment to Yokohama and reassembly at the Yokosuka Naval Arsenal in Yokosuka, Japan. The project was done in complete secrecy, as the United States was officially neutral in the Russo-Japanese War. The entire project was completed in twelve months, and Busch was honored with the Order of the Rising Sun, 4th class by Emperor Meiji.

=== Subsequent career ===
After returning from Japan, Busch returned to work for Lewis Nixon as manager of the United States Shipbuilding Company in Perth Amboy, New Jersey. In 1909, Busch established the American Architectural Shipbuilding and Development Company, and proposed designed for miniature submarines to the Japanese government. The venture was not a success and Busch went to work for the New Jersey Drydock Company in Elizabeth, New Jersey and was later shipyard manager for the Moore Shipyards of the Bethlehem Shipbuilding Company, and advisor to the president of Eureka Shipyards in Newburg, New York. During his long career, Busch was responsible for the design and development of many ship classes for the United States Navy and contributed to their production at some of the country's largest shipyards through both World Wars. He retired in 1941, and died on 9 March 1956. After World War I, Busch changed his last name to Du Busc in 1919 - this was most probably due to the large amount of anti-German sentiment that existed in the United States during that time though his family lineage was of Huguenot origins.
