= Eureka, Texas =

Eureka, Texas may refer to:

- Eureka, Crockett County, Texas
- Eureka, Franklin County, Texas
- Eureka, Navarro County, Texas
