= Sanford L. Segal =

American mathematician

- Born: October 11, 1937
- Died: May 7, 2010 (aged 72)
- Education: University of Colorado, Wesleyan University
- Known for: Analytic number theory, Complex analysis
- Scientific career
- Fields: Mathematics
- Thesis: The Error Term in the Formula for the Average Value of the Euler's φ Function (1963)
- Doctoral advisor: Sarvadaman Chowla
- Notable students: Melvyn B. Nathanson

Sanford Leonard Segal (October 11, 1937 – May 7, 2010) was a mathematician and historian of science and mathematics at the University of Rochester. Mathematically he specialized in analytic number theory, and complex analysis. He wrote the textbook Nine Introductions in Complex Analysis (1981), and the tome Mathematicians Under the Nazis (2003), a historical recount from that period. He also taught courses in women's studies, and nuclear arms. He was on the Committee of Actuarial Studies at the University of Rochester.

== Life ==
In 1937 he was born into a conservative Jewish family.

In 1958, he received his B.A. degree from Wesleyan University with Honors in Mathematics and High Honors in Classical Civilization studies.

In 1959 he spent a year as a Fulbright student in Mainz, Germany.

In 1963, he earned his Ph.D. in Mathematics at University of Colorado under the supervision of Sarvadaman D. S. Chowla with the dissertation entitled The Error Term in the Formula for the Average Value of the Euler Phi Function.

== Career ==
After his Ph.D., he worked at the University of Rochester for 44 years until his retirement in 2008. In 1965 he received a grant from the Fulbright Program as a research fellow in Vienna, Austria. And in 1977, he received a grant from the National Institute for Pure and Applied Mathematics to teach in Rio de Janeiro.

In 1981 he published Nine Introductions in Complex Analysis with North Holland Press (a revised edition was published in 2011 by Elsevier, which had taken over North Holland Press). He later received a grant from The Alexander von Humboldt Foundation to research history of science in Nazi Germany. Princeton University Press later published the book Mathematicians Under the Nazis in 2003, which addresses the experience of mathematics academics in Nazi Germany. The book involved a lot of direct research and interviews with survivors and translations from German.

He translated from French the book History of Mathematics: Highways and Byways in 2009. In addition, Segal published more than 45 papers on mathematics, mathematics education, and the history of science.

He was a member of the Religious Society of Friends. He was also a member of Sigma Xi and of Phi Beta Kappa.

He married Rima Maxwell and had three children, Adam, Joshua, and Zoë.

He died on May 7, 2010.

== Academic publications ==
- Sanford L. Segal (1962). "On π(x + y) ≦ π(x) + π(y)". Transactions of the American Mathematical Society. 104 (3): 523–527. doi:10.2307/1993801. JSTOR 1993801.
- Sanford L. Segal (1962). "On π(x + y) ≦ π(x) + π(y)". Transactions of the American Mathematical Society. 104 (3): 523. doi:10.1090/S0002-9947-1962-0139586-4.
- S. L. Segal (1964). "A Note on Normal Order and the Euler fe Function". Journal of the London Mathematical Society. s1-39 (1): 400–404. doi:10.1112/jlms/s1-39.1.400.
- Sanford L. Segal (1965). "A note on the average order of number-theoretic error terms". Duke Mathematical Journal. 32 (1965): 279–284. doi:10.1215/S0012-7094-65-03227-8.
- S. L. Segal (1965). "On Non-Decreasing Normal Orders". Journal of the London Mathematical Society. s1-40 (1): 459–466. doi:10.1112/jlms/s1-40.1.459.
- Sanford L. Segal (1965). "Errata: "A note on the average order of number-theoretic error terms,"vol. 32 (1965) pp. 279–284". Duke Mathematical Journal. 32 (1965): 765. doi:10.1215/S0012-7094-65-03280-1.
- Segal, S.L. (1981). Nine Introductions in Complex Analysis. Notas de matematica fisica. Elsevier Science. ISBN 9780444862266. LCCN lc81009568.
- S. L. Segal (1987). "Is Female Math Anxiety Real?". Science. 237 (4813): 350. Bibcode:1987Sci...237..350S. doi:10.1126/science.237.4813.350-a. PMID 3603021. S2CID 2369790.
- Sanford L. Segal (1992). "Ernst August Weiss: Mathematical Pedagogical Innovation in the Third Reich". In Sergei S. Demidov; Menso Folkerts; David E. Rowe; et al. (eds.). Amphora — Festsschrift for Hans Wussing on the Occasion of his 65th Birthday. Basel: Springer. pp. 693–704. doi:10.1007/978-3-0348-8599-7. ISBN 978-3-0348-9696-2.
- Andreas Steup; Sanford L. Segal (1996). "German Universities". Science. 274 (5289): 905b. Bibcode:1996Sci...274..905S. doi:10.1126/science.274.5289.905b. PMID 17798609.
- S. L. Segal (1996). "German Universities". Science. 274 (5289): 901d–905. doi:10.1126/science.274.5289.901d. PMID 17798609. S2CID 220099378.
- Segal, S.L. (2003). Mathematicians Under the Nazis. Princeton University Press. ISBN 9780691004518. LCCN 02070399.
