= Cherenkov Telescope Array Observatory =

Multinational cosmological project

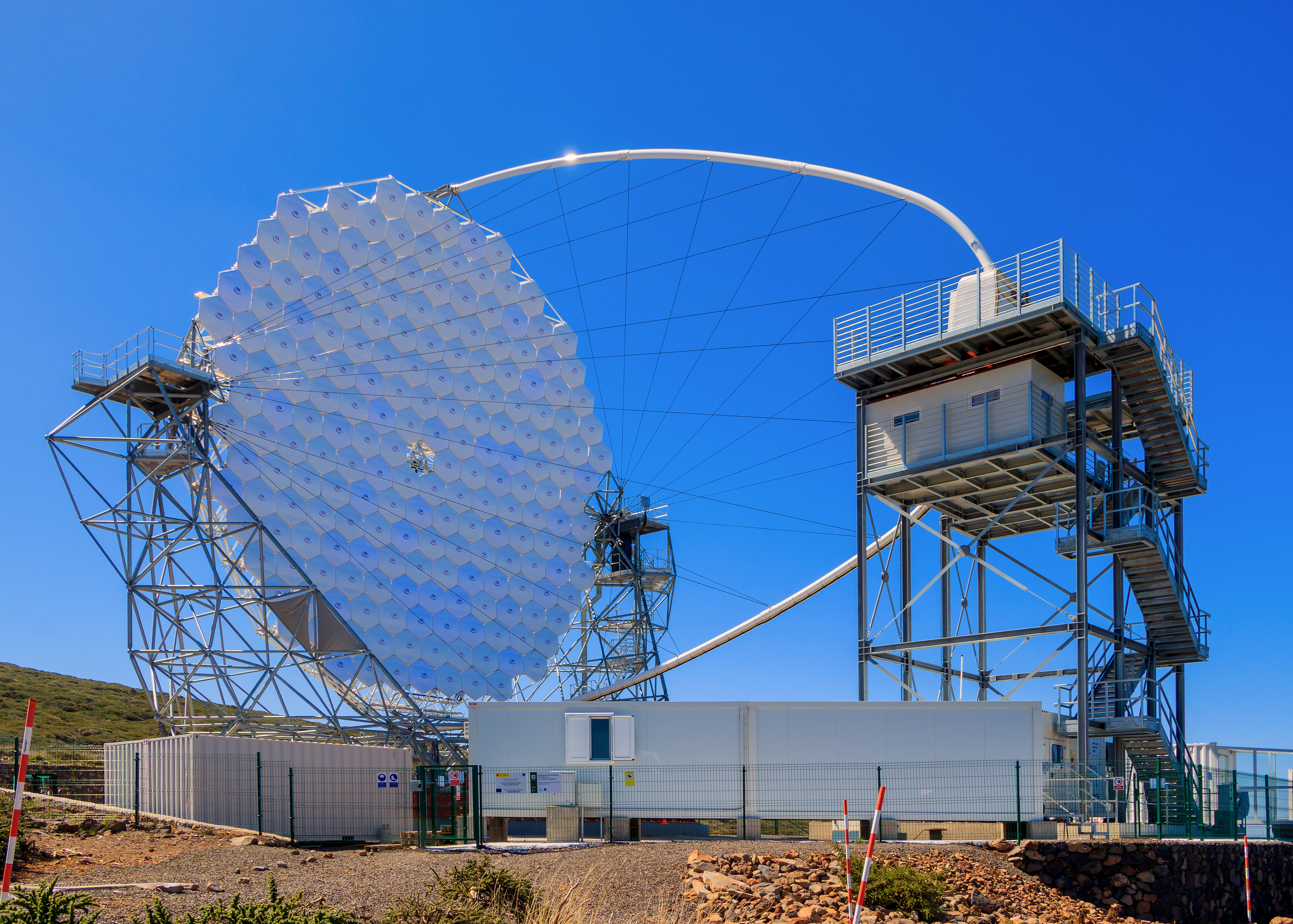
- Large-Sized-Telescope LST-1 (2019)

- Alternative names: CTAO
- Telescope style: nonprofit organization
- Website: www.ctao.org
- Related media on Commons

The Cherenkov Telescope Array Observatory (CTAO) is a multinational project to build a new generation of ground-based gamma-ray instruments in the energy range extending from some tens of GeV to about 300 TeV. It is proposed as an open observatory and will consist of two arrays of imaging atmospheric Cherenkov telescopes, a first array in the Northern Hemisphere, on the Spanish island of La Palma, with emphasis on the study of extragalactic objects at the lowest possible energies, and a second array in the Southern Hemisphere, in the Atacama Desert in Chile, which is to cover the full energy range and concentrate on galactic sources. The physics program of the CTAO goes beyond high-energy astrophysics into cosmology and fundamental physics.

Building on the technology of current-generation ground-based gamma-ray detectors (MAGIC, HESS, and VERITAS), the CTAO will be ten times more sensitive and have unprecedented accuracy in its detection of high-energy gamma rays. Current gamma-ray telescope arrays host up to five individual telescopes, but the CTAO is designed to detect gamma rays over a larger area and a wider range of views, with more than 60 telescopes located in the northern and southern hemispheres.

In January 2025, the CTAO was established as a European Research Infrastructure Consortium (ERIC) by the European Commission.

The project is part of the Aspera European Astroparticle network and of Astronet.

== Instruments ==
The CTAO will initially use telescopes of three different types and sizes. Medium-Sized Telescopes (MSTs) use reflectors with a diameter of 11.5 meters. They cover the mid-energy range of the observation spectrum, where most events are expected to occur. Large-Sized Telescopes (LSTs) use reflectors with a diameter of 23 meters to detect events in the low-energy range of the observation spectrum. Only four LSTs are planned. Small-Sized Telescopes (SSTs) use a primary reflector of 4.3 meters to detect events in the high-energy range of the observation spectrum. Dozens of these will be spread out over a surface of several square kilometers to increase the chances of detecting these rare events.

== Locations ==
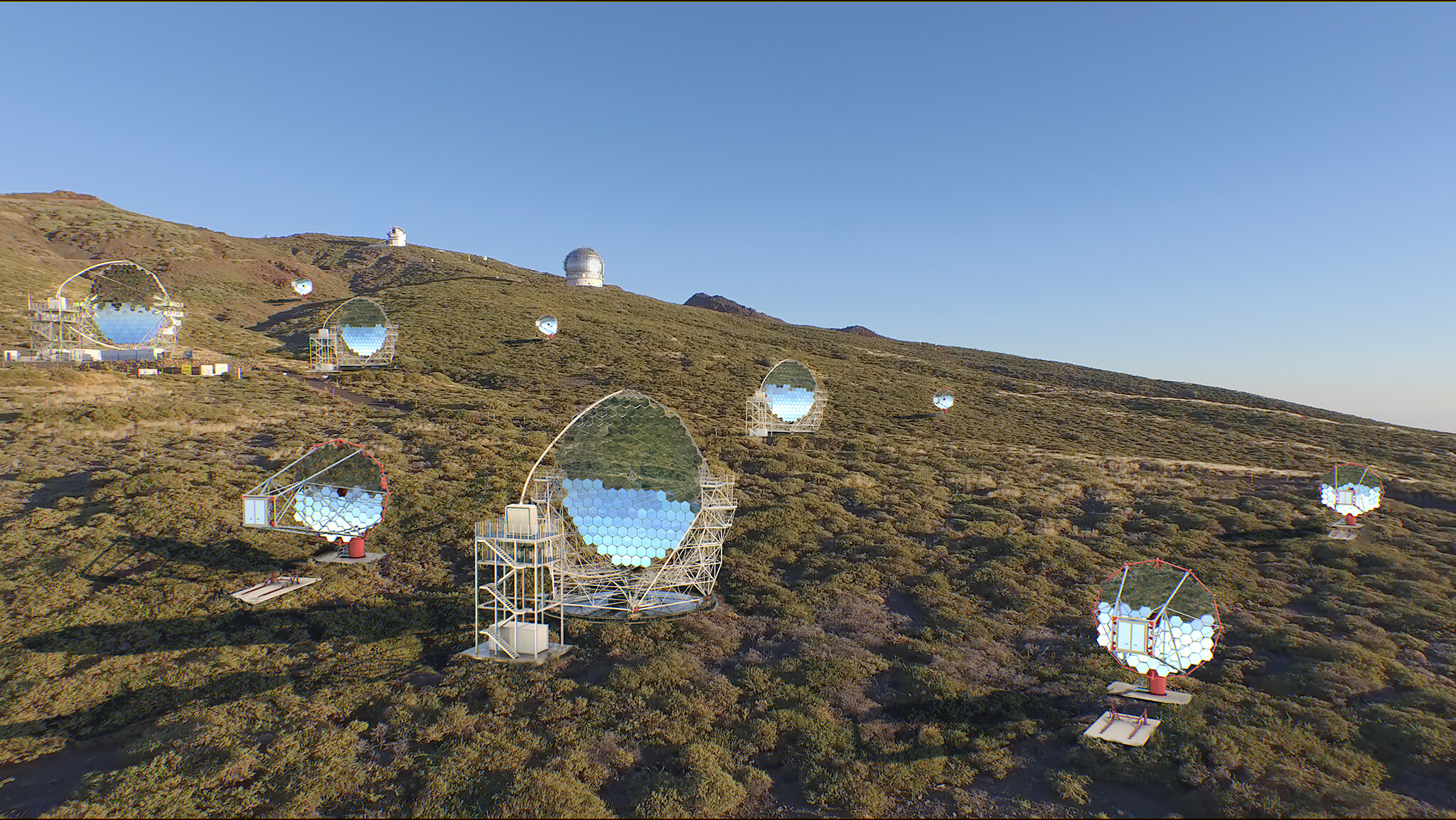
Rendering of the CTAO northern site on La Palma, Canary Islands

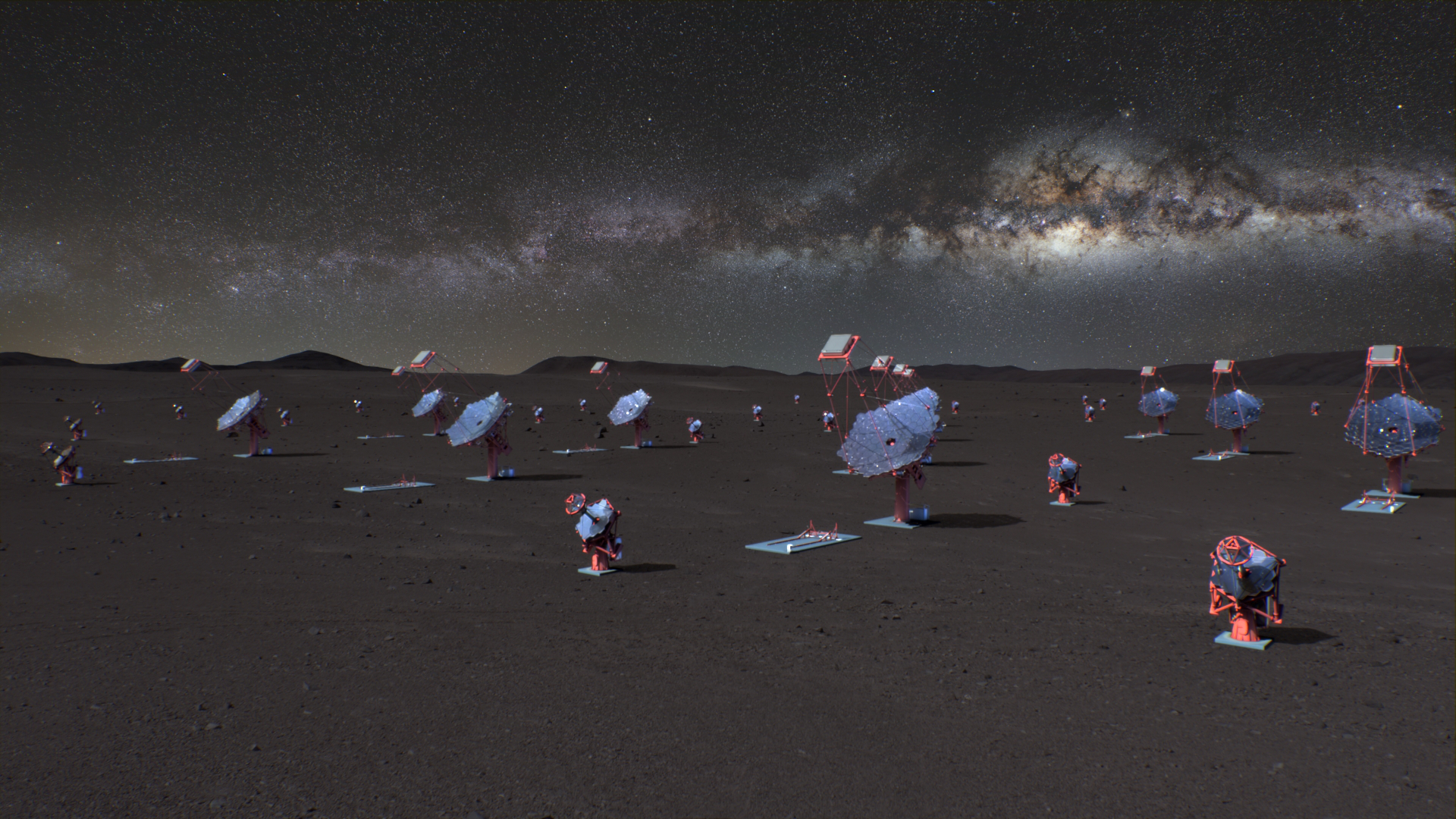
Rendering of the CTAO southern site in Chile

The CTAO headquarters is hosted by Italy's National Institute for Astrophysics, and the Science Data Management Centre is hosted by the Deutsches Elektronen-Synchrotron in Zeuthen, Germany.

The CTAO's northern-hemisphere site, CTAO-North, is located on the existing site of the Instituto de Astrofísica de Canarias' Roque de los Muchachos Observatory, on the island of La Palma, the fifth largest of the Canary Islands. At 2,200 metres of altitude and nestled on a plateau below the rim of an extinct volcanic crater, the site hosts a prototype of the LST, the LST-1, as well as LST-2, LST-3, and LST-4, which were inaugurated in October 2026, with commissioning work to be done in the following years. The site will also host MSTs.

The CTAO's southern-hemisphere site, CTAO-South, is located less than 10 km southeast of the ESO's Paranal Observatory, in the Atacama Desert of Chile. The site will host MSTs and SSTs.

== Science ==
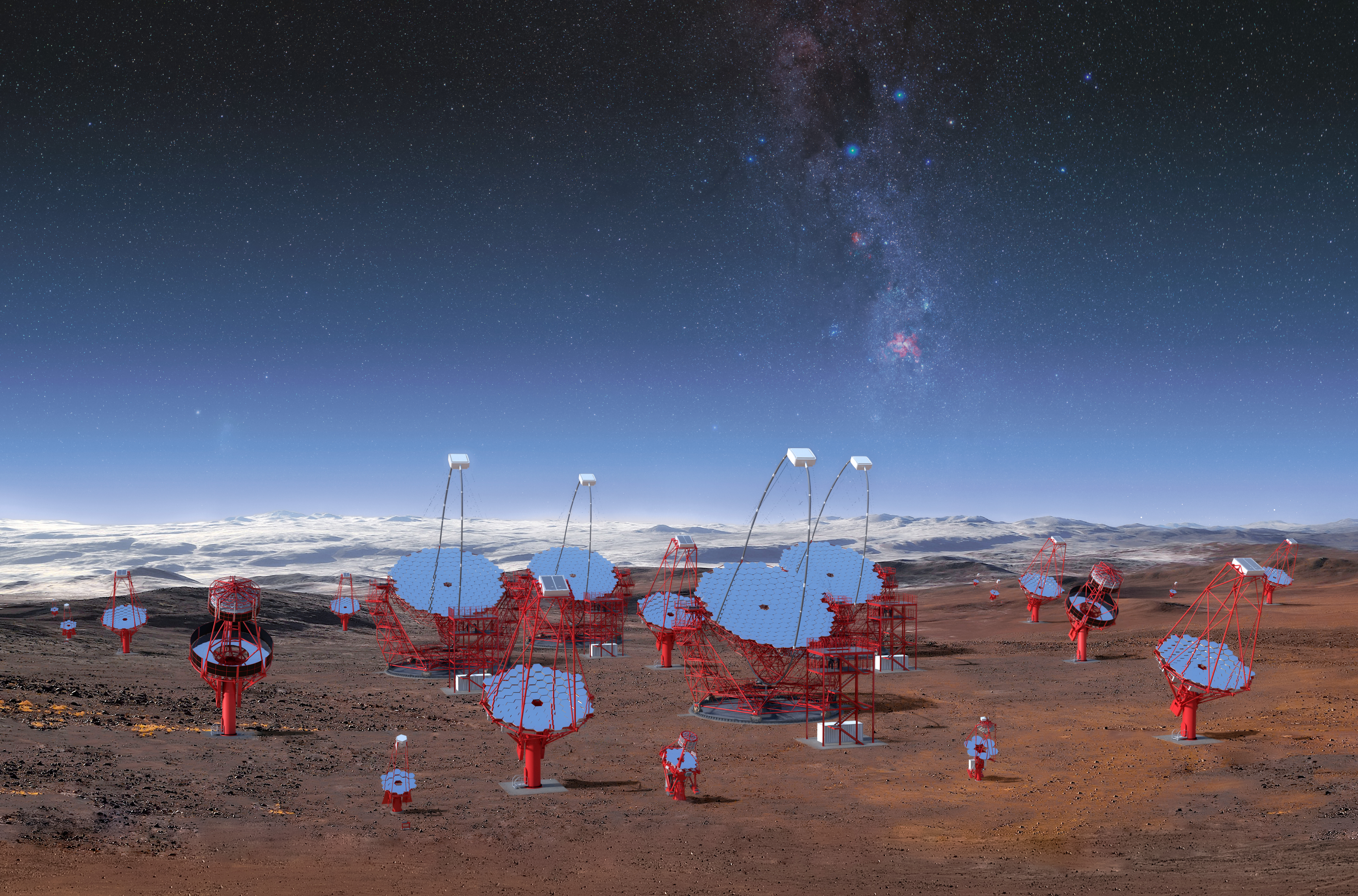
Illustration of all three classes of telescopes planned, Paranal Observatory, Atacama Desert.

The CTAO will observe photons with energies higher than any previously measured. Cosmic particle accelerators can reach energies inaccessible to human-made accelerators such as the Large Hadron Collider. The CTAO will seek to understand the impact of high-energy particles on the evolution of cosmic systems and to gain insight into the most extreme and unusual phenomena in the universe. It will also search for signatures of the annihilation of dark matter particles and for deviations from Einstein's theory of special relativity, as well as conducting a census of particle acceleration in the universe.

Research at the CTAO will seek to address questions in and beyond astrophysics. The CTAO's observations will include the following key targets: Galactic Center, Large Magellanic Cloud, Galactic Plane, galaxy clusters, cosmic ray PeVatrons, star-forming systems, active galactic nuclei, and transient phenomena.

== Possible increase of light pollution ==
There was a planned INNA megaproject by AES Andes, which would have installed 1,000 light sources just five km from the southern part of the CTAO, which had threatened to increase light pollution at the location by 55%. However, it was announced to have been cancelled on 23 January 2026.

== See also ==
- Cherenkov radiation
- List of telescope types
- Major Atmospheric Cerenkov Experiment Telescope
- Pavel Cherenkov
- Segmented mirror
