= Eureka Mountain (Colorado) =

Mountain in the state of Colorado

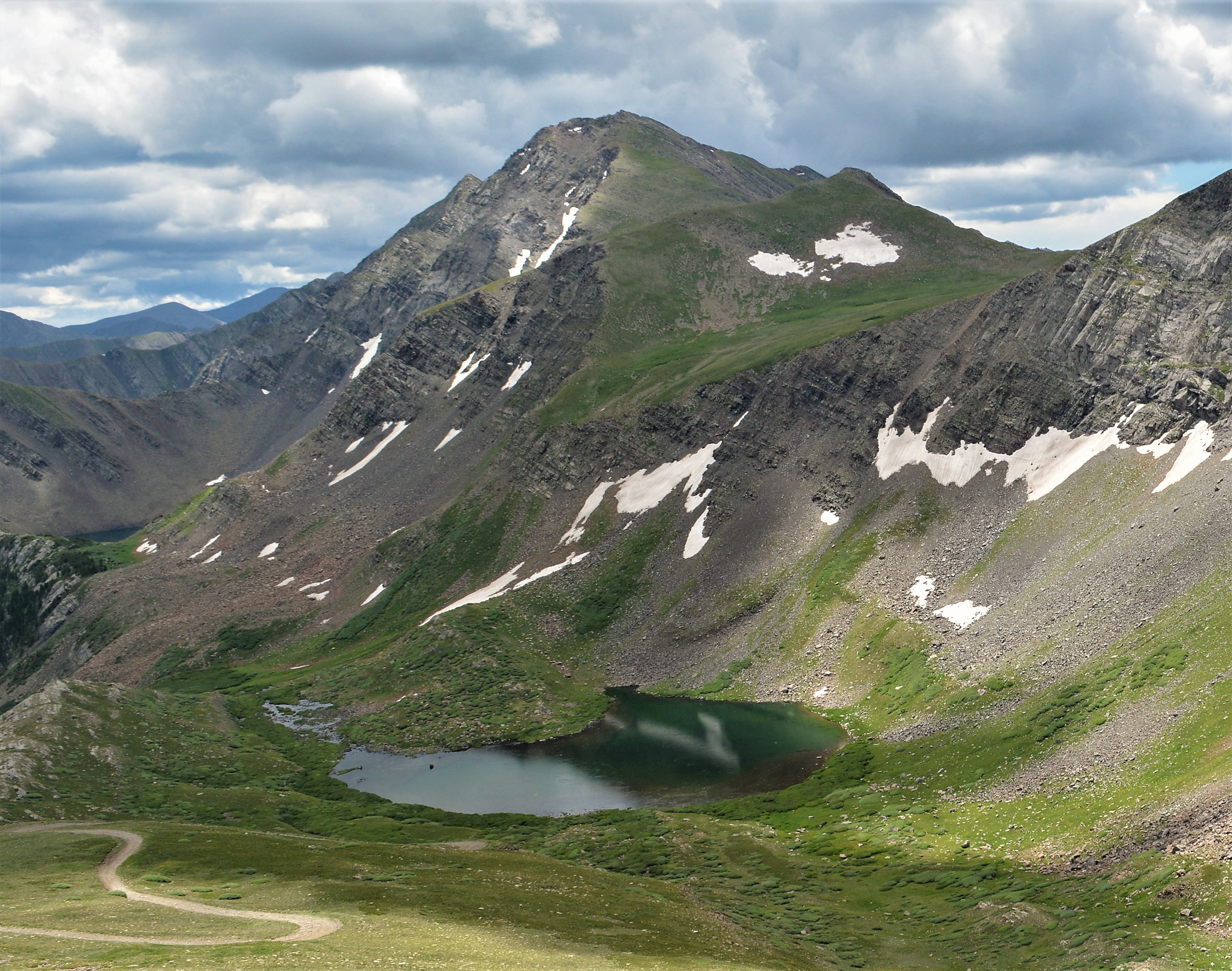
- North aspect, with Horseshoe Lake

Highest point
- Elevation: 13,507 ft (4,117 m)
- Prominence: 819 ft (250 m)
- Parent peak: Rito Alto Peak (13,803 ft)
- Isolation: 1.98 mi (3.19 km)
- Coordinates: 38°04′44″N 105°38′27″W

Geography
- Location within Colorado Location within the United States
- Country: United States
- State: Colorado
- County: Custer / Saguache
- Protected area: Sangre de Cristo Wilderness
- Parent range: Rocky Mountains; Sangre de Cristo Range
- Topo map: USGS Rito Alto Peak

Geology
- Mountain type: Fault block

Climbing
- Easiest route: class 2+

Eureka Mountain is a 13,507-foot (4,117 m) mountain summit on the boundary shared by Custer and Saguache counties, in Colorado, United States.

== Description ==
Eureka Mountain is set on the crest of the Sangre de Cristo Range which is a subrange of the Rocky Mountains. It is the 12th-highest summit in Custer County, and the 255th-highest in Colorado. The mountain is located 10 miles (16 km) west-southwest of the town of Westcliffe in the Sangre de Cristo Wilderness, on land managed by San Isabel National Forest and Rio Grande National Forest. Precipitation runoff from the mountain's eastern slopes drains into tributaries of Grape Creek, which in turn is a tributary of the Arkansas River; the west slope drains into San Isabel Creek and the south slope drains into North Fork Crestone Creek which both flow to the San Luis Valley. Topographic relief is significant as the summit rises 1,577 feet (481 m) above Eureka Lake in 0.4 mile (0.64 km). An ascent of the summit involves 4.5 miles of hiking with 2,290 feet of elevation gain from Horseshoe Lake. The mountain's toponym has been officially adopted by the United States Board on Geographic Names. The name refers to the word "Eureka", an interjection proclaimed by a prospector who made a lucky discovery at the base of the mountain.

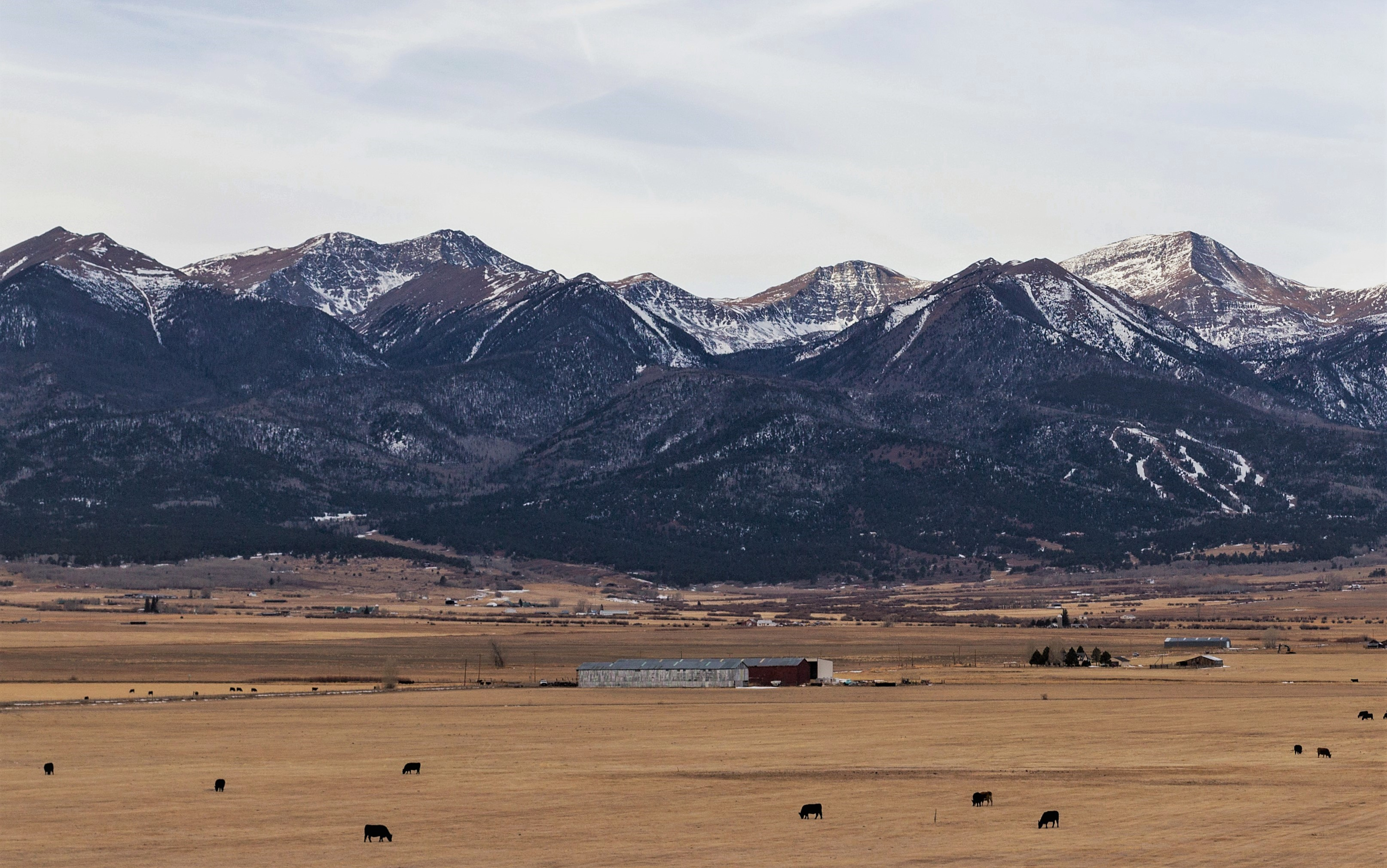
Eureka Mountain (left of center) and Rito Alto Peak (right) viewed from the east near Westcliffe

== Climate ==
According to the Köppen climate classification system, Eureka Mountain is located in an alpine subarctic climate zone with cold, snowy winters, and cool to warm summers. Due to its altitude, it receives precipitation all year, as snow in winter and as thunderstorms in summer, with a dry period in late spring. Climbers can expect afternoon rain, hail, and lightning from the seasonal monsoon in late July and August.

== See also ==
- Sangre de Cristo Mountains
- Thirteener
