= M. B. W. Tent =

American mathematics educator and writer

Margaret Bunting Wyman Tent
- Born: Margaret Bunting Wyman; November 2, 1944; Westfield, Massachusetts
- Died: September 20, 2014 (aged 69); Mount Airy, Maryland
- Education: University of Alabama, Birmingham
- Occupations: Writer, educator
- Writing career
- Pen name: M. B. W. Tent
- Genres: Biography and children's literature
- Subjects: History of mathematics and mathematicians
- Notable works: The Prince of Mathematics: Carl Friedrich Gauss; Emmy Noether: The Mother of Modern Algebra; Gottfried Wilhelm Leibniz: The Polymath Who Brought Us Calculus; Leonhard Euler and the Bernoullis: Mathematicians from Basel

Margaret Bunting Wyman Tent (born Margaret Bunting Wyman; November 2, 1944 – September 20, 2014), also known by her pen name M. B. W. Tent, was an American mathematics educator and writer. She was the author of several bestselling books.

== Life ==
Tent was born in Westfield, Massachusetts and grew up in Amherst, Massachusetts. She worked as a teacher at Altamont high school in Birmingham, Alabama beginning in 1985. In 2010, she and her husband moved to Frederick, Maryland to retire from teaching and continue writing.

On September 20, 2014 she died of breast cancer at a hospice in Mount Airy, Maryland at age 69.

== Career ==
Tent attended Amherst Regional High School and is a graduate of Mount Holyoke College. She received her bachelor's and master's degree from the University of Alabama, Birmingham.

Before teaching post-secondary education, she taught adult education at business colleges and for two years for the American Military in Berlin, Germany.

== Critical reception ==
Most of her books have received good reviews from organizations such as the Mathematical Association of America, and the Association for Computing Machinery.

Her books have received hundreds of citations in the academic press.

Her books have also received praise from other authors and mathematicians like William Dunham, Peter Lax, Cathleen Synge Morawetz, Charles Ashbacher and Peter M. Neumann.

== Bibliography ==
Some of her best known works are:

- The Prince of Mathematics: Carl Friedrich Gauss
- Emmy Noether: The Mother of Modern Algebra
- Gottfried Wilhelm Leibniz: The Polymath Who Brought Us Calculus
- Leonhard Euler and the Bernoullis: Mathematicians from Basel
