= Aspera European Astroparticle network =

Pan-European network of government agencies coordinating astroparticle physics research

ASPERA (or AStroParticle European Research Area) is a network of national government agencies responsible for coordinating and funding national research efforts in astroparticle physics.

== Members ==
ASPERA comprises the following agencies: FNRS (Belgium), FWO (Belgium), MEYS (Czech Republic), CEA (France), CNRS (France), BMBF (Germany), PTDESY (Germany), DEMOKRITOS (Greece), INFN (Italy), FOM (Netherlands), FCT (Portugal), FECYT (Spain), MEC (Spain), SNF (Switzerland), VR (Sweden), STFC (United Kingdom) and the European organization CERN.

== History ==
ASPERA started in July 2006 and is funded by the European Commission over a three-year period.

ASPERA has come about through the existence of ApPEC (Astroparticle Physics European Coordination/Consortium) which was founded in 2001 when six European scientific agencies took the initiative to coordinate and encourage astroparticle physics in Europe.

== Roadmap ==
One of the most important achievements of ASPERA was to produce a common European Roadmap for the future, in the field of astroparticle physics.

Published in September 2008 in Brussels, the Roadmap presents the "Magnificent Seven", which are the Seven large infrastructures expected in the next 10 years to answer some of the most exciting questions about the Universe such as: What is dark matter? What is the origin of cosmic rays? What is the role of violent cosmic processes? Can we detect gravitational waves?

- CTA, The Cherenkov Telescope Array, a large array of Cherenkov Telescopes for detection of cosmic high-energy gamma rays
- KM3NeT, a cubic kilometre-scale neutrino telescope in the Mediterranean Sea
- Ton-scale detectors for dark matter searches, such as EURECA
- A ton-scale detector for the determination of the fundamental nature and mass of neutrinos
- A Megaton-scale detector for proton decay’s search, neutrino astrophysics & investigation of neutrino properties
- A large array for the detection of charged cosmic rays
- A third-generation underground gravitational antenna
