= Emmy Noether: The Mother of Modern Algebra =

2008 semifictional book by M. B. W. Tent

- Author: M. B. W. Tent
- Language: English
- Subject: Life of Emmy Noether
- Publisher: A. K. Peters
- Publication date: 2008
- Pages: 177
- ISBN: 978-1-56881-430-8

Emmy Noether: The Mother of Modern Algebra is a 2008 semifictional book by M. B. W. Tent, covering the life of German mathematician Emmy Noether. Organized into five chapters, the book received mixed reviews and contained several historical inaccuracies.

== Summary ==
=== Cover image ===
The cover image for the book is an elderly woman in drab-colored clothing standing next to a bench. Charles Aschbacher wrote that this image was unlikely to be even of Noether herself, but Renate Tobies dates it to 1933 and describes it as a colorized photo of Noether at Göttingen station.

=== Content ===
The book is divided into five chapters:

1. Childhood
2. Studying at the University
3. The Young Scholar
4. Emmy Noether at Her Prime Time in Göttingen
5. Exile

Each of those chapters is further divided into sub-chapters.

The book begins with Noether's early life, and the influence of her father Max Noether, then a professor at the University of Erlangen, and Max Noether's colleague Paul Gordan (here spelled "Paul Gordon"). It also covers the main character's education at a girl's school and the University of Erlangen. Finally, it covers Noether's career at the University of Göttingen, and her exile (due to the rise of the Nazis) to the United States at Bryn Mawr College, where she stayed for the rest of her life.

== Reception ==
Roy Berglund, of the Borough of Manhattan Community College, called it an "enjoyable book and quite readable by non-mathematicians". Charles Aschbacher, editor of the Journal of Recreational Mathematics, also praised the book, writing that "[n]one of [the dialogue] is beyond the bounds of plausible conversation".

Benno Artmann, of the Mathematisches Institut of the University of Göttingen, wrote that "one cannot expect any specific information" about Noether's research, and concluded with the remark "Well, let us stamp our feet at the end of the book!"

Martin Griffiths wrote that, although the book does give the reader an impression of Noether's eccentric yet generous personality, some parts feel like "a play with a rather simplistic and unimaginative script". The review writer also speculated, based on a comment in the acknowledgements section, that Tent might have written the book primarily for teenage girls. Renate Tobies, writing for the The Mathematical Intelligencer, also expressed her disappointment upon reading the book, even though she had agreed to review it enthusiastically. Tobies pointed out that the portrayal of Noether's family in the book is anachronistic, and that the book indicates that Tent seemingly did not understand Cordula Tollmien's research (despite Tent acknowledging it herself), nor how higher education in Germany works.
