= Eureka, West Virginia =

Unincorporated community in West Virginia, United States

- Unincorporated community
- Location within West Virginia Location within the United States
- Coordinates: 39°22′21″N 81°16′51″W
- Country: United States
- State: West Virginia
- County: Pleasants
- Elevation: 636 ft (194 m)
- Time zone: UTC-5 (Eastern (EST))
  - Summer (DST): UTC-4 (EDT)
- Area codes: 304 & 681
- GNIS feature ID: 1551067

Eureka is an unincorporated community in Pleasants County, West Virginia, United States. Eureka is located on the banks of the Ohio River and West Virginia Route 2, 1 mile (1.6 km) west-southwest of Belmont. Eureka had a post office, which closed on January 16, 1993.

The community was named Eureka after oil was discovered in the area.
