= New York Number Theory Seminar =

Research seminar in mathematics in New York City

The New York Number Theory Seminar is a research seminar devoted to theory of numbers and related parts of mathematics and physics.

The seminar began in 1982 under the founding organizers Harvey Cohn, David and Gregory Chudnovsky, and Melvyn B. Nathanson. It currently alternates between being held at the CUNY Graduate Center, NYU Courant Institute, and Columbia University.

== Overview ==
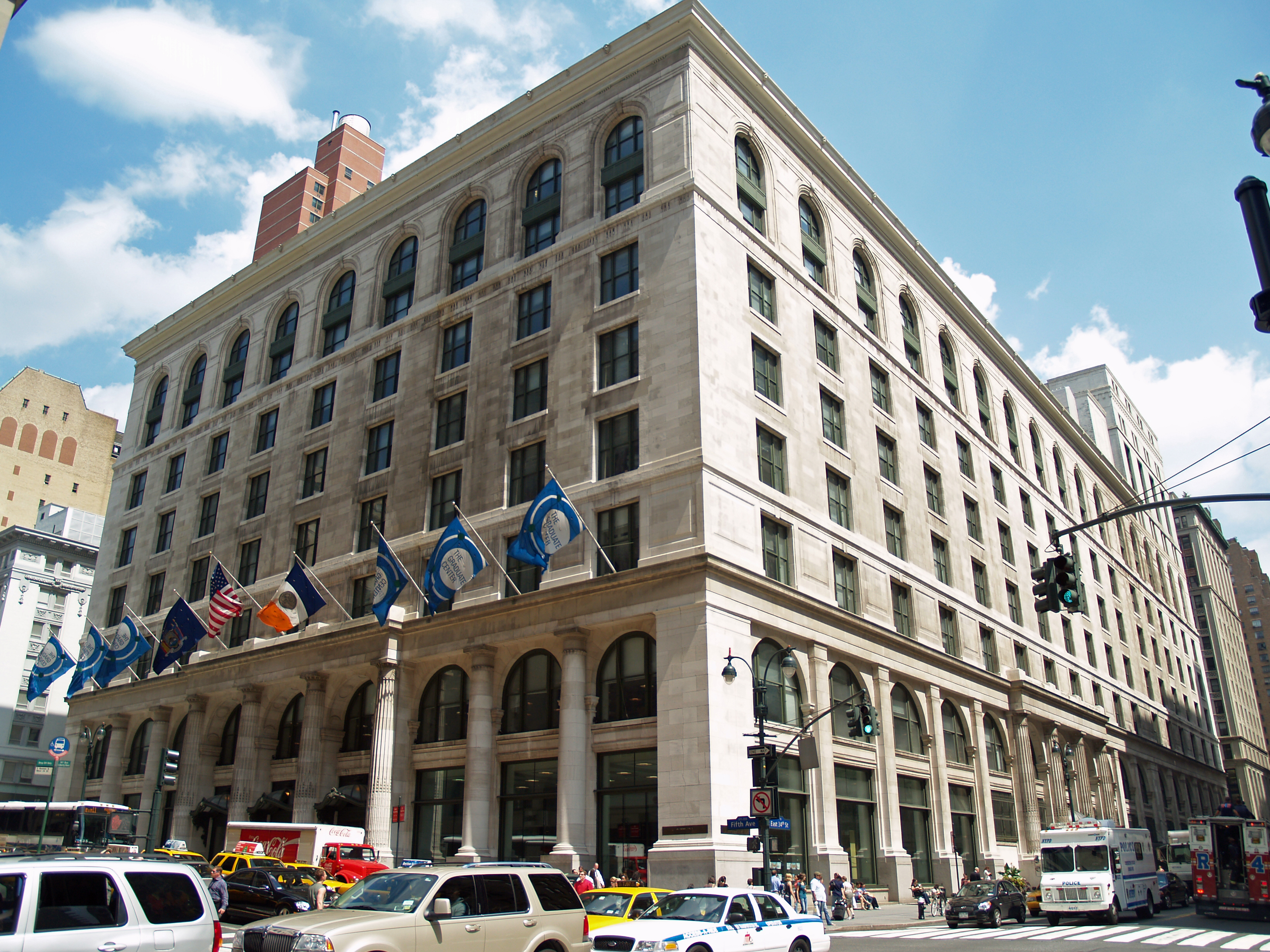
The Graduate Center, where the New York Number Theory seminars take place, is located in the former B. Altman and Company Building at 365 Fifth Avenue.

The New York Number Theory Seminar began in January 1982 and was originally organized by number theorists Harvey Cohn, David and Gregory Chudnovsky, and Melvyn B. Nathanson. Since the retirement of Cohn, Nathanson is the sole organizer. The seminar also organizes an annual Workshop on Combinatorial and Additive Number Theory (CANT) at the Graduate Center, CUNY.

== Publications ==
Four volumes of the collected lecture notes of the seminar were published in the Lecture Notes in Mathematics series by Springer-Verlag. These volumes covered the seminar from 1982 to 1988. Three additional stand-alone books were published by Springer-Verlag under the title Number Theory, covering the seminar between 1989 and 2003.
