= Modane Underground Laboratory =

Particle physics laboratory in France

Coordinates: 45.1785471°N 6.6890208°E

The Modane Underground Laboratory (LSM) (French: Laboratoire Souterrain de Modane; also known as the Fréjus Underground Laboratory) is a subterranean particle physics laboratory located within the Fréjus Road Tunnel near Modane, France. It is jointly operated by the French National Center for Scientific Research and the Atomic Energy and Alternative Energies Commission in partnership with the University of Savoie.

== Size ==
The laboratory sits almost exactly in the middle of the 12.6-kilometer (7.8 mi) Fréjus Road Tunnel, which links Modane to Bardonecchia, Italy, 1,700 meters (5,600 ft) below Fréjus Peak. This depth translates to a meter water equivalent depth of 4,800 meters (15,700 ft). As of 2012, it is the deepest laboratory in the European Union.

== History ==
The LSM was built between 1981 and 1982 to host the "Fréjus" iron tracking calorimeter proton decay experiment. Today the site houses the Neutrino Ettore Majorana Observatory (NEMO) search for neutrinoless double beta decay, the EDELWEISS dark matter detector, and other particle detectors.
