= Eureka, Crockett County, Texas =

Eureka is a ghost town in Crockett County, Texas, United States. It was originally established as Couch Well, and in 1891 was one of the towns vying to become the county seat in the county's first election. Two cowboys who rode into San Angelo reported to the San Angelo Standard that Ozona had defeated Eureka in this election.
