= Gauss's diary =

Diary of Carl F. Gauss's mathematical discoveries

Gauss's diary was a record of the mathematical discoveries of German mathematician Carl Friedrich Gauss from 1796 to 1814. It was rediscovered in 1897 and published by Klein (1903), and reprinted in volume X_{1} of his collected works and in (Gauss 2005). There is an English translation with commentary given by Gray (1984), reprinted in the second edition of (Dunnington 2004).

== Sample entries ==
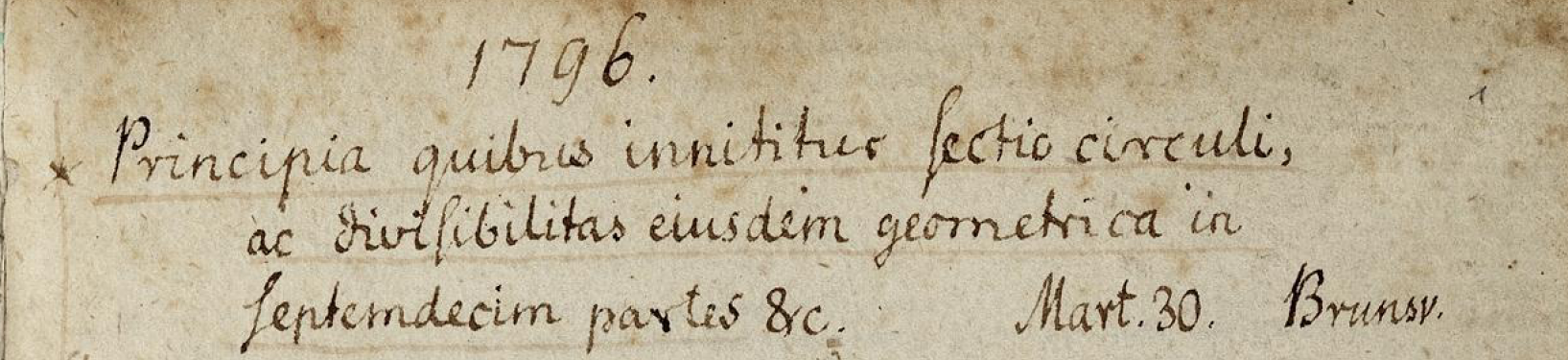
Gauss's first diary entry related to the regular 17-gon (1796)

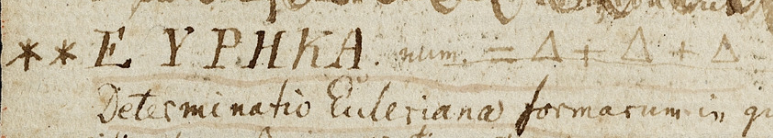
Gauss's diary entry related to sum of triangular numbers (1796)

Most of the entries consist of a brief and sometimes cryptic statement of a result in Latin.

Entry 1, dated 1796, March 30, states "Principia quibus innititur sectio circuli, ac divisibilitas eiusdem geometrica in septemdecim partes etc.", which records Gauss's discovery of the construction of a heptadecagon by ruler and compass.

Entry 18, dated 1796, July 10, states "ΕΥΡΗΚΑ! num = Δ + Δ + Δ" and records his discovery of a proof that any number is the sum of 3 triangular numbers, a special case of the Fermat polygonal number theorem.

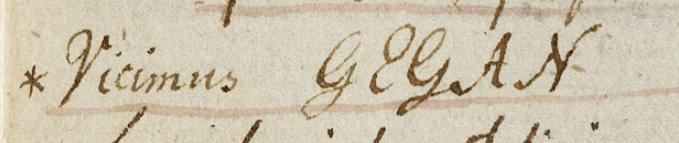
Gauss's diary entry, Vicimus GEGAN

Entry 43, dated 1796, October 21, states "Vicimus GEGAN" (We have conquered GEGAN). The meaning of this was a mystery for many years. Biermann (1997) found a manuscript by Gauss suggesting that GEGAN is a reversal of the acronym NAGEG standing for Nexum medii Arithmetico-Geometricum Expectationibus Generalibus and refers to the connection between the arithmetic-geometric mean and elliptic functions.

Entry 146, dated 1814 July 9, is the last entry, and records an observation relating biquadratic residues and the lemniscate functions, later proved by Gauss and by Chowla (1940). More precisely, Gauss observed that if a+bi is a (Gaussian) prime and a–1+bi is divisible by 2+2i, then the number of solutions to the congruence 1=xx+yy+xxyy (mod a+bi), including x=∞, y=±i and x=±i, y=∞, is (a–1)^{2}+b^{2}.
