= Melvyn B. Nathanson =

American mathematician

Melvyn Bernard Nathanson
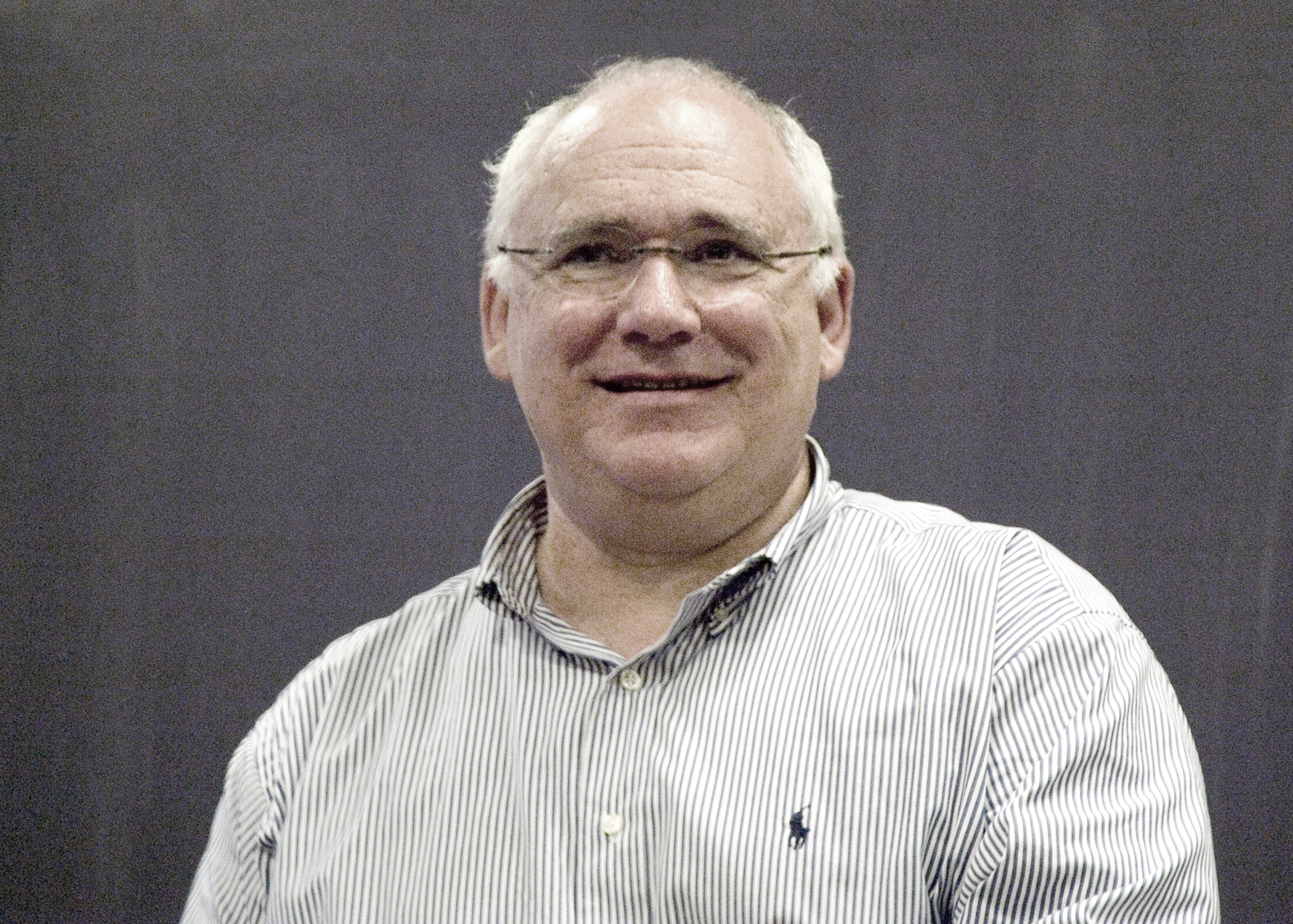
- Born: October 10, 1944 (age 81); Philadelphia, Pennsylvania
- Education: University of Pennsylvania; University of Rochester
- Known for: Additive number theory
- Awards: Fellow of the American Mathematical Society
- Scientific career
- Fields: Mathematics
- Workplaces: Lehman College and CUNY Graduate Center
- Thesis: Difference Operators on Sequences Over Groups (1972)
- Doctoral advisor: Sanford L. Segal

Melvyn Bernard Nathanson (born October 10, 1944, in Philadelphia, Pennsylvania) is an American mathematician, specializing in number theory, and a Professor of Mathematics at Lehman College and the Graduate Center of the City University of New York). His principal work is in additive and combinatorial number theory. He is the author of over 200 research papers in mathematics, and author or editor of 27 books.

== Education ==
Nathanson graduated from Central High School in 1961 and from the University of Pennsylvania in 1965 with a Bachelor of Arts in philosophy. He was a graduate student in biophysics at Harvard University in 1965–66, then moved to the University of Rochester, where he received a PhD in mathematics in 1972. During the academic year 1969–70 he was a visiting research student in the Department of Pure Mathematics and Mathematical Statistics at the University of Cambridge.

== Professional life ==
Nathanson was on the faculty of Southern Illinois University, Carbondale from 1971 to 1981. He was Professor of Mathematics and Dean of the Graduate School of Rutgers-Newark from 1981 to 1986, and Provost and Vice President of Academic Affairs at Lehman College at the City University of New York from 1986 to 1991. He has been Professor of Mathematics at Lehman College and the Graduate Center of the City University of New York since 1986. He held visiting positions at Harvard University in 1977–78, Rockefeller University in 1981–83, Tel Aviv University in Spring, 2001, and Princeton University in Fall, 2008.

In 1974–75 Nathanson was Assistant to André Weil in the School of Mathematics of the Institute for Advanced Study. Nathanson subsequently spent the academic years 1990–91 and 1999–2000, and the Fall, 2007, term at the Institute. He served as President of the Association of Members of the Institute for Advanced Study (AMIAS) from 1998 to 2012.

In 1972–73 Nathanson became the first American mathematician to receive an International Research & Exchanges Board fellowship to spend a year in the former USSR, where he worked with I. M. Gel'fand at Moscow State University. In 1977 the National Academy of Sciences selected him to spend another year in Moscow on its exchange agreement with the USSR Academy of Sciences. An international brouhaha ensued when the Soviet government refused to allow him to re-enter the country. He spent the academic year 1977–78 in the mathematics department at Harvard University, where he also worked in the Program for Science and International Affairs, and contributed to the book Nuclear Nonproliferation: The Spent Fuel Problem. Nathanson is the author/editor/translator of several books and articles on Soviet art and politics, including Komar/Melamid: Two Soviet Dissident Artists, and Grigori Freiman, It Seems I am a Jew: A Samizdat Essay on Anti-Semitism in Soviet Mathematics, both published by Southern Illinois University Press.

Nathanson was a frequent collaborator with Paul Erdős, with whom he wrote 19 papers in number theory. He also organizes the Workshop on Combinatorial and Additive Number Theory, which has been held annually at the Graduate Center, CUNY since 2003. Nathanson's essays on political and social issues related to science have appeared in The New York Times, The Bulletin of the Atomic Scientists, The Mathematical Intelligencer, Notices of the American Mathematical Society, and other publications.

He was elected to the 2018 class of fellows of the American Mathematical Society.

== Personal life ==
Nathanson is married to Marjorie Frankel Nathanson, Director Emerita of the Hunterdon Art Museum in Clinton, New Jersey.

== Selected publications ==
=== Books ===
- Nathanson, Melvyn B. (1996). Additive Number Theory The Classical Bases. Graduate Texts in Mathematics. Vol. 164 (1st ed.). Springer-Verlag. ISBN 978-0-387-94656-6.
- Nathanson, Melvyn B. (1996). Additive Number Theory: Inverse Problems and the Geometry of Sumsets. Graduate Texts in Mathematics. Vol. 165 (1st ed.). Springer-Verlag. ISBN 978-0-387-94655-9.
- Nathanson, Melvyn B. (2000). Elementary Methods in Number Theory. Graduate Texts in Mathematics. Vol. 195 (1st ed.). Springer-Verlag. ISBN 978-0-387-98912-9.

=== Papers ===
Nathanson's recent mathematical work is available on the arXiv. Some of his most significant works include:

- Pitici, Mircea, ed. (2011). "Desperately Seeking Mathematical Proof". The Best Writing on Mathematics 2010. Princeton University Press. ISBN 978-0-691-14841-0.
- Pitici, Mircea, ed. (2012). "One, Two, Many: Individuality and Collectivity in Mathematics". The Best Writing on Mathematics 2011. Princeton University Press. ISBN 978-0-691-15315-5. JSTOR j.ctt7pgb6.
- Pitici, Mircea, ed. (2020). "The Erdős Paradox". The Best Writing on Mathematics 2019. Princeton University Press. ISBN 978-0-691-19867-5. JSTOR j.ctvggx33b.

== See also ==
- New York Number Theory Seminar
