= Institut de recherche sur les lois fondamentales de l'Univers =

French physics research institute

- Parent institution: Direction de la recherche fondamentale, CEA
- Established: 1991
- Mission: Fundamental research
- Focus: Astrophysics, nuclear physics, particle physics
- Location: Gif-sur-Yvette, France
- Coordinates: 48.698327°N 2.100268°E
- Interactive map of Institut de recherche sur les lois fondamentales de l'Univers
- Website: https://irfu.cea.fr

The Institute of research into the fundamental laws of the Universe (French: Institut de recherche sur les lois fondamentales de l'Univers), abbreviated as IRFU or CEA Irfu and formerly called Dapnia, is a research establishment in astrophysics, nuclear physics, particle physics and associated technical expertise. It is part of the Atomic Energy and Alternative Energies Commission (CEA) in Saclay and employs nearly 1,000 people and supervises around a hundred doctoral students. It is attached to the Department of Fundamental Research (DRF) of the CEA.

Irfu physicists, engineers and technicians work in particular to understand the world from the infinitely small through the study of the standard model of particle physics to that of the infinitely large such as the structuring of the Universe via experimental observations coupled with large-scale simulations.

== History ==
IRFU emerged from the restructuring in 2008 of the Département d’astrophysique, de physique des particules, de physique nucléaire et d’instrumentation associée (Dapnia). Dapnia is a former fundamental physics research establishment of the Atomic Energy Commission created in 1991 by Robert Aymar, then director of Material Sciences (DSM) at CEA.

In 1992, the publication of the journal ScintillationS began, in which members of Dapnia present news of their activities.

In 2004, Dapnia employed 660 people, including the famous physicist Hubert Reeves.

In 2013, IRFU participated in the analysis of the atmosphere of Titan - a satellite of the planet Saturn. Physicists discovered propene there by studying measurements from the Cassini space probe.
