= Eureka, Marion County, Florida =

Eureka, Florida
- Unincorporated community
- Location within Florida Location within the United States
- Coordinates: 29°22′18″N 81°54′39″W
- Country: United States
- State: Florida
- County: Marion
- Elevation: 71 ft (22 m)
- Time zone: UTC-5 (Eastern (EST))
  - Summer (DST): UTC-4 (EDT)
- ZIP code: 32134 (Fort McCoy)
- Area code: 352
- GNIS feature ID: 305642

Eureka is an unincorporated community in Marion County, Florida, United States. The community is located at the junctions of County Road 316, Northeast 148th Terrace Road and Northeast 150th Avenue, 3.5 miles (5.6 km) east of Fort McCoy and 6 miles (10 km) west of Lake Kerr. It is 22 miles (35 km) northeast of Ocala, the Marion county seat. The community sits on a small rise on the west side of the Ocklawaha River.
