= Eureka Pass =

Mountain pass in Nunavut, Canada

- Location within Nunavut

Third Approach
- Location: Nunavut, Canada
- Range: Princess Margaret Range
- Coordinates: 79°36′N 089°51′W
- Topo map: NTS 59H10 Eureka Pass

Eureka Pass is a mountain pass in the southern Princess Margaret Range of central Axel Heiberg Island, Nunavut, Canada.
