= Eureka (French automobile) =

The Eureka was a French automobile manufactured from 1906 until 1909. A single-cylinder voiturette with friction transmission and belt final drive, it was built at Automobiles Mainetty from La Garenne-Colombes, and used either a 6 hp De Dion or a 12 hp Anzani engine.
