= Eureka (word) =

Joyful exclamation at a striking discovery

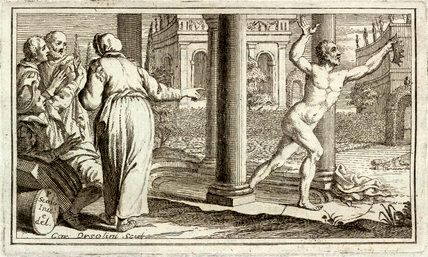
Archimedes exclaiming Eureka. In his excitement, he forgets to dress and runs nude in the streets straight out of his bath. Drawing by Pietro Scalvini, engraving by Carlo Orsolini, 1737.

Eureka (Ancient Greek: εὕρηκα, romanized: héurēka) is an exclamation used to celebrate a discovery or invention. It is a transliteration of an exclamation attributed to Ancient Greek mathematician and inventor Archimedes.

== Etymology ==
Eureka comes from Ancient Greek εὕρηκα (heúrēka) 'I have found (it)', which is the first person singular perfect indicative active of the verb εὑρίσκω heurískō 'I find'. It is closely related to heuristic, which refers to experience-based techniques for problem-solving, learning, and discovery.

== Pronunciation ==
The accent of the English word is on the second syllable, following Latin rules of accent, which require that a penult (next-to-last syllable) must be accented if it contains a long vowel. In the Greek pronunciation, the first syllable has a high pitch accent, because the Ancient Greek rules of accent do not force accent to the penult unless the ultima (last syllable) has a long vowel.

The initial /h/ is dropped in modern Greek and in several other European languages, including Catalan, French, Italian, Spanish, Portuguese, Dutch, and English, but preserved in others, such as Finnish, Danish, and German.

== Archimedes ==
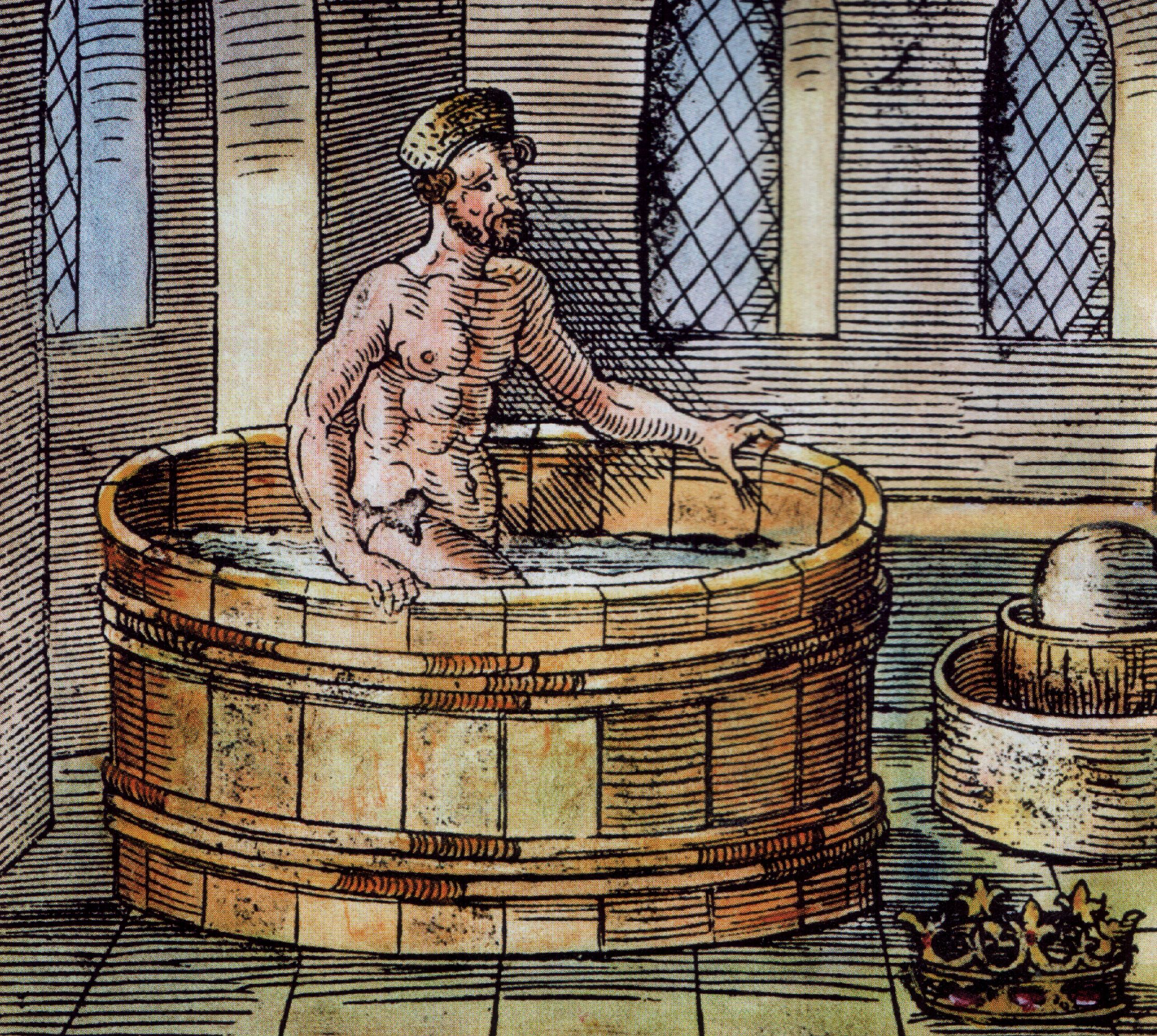
16th-century illustration of Archimedes in the bath, with Hiero's crown at bottom right

The exclamation "Eureka!" is attributed to the ancient Greek scholar Archimedes. He reportedly proclaimed "Eureka! Eureka!" after he had stepped into a bath and noticed that the water level rose, whereupon he suddenly understood that the volume of water displaced must be equal to the volume of the part of his body he had submerged. (This relation is not what is known as Archimedes' principle—that deals with the upthrust experienced by a body immersed in a fluid.) He then realized that the volume of irregular objects could be measured with precision, a previously intractable problem. He is said to have been so eager to share his discovery that he leapt out of his bathtub and ran naked through the streets of Syracuse.

Archimedes' insight led to the solution of a problem posed by Hiero of Syracuse, on how to assess the purity of an irregular golden votive crown; he had given his goldsmith the pure gold to be used, and correctly suspected he had been cheated by the goldsmith removing gold and adding the same weight of silver. Equipment for weighing objects with a fair amount of precision already existed, and now that Archimedes could also measure volume, their ratio would give the object's density, an important indicator of purity (as gold is nearly twice as dense as silver and therefore has significantly greater weight for the same volume).

=== Authenticity ===
This story first appeared in written form in Vitruvius's books of architecture (ca. 20-30 A.D.), two centuries after it supposedly took place. It is told again a century later by Plutarch, though in a shortened version. Both Vitruvius's and Plutarch's accounts suggest that the legend was already well known at the time they were writing. Some scholars have doubted the accuracy of this tale, on the grounds that the votive crown was a fine item, thus an impure crown would displace water only minutely, compared to a pure one. Precise means needed to measure this minute difference were not available at the time. For the problem posed to Archimedes, though, there is a simple method which requires no precision equipment: using a balance, compare the weight of the crown against pure gold. While they are still suspended from the arms of the balance, simultaneously submerge the crown and the gold in water. If the volumes are the same, the balance remains in equilibrium, meaning that their densities are the same and therefore the crown must be pure gold. But if the density of the crown is less (due to being alloyed with another metal like silver), increased buoyancy of the crown results in imbalance. Galileo Galilei himself weighed in on the controversy, suggesting a design for a hydrostatic balance that could be used to compare the dry weight of an object with the weight of the same object submerged in water.

=== Parody ===
Writing in Greek toward the end of the first century A.D., Plutarch imagined a travesty of the story whereby a glutton, after having eaten a delicious meal, would run around shouting "I ate it!" (βέβρωκα, bébroka) and a gallant, after having kissed the woman he desires, would go around shouting "I kissed her!" (πεφίληκα, pephileka). Plutarch says that although many lovers of good food and many lovers of women have existed in the past and in his day, no story of this kind has ever been recorded. He concludes that the pleasures brought about by knowledge are greater and more respectable than the pleasures brought about by food or sensuality. He uses this parody to make a case against Epicureanism, on the grounds that Epicureanism denies to its followers the pleasures of the mind which, as the story of Archimedes shows, are beneficial insofar as they lead us to a love of science.

== Names and mottos ==
=== California ===
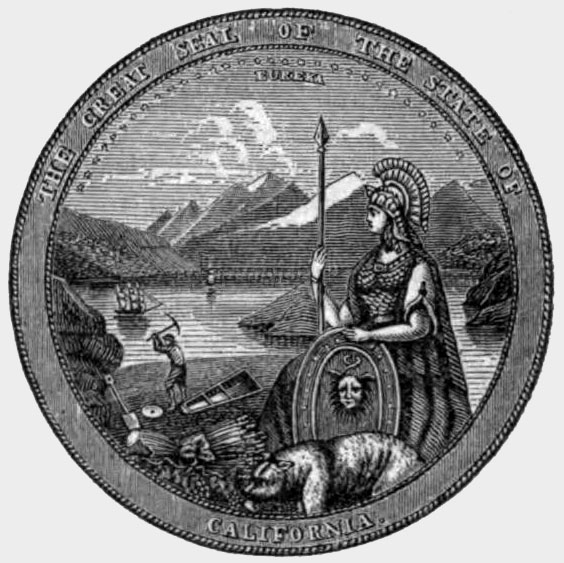
The Seal of California, featuring the word "EUREKA" above the spear of the goddess Minerva.

The expression is also the state motto of California, referring to the momentous discovery of gold near Sutter's Mill in 1848. The California State Seal has included the word Eureka since its original design by Robert S. Garnett in 1850; the official text from that time describing the seal states that this word's meaning applies "either to the principle involved in the admission of the State or the success of the miner at work". In 1957 the state legislature attempted to make "In God We Trust" the state motto as part of the same post WWII anti-Communist movement that successfully added the term "under God" to the American Pledge of Allegiance in 1954, but this attempt did not succeed and "Eureka" was made the official motto in 1963.

The city of Eureka, California, founded in 1850, uses the California State Seal as its official seal. Eureka is a considerable distance from Sutter's Mill, but was the jumping off point of a smaller gold rush in nearby Trinity County, California, in 1850. It is the largest of at least eleven remaining US cities and towns named for the exclamation, "eureka!". As a result of the extensive use of the exclamation dating from 1849, there were nearly 40 locales so named by the 1880s in a nation that had none in the 1840s. Many places, works of culture, and other objects have since been named "Eureka"; see Eureka (disambiguation) for a list.

=== Australia ===
"Eureka" has been associated with Australian nationalism, since an 1854 armed uprising against British colonial rule. In the Colony of Victoria, during the Australian gold rushes, self-employed miners – initially rebelling against unjust mining license fees and a repressive, authoritarian colonial regime – declared the founding of an independent republic. The rebellion, with its headquarters in Ballarat at an encampment known as the Eureka Stockade, has often been referred to as the "birth of democracy" in Australia.

== Mathematics ==
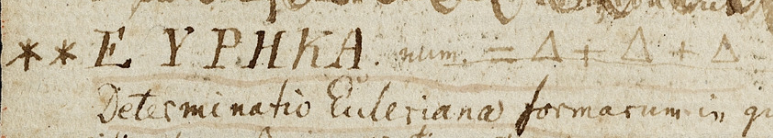
Gauss's diary entry related to sum of triangular numbers (1796)

Another mathematician, Carl Friedrich Gauss, echoed Archimedes when in 1796 he wrote in his diary, "ΕΥΡΗΚΑ! num = Δ + Δ + Δ", referring to his discovery that any positive integer could be expressed as the sum of at most three triangular numbers. This result is now known as Gauss's Eureka theorem and is a special case of what later became known as the Fermat polygonal number theorem.

== See also ==
- Epiphany (feeling) – Positive affect associated with sudden understanding
- Eureka effect – Suddenly understanding a problem or concept
- Heuristic – Problem-solving method
- Serendipity – Unplanned, fortunate discovery
