= Eureka Shipyard =

- Built: 1910s
- Location: Newburgh, New York
- Coordinates: 41.496878°N 74.006043°W
- Industry: Shipbuilding
- Defunct: 1940s

Eureka Shipyard was located on the Hudson River in Newburgh, New York. This shipyard built a number of ships for the United States Navy and Liberty/Cargo ships during World War II. Commercial vessels were also built here.
