= Cryogenic Rare Event Search with Superconducting Thermometers =

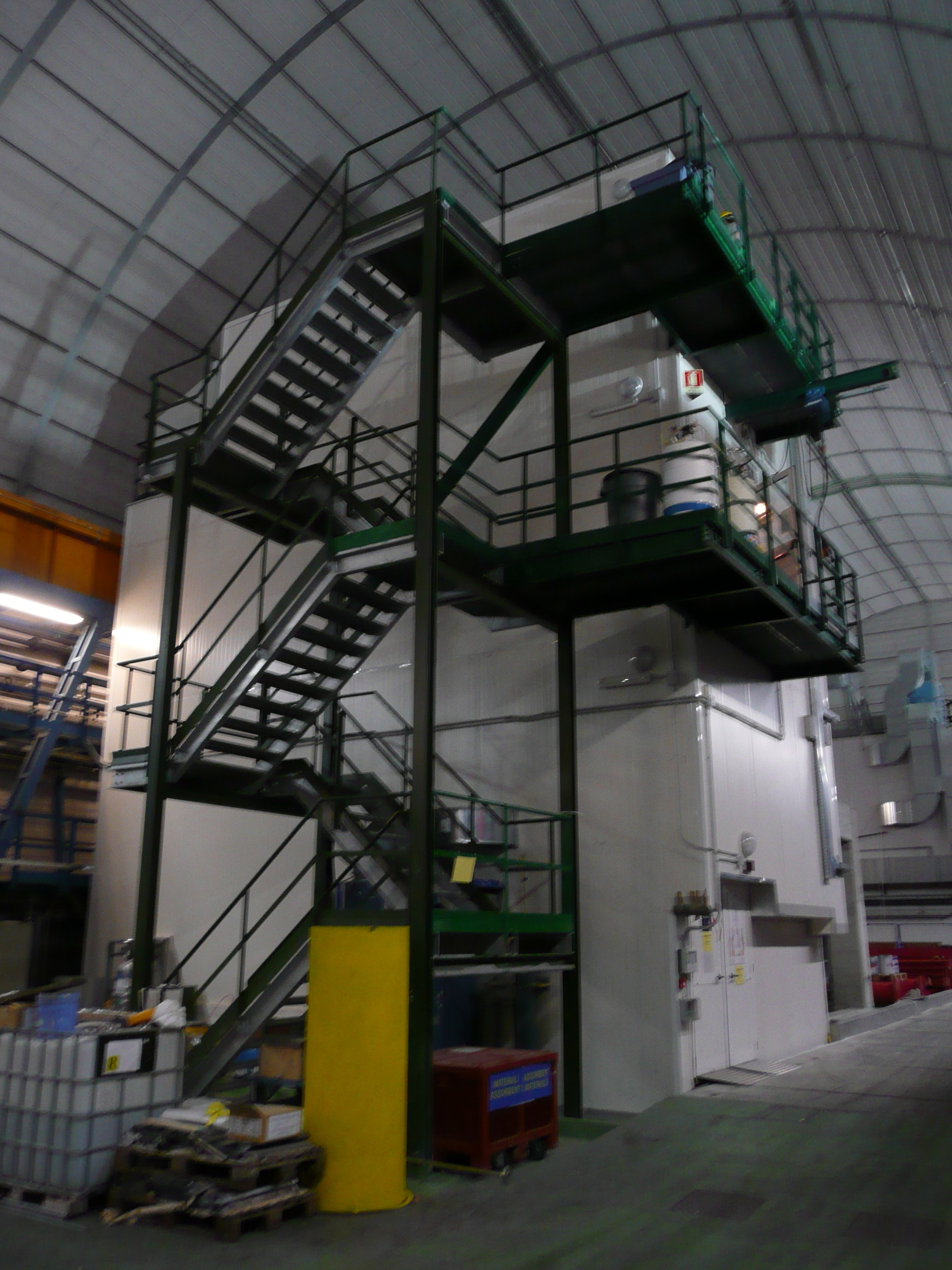
The building housing the CRESST cryostat, located in Hall A of the LNGS deep underground laboratory, Gran Sasso, Italy.

The Cryogenic Rare Event Search with Superconducting Thermometers (CRESST) is a collaboration of European experimental particle physics groups involved in the construction of cryogenic detectors for direct dark matter searches. The participating institutes are the Max Planck Institute for Physics (Munich), Technical University of Munich, University of Tübingen (Germany), University of Oxford (Great Britain), the Comenius University Bratislava (Slovakia) and the Istituto Nazionale di Fisica Nucleare (INFN, Italy).

The CRESST collaboration currently runs an array of cryogenic detectors in the underground laboratory of the Gran Sasso National Laboratory. The modular detectors used by CRESST facilitate discrimination of background radiation events by the simultaneous measurement of phonon and photon signals from scintillating calcium tungstate crystals. By cooling the detectors to temperatures of a few millikelvin, the excellent discrimination and energy resolution of the detectors allows identification of rare particle events.

CRESST-I took data in 2000 using sapphire detectors with tungsten thermometers. CRESST-II uses CaWO_{4} crystal scintillating calorimeters. It was prototyped in 2004 and had a 47.9 kg-day commissioning run in 2007 and operated 2009 to 2011. CRESST-II Phase 1 experiment observed excess events above known background that could be understood to constitute a dark matter signal. However, later analysis showed that these excess events were due to a previously uncounted for excess of background from the detector itself and not a true signal from dark matter. The source of the excess background in the detector was removed for Phase 2.

Phase 2 has a new CaWO_{4} crystal with better radiopurity, improved detectors, and significantly reduced background. It began July 2013 to explore excess signals in the prior run. The results of Phase 2 showed no signal above expected background, proving that the result of Phase 1 had indeed been due to excess background by components of the detector.

CRESST-II first detected the alpha decay of tungsten-180 (^{180}W). CRESST-II phase 1 full results were published in 2012. New phase 2 results have been presented in July 2014 with a limit on spin-independent WIMP-nucleon scattering for WIMP masses below 3 GeV/c^{2}.

In 2015 the CRESST detectors were upgraded by a sensitivity factor of 100 allowing dark-matter particles with a mass around that of a proton to be detected.

In 2019, the team reported results of the first phase of CRESST-III, which ran from 2016 to 2018. CRESST-III used a single 23.6-g CaWO_{4} detector with a lowered energy threshold of 30.1 eV, about 1/10 that of CRESST-II. This allows the detection of WIMPs as light as 0.16 GeV/c^{2}, slightly heavier than a pion. Despite many events from the electron capture decay of ^{179}Ta, there was an unexplained excess of events imparting less than 200 eV.

The experiment is planning an upgrade to accommodate 100 detector modules.
