= Eureka (1907 automobile) =

Defunct American motor vehicle manufacturer

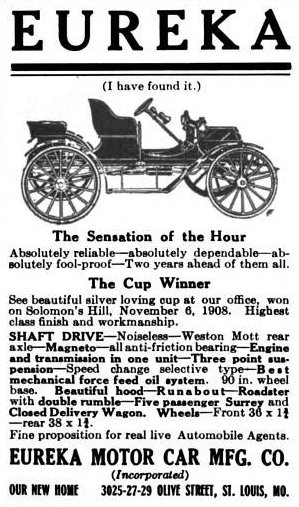
1909 Eureka Advertisement

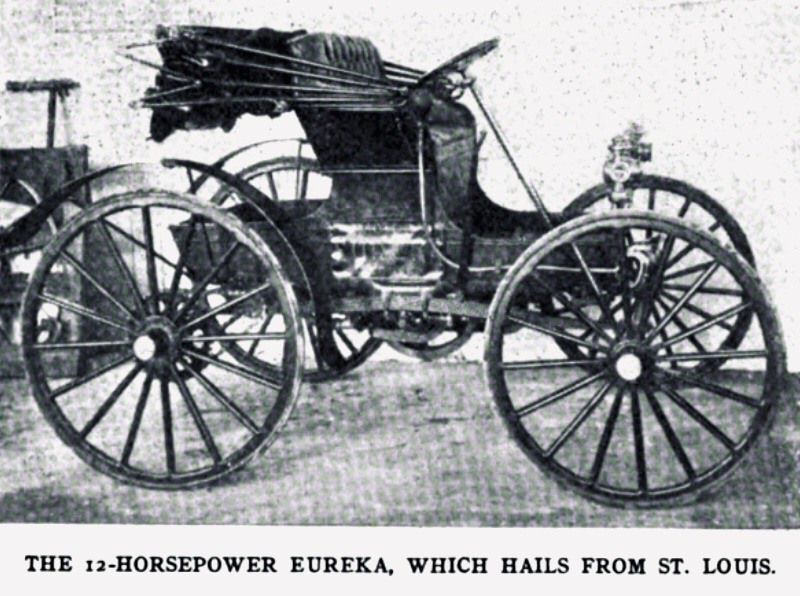
Eureka 12 hp (1908)

The Eureka was an American automobile manufactured from 1907 to 1909 in St. Louis, Missouri. It was a wheel-steered high wheeler with a two-cylinder 10/12 hp air-cooled engine and conventional sliding gear transmission.
