= Centered polygonal number theorem =

Every positive integer is a sum of at most n+2 centered n-gonal numbers

In additive number theory, the centered polygonal number theorem states that every positive integer is a sum of at most n+2 centered n-gonal numbers.

== History ==
In 1850, Sir Frederick Pollock conjectured that every positive integer is the sum of at most 11 centered nonagonal numbers. This conjecture was confirmed as true by Miroslav Kureš in 2023.

The result was generalized to the above theorem by Benjamin Lee Warren and Miroslav Kureš in 2025.

== Examples ==
The first few centered nonagonal numbers are $1, 10, 28, 55, 91, 136, 190, 253, 325, \dots .$ The number 47 can be expressed as a sum of 11 these numbers by two ways:

$47 = 28 + 10 + 1 + 1 + 1 + 1 + 1 + 1 + 1 + 1 + 1;$

$47 = 10 + 10 +10 +10 + 1 + 1 + 1 + 1 + 1 + 1 + 1.$

There is no other way to express the number 47 as a sum of 11 or fewer summands that are centered nonagonal numbers.

Of course, the number of summands can be lower than 11. Note that the number 480 is the following sum:

$480 = 253 + 136 + 91.$

Analogously, here too, there is no other way to express the number 480 as a sum of 11 or fewer summands that are centered nonagonal numbers.
