= List of people from Chicago =

Flag of Chicago

The following list includes notable people who were born or have lived in Chicago, Illinois, United States. For a similar list organized alphabetically by last name, see the category page People from Chicago, Illinois.

== Academics, science, and engineering ==
Name	Image	Birth	Death	Known for	Association	Reference
Dankmar Adler		Jul 3, 1844	Apr 16, 1900	Architect: designed the Guaranty Building, Chicago Stock Exchange Building, and Wainwright Building, considered to be the world's first skyscraper	Lived and died in Chicago	
Mortimer Adler		Dec 28, 1902	Jun 28, 2001	Philosopher, educator, and popular author	University of Chicago professor; lived in Chicago	
Milburn Akers		May 4, 1900	May 27, 1970	President of Shimer College and Sun-Times editor	Born and worked in Chicago	
Saul Alinsky	Saul_Alinsky_(IA_southerncampus1969univ)_(page_101_crop)	Jan 30, 1909	Jun 12, 1972	Community organizer and writer; considered to be the founder of modern community organizing	Born in Chicago	
Myrtle Bachelder		Mar 13, 1908	May 22, 1997	Metals chemist and Women's Army Corps officer; worked on the Manhattan Project	University of Chicago professor; lived and died in Chicago	
Cynthia Bathurst				Mathematician and animal welfare advocate		
Jacob Bolotin		Jan 3, 1888	Apr 1, 1924	First totally blind physician fully licensed to practice medicine		
Sophonisba P. Breckinridge		Apr 1, 1866	Jul 30, 1948	Founder, School of Social Works Administration at the University of Chicago	Lived and worked in Chicago	
Allan G. Brodie		Oct 31, 1897	Jan 2, 1976	Orthodontics educator		
Daniel Burnham		Sep 4, 1846	Jun 1, 1912	Architect		
Marvin Camras		Jan 1, 1916	Jun 23, 1995	Inventor		
Philo Carpenter		Feb 27, 1805	Aug 7, 1886	First Chicago pharmacist		
Marva Collins		Aug 31, 1936	Jun 24, 2015	Educator		
Zachary Taylor Davis		May 26, 1872	Dec 16, 1946	Architect		
Donald J. DePorter		Jan 21, 1942	Aug 4, 1996	Philanthropist		
John Dewey		Oct 20, 1859	Jun 1, 1952	Philosopher, psychologist, and educational reformer; an early developer of pragmatism and one of the founders of functional psychology	University of Chicago professor and founder of the University of Chicago Laboratory Schools	
G. Walter Dittmar		1872	1949	First president of the Illinois State Dental Society		
E. Lloyd Du Brul		Apr 5, 1909	Jul 24, 1996	Dental anatomist		
Rockwell King DuMoulin		Jan 31, 1906	Feb 11, 1983	Architect	Professor and department chair at the Rhode Island School of Design	
Helen Flanders Dunbar		May 14, 1902	Aug 21, 1959	Early figure in U.S. psychosomatic medicine		
Charles E. Fox		Jul 1, 1870	Oct 31, 1926	Architect		
James Ingo Freed		Jun 23, 1930	Dec 15, 2005	Architect		
Marjorie Grene		Dec 13, 1910	Mar 16, 2009	Philosopher		
Marion Mahony Griffin		Feb 14, 1871	Aug 10, 1961	Architect		
Walter Burley Griffin		Nov 24, 1876	Feb 11, 1937	Architect		
George Ellery Hale		Jun 29, 1868	Feb 21, 1938	Astronomer		
Michelle Hawkins				Meteorologist	Grew up in Chicago	
Max Henius		Jun 16, 1859	Nov 15, 1935	Biochemist; co-founder of American Brewing Academy		
John Augur Holabird		May 4, 1886	1945	Architect		
William Holabird		Sep 11, 1854	Jul 19, 1923	Architect		
Dorothy Evans Holmes		1943		Psychoanalytic thinker known for her work on racial and cultural trauma	Born in Chicago	
Helmut Jahn		Jan 4, 1940	May 8, 2021	Architect		
William Le Baron Jenney		Sep 25, 1832	Jun 14, 1907	Architect		
Leon Kass		Feb 12, 1939		Writer and chair of The President's Council on Bioethics		
Peter Karter		1922	Mar 30, 2010	Nuclear engineer and pioneer of the recycling industry		
Fazlur Khan		Apr 3, 1929	Mar 27, 1982	Civil engineer		
Ed Krupp		Nov 18, 1944		Astronomer, archeoastronomer, director of Griffith Observatory, Los Angeles	Born in Chicago	
T. D. A. Lingo		Dec 14, 1924	May 13, 1993	Folk singer, radio personality, brain researcher	Born in Chicago	
George W. Maher		Dec 25, 1864	Sep 12, 1926	Architect		
Benjamin H. Marshall		1874	Jun 19, 1940	Architect		
Maury Massler		1912	1990	Dental educator		
Charles G. Maurice		1911	1997	Dental educator		
Philip Maxwell		1799	1859	Early Chicago physician		
Ludwig Mies van der Rohe		Mar 27, 1886	Aug 19, 1969	Architect		
Michele Moody-Adams		Aug 31, 1956		African American philosopher and academic administrator		
Frederick B. Moorehead		1875	1944	Dental educator		
Charles Murphy		Feb 9, 1890	May 22, 1985	Architect		
Frederick Bogue Noyes		1872	1961	Dental educator		
Don Patinkin		Jan 8, 1922	Aug 7, 1995	Israeli-American economist; president of the Hebrew University of Jerusalem		
Ralph Pearson		Jan 12, 1919	Oct 12, 2022	Inorganic chemist; developed the concept of hard and soft acids and bases (HSAB theory)	Born in Chicago	
Dwight H. Perkins		Mar 26, 1867	Nov 2, 1941	Architect		
Sister Joel Read		Dec 30, 1926	May 25, 2017	President of Alverno College; longest-serving college president in U.S. history	Born in Chicago	
Kennedy J. Reed		May 24, 1944	Jun 20, 2023	Theoretical atomic physicist in the Theory Group in the Physics & Advanced Technologies Directorate at Lawrence Livermore National Laboratory (LLNL); a founder of the National Physical Science Consortium (NPSC)	Raised in south Chicago	
Theodore Regensteiner		May 17, 1868	Jul 15, 1952	Inventor of the four-color lithographic press		
Earl W. Renfroe		Jan 9, 1907	Nov 14, 2000	Orthodontist and African-American activist		
Martin Roche		1853	1927	Architect		
John Wellborn Root		Jan 10, 1850	Jan 15, 1891	Architect		
John Wellborn Root Jr.		1887	1963	Architect		
Paul S. Russell		Jan 22, 1925	Aug 22, 2026	Physician and distinguished professor at Harvard Medical School	Born in Chicago	
Isaac Schour		1900	1964	President of the International Association for Dental Research		
Donald Spero		Aug 9, 1939		Physicist; venture capitalist; and European Rowing Championships bronze medalist and Olympic rower (1964)		
Leo Strauss		Sep 20, 1899	Oct 18, 1973	Political philosopher		
Louis Sullivan		Sep 3, 1856	Apr 14, 1924	Architect		
Emily Temple-Wood		May 24, 1994		Physician and Wikipedia editor who was named 2016 co-Wikimedian of the Year	Born in Chicago	
Stanley D. Tylman		1893	1982	Dental educator, wrote Theory and Practice of Crown and Bridge Prosthesis		
Marijuana Pepsi Vandyck				Education professional	Raised in Chicago	
Thorstein Veblen		Jul 30, 1857	Aug 3, 1929	Economist and social critic		
Robert Wald		Jun 29, 1947		Gravitational physicist, author of the textbook General Relativity (1984), and recipient of the Einstein Prize (APS)	University of Chicago professor	
Frank Lloyd Wright		Jun 8, 1867	Apr 9, 1959	Architect		

=== Nobel laureates and Fields medalists ===
Name	Image	Birth	Death	Known for	Association	Reference
Jane Addams		Sep 6, 1860	May 21, 1935	Social worker and activist; founder of Hull House; first American woman awarded the Nobel Peace Prize (1931)	Lived and died in Chicago	
Saul Bellow		Jun 10, 1915	Apr 5, 2005	Author; Nobel laureate in Literature (1976); Pulitzer Prize for Fiction (1976)	Grew up in the Humboldt Park neighborhood of Chicago	
Subrahmanyan Chandrasekhar		Oct 19, 1910	Aug 21, 1995	Astrophysicist; Nobel laureate in physics (1983)	University of Chicago professor; died in Chicago	
James Cronin		Sep 29, 1931	Aug 25, 2016	Nuclear physicist; Nobel laureate in physics (1964)	University of Chicago professor; born in Chicago	
Vladimir Drinfeld		Feb 4, 1954		Pioneering mathematician; Fields medalist (1990)	University of Chicago professor	
Enrico Fermi		Sep 29, 1901	Nov 28, 1954	Experimental and theoretical physicist, co-developer of the first nuclear reactor (Chicago Pile-1); Nobel laureate in physics (1938)	University of Chicago professor; died in Chicago	
James Franck		Aug 26, 1882	May 21, 1964	Chemical physicist and member of the Manhattan Project; Nobel laureate in physics (1925)	Director of the Chemistry Division of the Metallurgical Laboratory at the University of Chicago	
Milton Friedman		Jul 31, 1912	Nov 16, 2006	Leader of the Chicago school of economics; Nobel laureate in economics (1976);	University of Chicago professor and graduate	
James Heckman		Apr 14, 1944		Born in Chicago; member of the Chicago school of economics; Nobel laureate in economics (2000)	University of Chicago professor	
Michael Hudson		Mar 14, 1939		Economics professor		
Leon M. Lederman		Jul 15, 1922	Oct 3, 2018	Experimental physicist; Nobel laureate in physics (1988); director emeritus of Fermilab; founded the Illinois Mathematics and Science Academy	Illinois Institute of Technology professor	
Yoichiro Nambu		Jan 18, 1921	Jul 5, 2015	Theoretical physicist; Nobel laureate in physics (2008)	University of Chicago professor	
Theodore Schultz		Apr 2, 1902	Feb 26, 1998	Chair of the Chicago school of economics; Nobel laureate in economics (1979)	University of Chicago professor	
Herbert A. Simon		Jun 15, 1916	Feb 9, 2001	Political, economic, psychological and computer science polymath; Nobel laureate in economic sciences (1978)	Illinois Institute of Technology professor and University of Chicago graduate	
George E. Smith		May 10, 1930	May 28, 2025	Applied physicist; co-inventor of the charge-coupled device; Nobel laureate in physics (2009)	University of Chicago graduate	
James D. Watson		Apr 6, 1928	November 6, 2025	Biologist; Nobel Prize in Physiology or Medicine (1962); proposed the correct structure for DNA with Francis Crick while a postdoctoral fellow in the laboratory of Sir Lawrence Bragg in the Department of Physics at the University of Cambridge in 1953	Grew up on the south side of Chicago and attended public schools; graduated from the University of Chicago with a B.S. (1947) in Zoology at age 19	
Frank Wilczek		May 15, 1951		Theoretical physicist; Nobel laureate in physics (2004)	Enrolled at the University of Chicago at 15 years old	
Robert Woodrow Wilson		Jan 10, 1936		Founder and first director of Fermilab; Nobel laureate in physics (1978)		

== Authors and writers ==
Name	Image	Birth	Death	Known for	Association	Reference
Franklin Pierce Adams		Nov 15, 1881	Mar 23, 1960	Columnist	Born in Chicago	
Nelson Algren		Mar 28, 1909	May 9, 1981	Author		
Catherine Corley Anderson		Mar 21, 1909	Dec 12, 2001	Children's author	Born in Chicago	
John Anderson		Mar 22, 1836	Feb 24, 1910	Founder and publisher of Skandinaven		
K. A. Applegate		Jul 19, 1956		Author		
Brian Augustyn		Nov 2, 1954	Feb 1, 2022	Comic book editor and writer	Born in Chicago	
Dean Baker		Jul 13, 1958		Macroeconomist		
Allan Bloom		Sep 14, 1930	Oct 7, 1992	Writer and translator		
Dmitri Borgmann		Oct 22, 1927	Dec 7, 1985	Writer		
Candy Dawson Boyd		Aug 8, 1946		Writer and activist		
Ray Bradbury		Aug 22, 1920	Jun 5, 2012	Author	Born and raised in Chicago suburb, Waukegan	
Gwendolyn Brooks		Jun 7, 1917	Dec 3, 2000	Poet		
Algis Budrys		Jan 9, 1931	Jun 9, 2008	Author		
Edgar Rice Burroughs		Sep 1, 1875	Mar 19, 1950	Author	Born in Chicago	
Chris Bury		Dec 10, 1953		Journalist		
Jack Cafferty		Dec 14, 1942		Journalist	Born in Chicago	
Jack Canfield		Aug 19, 1944		Author of Chicken Soup for The Soul		
John Chancellor		Jul 14, 1927	Jul 12, 1996	Journalist		
Raymond Chandler		Jul 23, 1888	Mar 26, 1959	Writer	Born in Chicago	
Shams Charania		Apr 1, 1994		Sports writer	Born in Chicago	
Sandra Cisneros		Dec 20, 1954		Author	Born in Chicago	
Diablo Cody		Jun 14, 1978		Screenwriter		
Daniel Cohen		Mar 12, 1936	May 6, 2018	Children's writer	Born in Chicago	
Allan Cox		Jun 3, 1937	Aug 28, 2016	Writer	Residing in Chicago	
James Gould Cozzens		Aug 19, 1903	Aug 9, 1978	Novelist	Born in Chicago	
Michael Crichton		Oct 23, 1942	Nov 4, 2008	Writer	Born in Chicago	
Philip K. Dick		Dec 16, 1928	Mar 2, 1982	Writer	Born in Chicago	
Charles Dickinson		Jun 4, 1951		Writer		
Elizabeth Dilling		Apr 19, 1894	Apr 30, 1966	Writer and far-right activist	Born in Chicago	
Mike Downey		Aug 9, 1951	Jun 12, 2024	Newspaper columnist		
Finley Peter Dunne		Jul 10, 1867	Apr 24, 1936	Writer, humorist (Mr. Dooley)	Born in Chicago	
Stuart Dybek		1942		Author	Born in Chicago	
Roger Ebert		Jun 18, 1942	Apr 4, 2013	Film critic	Lived and died in Chicago	
Dave Eggers		Mar 12, 1970		Writer, editor, publisher		
James T. Farrell		Feb 27, 1904	Aug 22, 1979	Writer	Born in Chicago	
Kenneth Fearing		Jul 28, 1902	Jun 26, 1961	Poet, writer		
Edna Ferber		Aug 15, 1885	Apr 16, 1968	Author, playwright		
Leon Forrest		Jan 8, 1937	Nov 6, 1997	Writer		
Henry Blake Fuller		Jan 9, 1857	Jul 28, 1929	Writer	Born in Chicago	
Mary Onahan Gallery		Jul 22, 1866	Jan 12, 1941	Writer, editor		
Larry Gelbart		Feb 25, 1928	Sep 11, 2009	Comedy writer	Born in Chicago	
Miss Major Griffin-Gracy		Oct 25, 1946	October 13, 2025	Author, activist, community organizer	Born in Chicago	
John Gunther		Aug 30, 1901	May 29, 1970	Writer		
Gary Gygax		Jul 27, 1938	Mar 4, 2008	Author	Born in Chicago	
Lorraine Hansberry		May 19, 1930	Jan 12, 1965	Playwright	Born in Chicago	
Chris Hansen		Sep 13, 1959		Journalist	Born in Chicago	
Reidar Rye Haugan		Sep 18, 1893	Oct 1, 1972	Newspaper publisher and playwright		
Ben Hecht		Feb 28, 1894	Apr 18, 1964	Screenwriter, playwright, journalist, director, and producer	Lived and worked in Chicago	
Larry Heinemann		Jan 18, 1944	Dec 11, 2019	Novelist	Born in Chicago	
Ernest Hemingway		Jul 21, 1899	Jul 2, 1961	Novelist, short story writer, and journalist	Born and raised in Chicago suburb, Oak Park; lived and worked in Chicago	
Robert Herrick		Apr 21, 1868	Dec 23, 1938	Novelist		
Seymour Hersh		Apr 8, 1937		Journalist	Born in Chicago	
Aphrodite Jones		Nov 27, 1958		Author	Born in Chicago	
Stacey Kade				Author		
John Kass		Jun 25, 1956		Journalist	Born in Chicago	
Hoda Katebi		Jan 27, 1995		Fashion blogger and activist	Resides in Chicago	
Kirke La Shelle		Sep 23, 1862	May 16, 1905	Newspaper reporter, editor, playwright and producer	Worked in Chicago	
Ann Landers (aka Ruth Crowley; aka Esther Pauline Friedman Lederer)				Columnist		
Adam Langer		1967		Novelist	Born in Chicago	
Ring Lardner		Mar 6, 1885	Sep 25, 1933	Sports columnist, short story writer, playwright, composer, and lyricist	Worked & lived in Chicago	
Ring Lardner Jr.		Aug 19, 1915	Oct 31, 2000	Journalist and screenwriter	Born in Chicago	
Leo Lerner		1907	1965	Newspaper publisher; founder of Lerner Newspapers	Born in Chicago	
Mike MacDonald		1960		Photographer and author		
Tom Mandel		Sep 12, 1942		Poet	Born in Chicago	
Jean Martirez		Jan 19, 1963		Journalist	Born in Chicago	
Merrill C. Meigs		Nov 25, 1883	Jan 26, 1968	Newspaper publisher		
A. R. Morlan		Jan 3, 1958	Jan 6, 2016	Author	Born in Chicago	
Susan Murphy-Milano			Oct 28, 2012	Author and radio host; advocate for victims of domestic violence	Born in Chicago	
Charles Gilman Norris		Apr 23, 1881	Jul 25, 1945	Author		
Frank Norris		Mar 5, 1870	Oct 25, 1902	Novelist	Born in Chicago	
Clarence Page		Jun 2, 1947		Columnist		
Pidgeon Pagonis		1986		Intersex activist, writer, artist, and consultant	Born in Chicago	
Sara Paretsky		Jun 8, 1947		Novelist		
Ed Paschke		Jun 22, 1939	Nov 25, 2004	Artist	Born and died in Chicago	
Cissy Patterson		Nov 7, 1881	Jul 24, 1948	Journalist and newspaper editor		
Frederik Pohl		Nov 26, 1919	Sep 2, 2013	Author and futurist		
Margaret Horton Potter		May 20, 1881	Dec 22, 1911	Novelist	Born and died in Chicago	
Henry Rago		1915	1969	Poet; editor of Poetry Magazine (1955–1969)		
Wilhelm Rapp		Jul 14, 1827	Feb 28, 1907	Journalist and editor	Lived and died in Chicago	
Hermann Raster		May 6, 1827	Jul 24, 1891	Journalist and politician; editor of the Illinois Staats-Zeitung (1867–1891)	Lived in Chicago, buried in Graceland Cemetery	
Mike Resnick		Mar 5, 1942	Jan 9, 2020	Author		
Dean Richards		Mar 31, 1954		Film critic	Born in Chicago	
Mike Royko		Sep 19, 1932	Apr 29, 1997	Columnist	Born and died in Chicago	
Ernest Samuels		May 19, 1903	Feb 12, 1996	Biographer; recipient of the Bancroft Prize and the Pulitzer Prize for Biography or Autobiography	Born in Chicago	
Ross Allen Rosenberg		May 16, 1961		Psychotherapist and author	Born in Chicago	
Carl Sandburg		Jan 6, 1878	Jul 22, 1967	Poet; recipient of three Pulitzer Prizes	Lived in Chicago	
Dan Savage		Oct 7, 1964		Columnist	Born in Chicago	
Sandra Seaton		Jul 10, 1942		Playwright and librettist		
Sidney Sheldon		Feb 11, 1917	Jan 30, 2007	Playwright, screenwriter, novelist		
William L. Shirer		Feb 23, 1904	Dec 28, 1993	Journalist and historian	Born in Chicago	
Dora Shulner		Jul 24, 1890	May 12, 1964	Yiddish writer	Resided in Chicago	
Shel Silverstein		Sep 25, 1930	May 10, 1999	Poet, songwriter, and children's writer	Born in Chicago	
Gene Siskel		Jan 26, 1946	Feb 20, 1999	Film critic	Born in Chicago	
Dejan Stojanović		Mar 11, 1959		Poet, writer, essayist, philosopher, businessman, and former journalist		
Alfred Szklarski		Jan 21, 1912	Apr 9, 1992	Author	Born in Chicago	
Studs Terkel		May 16, 1912	Oct 31, 2008	Broadcaster and author	Lived and died in Chicago	
James Tiptree Jr.		Aug 24, 1915	May 19, 1987	Author	Born in Chicago	
Joseph A. Tunzi		Jul 25, 1953		Author, publisher, producer, researcher, archivist, historian; "one of the foremost authorities on Elvis Presley"	Born in Chicago	
Scott Turow		Apr 12, 1949		Author	Born in Chicago	
Irving Wallace		Mar 19, 1916	Jun 29, 1990	Author	Born in Chicago	
Gene Wolfe		May 7, 1931	Apr 14, 2019	Author		
Pamela Zoline		June 20, 1941		Author, painter, activist	Born in Chicago	

== Business and philanthropy ==
Name	Image	Birth	Death	Known for	Association	Reference
Anthony Adducci		Aug 14, 1937	Sep 19, 2006	A pioneer of the medical device industry; founder of Cardiac Pacemakers, Inc., which manufactured the world's first lithium battery-powered artificial pacemaker	Born in Chicago	
Bob Bernard		May 23, 1967	Feb 2, 2007	Entrepreneur		
William McCormick Blair		May 2, 1884	Mar 29, 1982	Financier	Born in Chicago	
William McCormick Blair Jr.		Oct 24, 1916	Aug 29, 2015	U.S. ambassador to Denmark (1961–1964) and U.S. ambassador to the Philippines (1964–1967)	Partner in the Chicago law firm Gerlach & O'Brien	
David Bohnett		Apr 2, 1956		Philanthropist and technology entrepreneur	Born in Chicago	
John O. Butler				Businessman, dentist and periodontist	Born and practiced in Chicago	
Kevin Cushing		1956		Executive officer of AlphaGraphics	Born in Chicago	
Charles Deering		Jul 31, 1852	Feb 5, 1927	Businessman, art collector, and philanthropist		
William Deering		Apr 25, 1826	Dec 9, 1913	Businessman and philanthropist		
Francis Dewes		Apr 8, 1845	Dec 21, 1922	German immigrant, brewer, millionaire, original owner of the historic mansion Francis J. Dewes House		
Dr. Fannie Emanuel		Jul 31, 1871	Mar 31, 1934	Founded the Emanuel Settlement House		
Marshall Field		Aug 18, 1834	Jan 16, 1906	Entrepreneur		
Ada Sawyer Garrett		1856	1938	19th-century socialite and philanthropist		
William O. Goodman		1848	1936	Lumber tycoon		
Robert Halperin		Jan 26, 1908	May 8, 1985	Olympic and Pan American Games yachting medalist; quarterback for the Brooklyn Dodgers; decorated World War II US Navy sailor; co-founder of Lands' End, and chairman of Commercial Light Company	Born in Chicago	
H. G. Haugan		Nov 7, 1840	Jan 29, 1921	Railroad executive		
Helge Alexander Haugan		Oct 26, 1847	May 17, 1909	Banking executive		
Anton C. Hesing		Jan 6, 1823	Mar 31, 1895	Owner of the Chicago-based Illinois Staats-Zeitung; Cook County sheriff 1860–1862	Lived and died in Chicago	
Gurdon Saltonstall Hubbard		Aug 22, 1802	Sep 14, 1886	Early Chicago developer		
John H. Johnson		Jan 19, 1918	Aug 8, 2005	Founded the Johnson Publishing Company, served on the board of numerous companies	Business and life based in Chicago	
Ray Kroc		Oct 5, 1902	Jan 14, 1984	First CEO of McDonald's		
Matthew Laflin		Dec 16, 1803	May 21, 1897	Gunpowder manufacturer and philanthropist		
Mary Lewis Langworthy		Mar 31, 1872	Jan 15, 1949	President, Chicago Woman's Club	Lived in Chicago	
John R. Lindgren		Feb 20, 1855	Apr 29, 1915	Banking executive		
Horatio G. Loomis			1900	Organizer of the Chicago Board of Trade		
Catherine T. MacArthur		Nov 23, 1908	Dec 15, 1981	Philanthropist		
Arthur B. McBride		Mar 20, 1888	Nov 10, 1972	Businessman, co-founded the Cleveland Browns football team	Born and raised in Chicago	
Renetta McCann		Dec 8, 1956		Advertising and public relations executive who served as CEO of Starcom Mediavest Group in North America	Born and raised in Chicago	
Brooks McCormick		Feb 23, 1917	Aug 15, 2006	Chief executive officer of International Harvester; art collector	Born in Chicago	
Chauncey McCormick		Dec 7, 1884	Sep 8, 1954	Businessman and art collector	Trustee of the Art Institute of Chicago	
Cyrus Hall McCormick, Sr.		Feb 15, 1809	May 13, 1884	Founder of the McCormick Harvesting Machine Company	Lived and died in Chicago	
Cyrus Hall McCormick II		May 16, 1859	1936	President of the McCormick Harvesting Machine Company (1884–1902)	Born in Chicago	
Harold Fowler McCormick		May 2, 1872	Oct 16, 1941	Chairman of the board of International Harvester Company	Trustee of the University of Chicago	
Joseph M. McCormick		May 16, 1877	Feb 25, 1925	U.S. senator from Illinois; member of the U.S. House of Representatives from Illinois's 1st district	Born in Chicago	
Katharine McCormick		Aug 27, 1875	Dec 28, 1967	Biologist, suffragist, philanthropist, and heir to a substantial part of the McCormick family fortune	Grew up in Chicago	
L. Hamilton McCormick		May 27, 1859	Feb 2, 1934	Author, inventor, art collector and sculptor	Born in Chicago	
Leander J. McCormick		Feb 8, 1819	Feb 20, 1900	Farmer, inventor, manufacturer, and businessman	Lived and died in Chicago	
Robert R. McCormick		Jul 30, 1880	Apr 1, 1955	Owner and publisher of the Chicago Tribune	Born in Chicago	
Robert Sanderson McCormick		Jul 26, 1849	Apr 16, 1919	U.S. ambassador to Austria-Hungary, Imperial Russia, and France	Lived in Chicago	
Ruth Hanna McCormick		Mar 27, 1880	Dec 31, 1944	Member of the U.S. House of Representatives from Illinois's at-large district	Lived and died in Chicago	
William Grigsby McCormick		Jun 3, 1851	Nov 29, 1941	Businessman; member of the New York Stock Exchange; co-founder of the Kappa Sigma college fraternity	Born in Chicago; Chicago City Council as alderman representing the 18th ward	
William Sanderson McCormick		Nov 2, 1815	Sep 27, 1865	Inventor and founder of the McCormick Harvesting Machine Company	Lived in Chicago	
Blythe McGarvie				President of Leadership for International Finance, LLC		
Abraham Lincoln Neiman		Jul 4, 1875	Oct 21, 1970	Businessman and member of the Neiman Marcus family		
Agnes Nestor		Jun 24, 1880	Dec 28, 1948	Labor activist, politician, founder of the International Glove Workers Union of America, president of Chicago Women's Union League	Lived and died in Chicago	
William S. Paley		Sep 28, 1901	Oct 26, 1990	CBS executive		
Bertha Palmer		May 22, 1849	May 5, 1918	Socialite and philanthropist		
Potter Palmer		May 20, 1826	May 4, 1902	Entrepreneur		
George Pullman		Mar 3, 1831	Oct 19, 1897	Entrepreneur and inventor		
Thomas Pritzker				Chairman of Hyatt and member of the Pritzker family		
Wallace Rasmussen		Jul 11, 1914	Sep 21, 2008	Businessman and philanthropist; CEO of Beatrice Foods Co.	Lived and worked in Chicago	
Frank C. Rathje		Aug 21, 1881	Feb 24, 1967	Depression-era banker, businessman, and philanthropist		
William Donald Scherzer		Jan 27, 1858	Jul 20, 1893	Inventor of the Scherzer rolling lift bridge		
W. Clement Stone		May 4, 1902	Sep 3, 2002	Entrepreneur; founder of what is known today as AON Corporation		
Edmund Dick Taylor		Oct 18, 1804	Dec 4, 1891	Banker, railroad executive and entrepreneur; known as "father of the greenback"		
Charles H. Wacker		Aug 29, 1856	Oct 31, 1929	Businessman and philanthropist, director of the 1893 World's Columbian Exposition	Born and lived in Chicago	
Ty Warner		Sep 3, 1944		Entrepreneur known for Beanie Babies and many other successful plush toys	Born in Chicago and grew up in suburban La Grange	
Erick Williams				Chef	Born and raised in Chicago	
Charles Yerkes		Jun 25, 1837	Dec 29, 1905	Entrepreneur		

== Crime ==
Name	Image	Birth	Death	Known for	Association	Reference
Charles Albanese		Jun 13, 1937	Sep 20, 1995	Serial killer	Born in Chicago	
David Barksdale		May 24, 1947	Sep 2, 1974	Street gang leader	Leader of Folk Nation; died in Chicago	
Rudy Bladel		Dec 8, 1932	Nov 15, 2006	Serial killer	Born in Chicago	
Al Capone		Jan 17, 1899	Jan 25, 1947	Boss of the Chicago Outfit 1925–1931	Chicago Outfit	
Andre Crawford		Mar 20, 1962	Mar 18, 2017	Serial killer	Born in Chicago	
Laurie Dann		Oct 18, 1957	May 20, 1988	School shooter	Born in Chicago	
John Dillinger		Jun 22, 1903	Jul 22, 1934	Bank robber	Died in Chicago	
Jeff Fort		Feb 20, 1947		Gang leader and convicted terrorist	Grew up in Chicago	
John Wayne Gacy		Mar 17, 1942	May 10, 1994	Serial killer	Born in Chicago	
Sam Giancana		Jun 15, 1908	Jun 19, 1975	Boss of the Chicago Outfit	Chicago Outfit	
Robert Hanssen		Apr 18, 1944	Jun 5, 2023	FBI agent; convicted spy for Russia	Born in Chicago	
H. H. Holmes		May 16, 1861	May 7, 1896	Serial killer	Lived and operated in Chicago	
Ted Kaczynski		May 22, 1942	Jun 10, 2023	Unabomber, mathematician and domestic terrorist	Born and briefly lived in Chicago	
Leopold and Loeb		Nov 19, 1904 (Leopold); Jun 11, 1905 (Loeb)	Jan 28, 1936 (Loeb); Aug 29, 1971 (Leopold)	Murderers	Born in Chicago	
Erich Muenter		Mar 25, 1871	Jul 6, 1915	Imperial German spy, political terrorist, and failed assassin of J. P. Morgan Jr.	Lived in Chicago	
Baby Face Nelson		Dec 6, 1908	Nov 27, 1934	Mobster	Born in Chicago	
Jose Padilla (aka Abdullah al-Muhajir)		Oct 18, 1970		Alleged terrorist	Lived in Chicago	
Jack Ruby		Mar 25, 1911	Jan 3, 1967	Killed Lee Harvey Oswald	Born in Chicago	
Eva Shaver				Midwife convicted of manslaughter while providing illegal abortions, 1915	Worked in Chicago	
Ronald Gene Simmons		Jul 15, 1940	Jun 25, 1990	Spree killer	Born in Chicago	
Wanda Stopa		May 5, 1900	Apr 25, 1924	Murderer	Lived and studied in Chicago; was its youngest and first female assistant U.S. district attorney	
George Streeter		1837	Jan 22, 1921	Riverboat captain and squatter	Lived and died in Chicago	

== Fine arts ==
Name	Image	Birth	Death	Known for	Association	Reference
Emil Biorn		Jun 7, 1864	1935	Sculptor, painter and composer		
Emilija Bucik Razman		1935	2024	Painter and illustrator	Lived and worked in Chicago for decades	
Edward William Carlson		May 4, 1883	Jul 26, 1932	Artist	Born and raised in Chicago	
Edward Gorey		Feb 22, 1925	Apr 15, 2000	Artist	Born in Chicago	
Adelaide S. Hall		Nov 2, 1857	Jun 3, 1924	Art connoisseur, curator, promoter and critic	Lived in Chicago	
Grace Jeffers		Sep 1, 1967		Design educator	Born in Chicago	
June Leaf		Aug 4, 1929	Jul 1, 2024	Artist	Born and raised in Chicago	
Vivian Maier		Feb 1, 1926	Apr 21, 2009	Photographer		
Edgar Miller		1899	Jun 1, 1993	Designer, artist, sculptor, stained glass maker, wood carver, metal worker	Born in Idaho Falls, moved to Chicago in 1917, died in Chicago	
Norman Parish		Aug 26, 1937	Jul 8, 2013	Artist and art dealer		
Harmonia Rosales		1984		Artist	Born in Chicago	
Charlotte Rothstein Ross		1912	1991	Lithograph artist	Born and raised in Chicago	

== Frontier ==
Name	Image	Birth	Death	Known for	Association	Reference
Louis Jolliet		Sep 21, 1645	1700	French explorer	Lived for one winter in what is now Chicago	
John Kinzie		Dec 3, 1763	Jan 6, 1828	Early Chicago settler	Lived in what is now Chicago	
Jean Baptiste Point du Sable			Aug 28, 1818	Early Chicago settler	Lived in what is now Chicago	

== Media ==
Name	Image	Birth	Death	Known for	Association	Reference
Gillian Anderson		Aug 9, 1968		Actress	Born in Chicago	
Stanley Andrews		Aug 28, 1891	Jun 23, 1969	Actor	Born in Chicago	
Dominic Armato		Nov 18, 1976		Voice actor	Born in Chicago	
Lewis Arquette		Dec 14, 1935	Feb 10, 2001	Actor	Born in Chicago	
Patricia Arquette		Apr 8, 1968		Actress	Born in Chicago	
Reiko Aylesworth		Dec 9, 1972		Actress		
Barney Balaban		Jun 8, 1887	Mar 7, 1971	Head of Paramount Pictures		
Bob Balaban		Aug 16, 1945		Actor, director and producer	Born in Chicago	
Adam Baldwin		Feb 27, 1962		Actor		
Leonard Baldy		Feb 15, 1927	May 2, 1960	Police officer; Chicago's first helicopter traffic reporter		
Ryan Bank		Apr 27, 1981		Media producer		
Ike Barinholtz		Feb 18, 1977		Actor and comedian	Born in Chicago	
Ralph Bellamy		Jun 17, 1904	Nov 29, 1991	Actor	Born in Chicago	
Jim Belushi		Jun 15, 1954		Actor, comedian	Born in Chicago	
John Belushi		Jan 24, 1949	Mar 5, 1982	Actor, comedian	Born, lived and worked in Chicago	
Chloe Bennet		Apr 18, 1992		Actress, singer	Born in Chicago	
Jack Benny		Feb 14, 1894	Dec 26, 1974	Actor, comedian	Born in Chicago	
Tom Berenger		May 31, 1949		Actor	Born in Chicago	
Edgar Bergen		Feb 16, 1903	Sep 30, 1978	Ventriloquist	Born in Chicago	
Shelley Berman		Feb 3, 1925	Sep 1, 2017	Comedian	Born in Chicago	
Carlos Bernard		Oct 12, 1962		Actor		
Michael Ian Black		Aug 12, 1971		Comedian	Born in Chicago	
Budd Boetticher		Jul 29, 1916	Nov 29, 2001	Film director	Born in Chicago	
Tom Bosley		Oct 1, 1927	Oct 19, 2010	Actor	Born in Chicago	
Charles Boyce		Sep 21, 1949		Syndicated cartoonist		
Lara Flynn Boyle		Mar 24, 1970		Actress		
Harold Bradley Jr.		Oct 13, 1929	Apr 13, 2021	Football player, actor, singer, artist, TV host, and painter	Born in Chicago	
Andre Braugher		Jul 1, 1962	Dec 11, 2023	Actor	Born in Chicago	
Buddy Bregman		Jul 9, 1930	Jan 8, 2017	Composer		
Pat Byrnes				Cartoonist for The New Yorker		
Colt Cabana		May 6, 1980		Professional wrestler	Lives in Chicago	
John Calhoun		Apr 14, 1808	Feb 20, 1859	Founding publisher of the Chicago Democrat	Cook County treasurer (1837–1841); Chicago city councilman, 1841–1842	
Sarah Wayne Callies		Jun 1, 1977		Actress		
Allan Carr		May 27, 1937	Jun 29, 1999	Producer	Born in Chicago	
Charmian Carr		Dec 27, 1942	Sep 17, 2016	actress	Born in Chicago	
Steve Carell		Aug 16, 1962		Actor, comedian, producer, writer and director	Lived and worked in Chicago	
Dan Castellaneta		Oct 29, 1957		Actor and comedian	Lives in Chicago	
John Chambers		Sep 12, 1922	Aug 25, 2001	Academy Award-winning makeup artist	Born in Chicago	
Kyle Chavarria		Jan 26, 1995		Actress	Born in Chicago	
Whitney Chitwood				Stand-up comedian	Lives in Chicago	
Anna Chlumsky		Dec 3, 1980		Actress	Born in Chicago	
Stephen Colbert		May 13, 1964		Comedian, TV host, actor, and writer	Lived and worked in Chicago	
Lana Condor		May 11, 1997		Actress	Lived in Chicago	
Don Cornelius		Sep 27, 1936	Feb 1, 2012	Creator and former host of Soul Train	Born in Chicago	
Cindy Crawford		Feb 20, 1966		Model and actress	Lived in Chicago	
Ann Cusack		May 22, 1961		Actress		
Joan Cusack		Oct 11, 1962		Actress and comedian		
John Cusack		Jun 28, 1966		Actor		
Clifton Davis		Oct 4, 1945		Actor, composer and minister	Born in Chicago	
May de Sousa		Nov 6, 1884	Aug 8, 1948	Actress and singer	Born, raised, and died in Chicago	
Walt Disney		Dec 5, 1901	Dec 15, 1966	Founder of The Walt Disney Company	Born on the second floor of the house at 2156 Tripp Avenue, in the Hermosa neighborhood of Chicago	
Matt Doherty		Jun 22, 1978		Actor		
Jimmy Dore		Jul 26, 1965		Stand-up comedian and political commentator	Born in Chicago	
Mike Douglas		Aug 11, 1920	Aug 11, 2006	Talk show host	Born in Chicago	
Katie Doyle				Cast member of MTV's Road Rules		
Brian Doyle-Murray		Oct 31, 1945		Actor	Born in Chicago	
Moosie Drier		Aug 6, 1964		Actor and director	Born in Chicago	
Michael Clarke Duncan		Dec 10, 1957	Sep 3, 2012	Actor	Born in Chicago	
Kevin Dunn		Aug 24, 1956		Actor	Born in Chicago	
Dennis Farina		Feb 29, 1944	Jul 22, 2013	Actor, Chicago police officer	Born and raised in the Old Town neighborhood of Chicago	
Mimsy Farmer		Feb 28, 1945		Actress and sculptor	Born in Chicago	
Jon Favreau		Oct 19, 1966		Actor, writer, and director	Lived and worked in Chicago	
Jeremy Felton		Jul 17, 1987		Rapper	Born in Chicago	
Tina Fey		May 18, 1970		Actress, comedian, and writer	Lived and worked in Chicago	
Karen Finley		1956		Performance artist, actress, artist, and recording artist	Born in Chicago	
Michael Flatley		Jul 16, 1958		Dancer	Born in Chicago	
Neil Flynn		Nov 13, 1960		Actor	Born, lived and worked in Chicago; raised in Chicago suburb, Waukegan	
Harrison Ford		Jul 13, 1942		Actor	Born in Chicago; raised in Chicago suburb, Des Plaines	
Drew Fortier		Jul 14, 1987		Musician, filmmaker, actor, and author	Born and raised in Chicago	
Bob Fosse		Jun 23, 1927	Sep 23, 1987	Director, choreographer, and dancer	Born in Chicago	
Redd Foxx		Dec 9, 1922	Oct 11, 1991	Actor and comedian	Grew up in the Bronzeville neighborhood of Chicago	
Dennis Franz		Oct 28, 1944		Actor		
Kathleen Freeman		Feb 17, 1923	Aug 23, 2001	Actress	Born in Chicago	
Tavi Gevinson		Apr 21, 1996		Writer, magazine editor, actress	Born in Chicago	
Marla Gibbs		Jun 14, 1931		Actress	Born in Chicago	
Zach Gilford		Jan 14, 1982		Actor		
Ira Glass		Mar 3, 1959		NPR broadcaster	Lived and worked in Chicago	
Arlene Golonka		Jan 23, 1936	May 31, 2021	Actress	Born in Chicago	
Stuart Gordon		Aug 11, 1947	Mar 24, 2020	Playwright, screenwriter, film director and producer		
Chuck Goudie		Jan 17, 1956		Television reporter and columnist		
Michael Gray		Sep 2, 1951		Actor on Shazam!		
Shecky Greene		Apr 8, 1926	Dec 31, 2023	Comedian	Born in Chicago	
Alexandra Grey		Jan 1, 1991		Actress and musician	Born in Chicago	
Kathy Griffin		Nov 4, 1960		Actress and comedian		
Michael Gross		Jun 21, 1947		Actor	Born in Chicago	
Kevin Hagen		Apr 3, 1928	Jul 9, 2005	Actor	Born in Chicago	
Daryl Hannah		Dec 3, 1960		Actress	Born in Chicago	
Cory Hardrict		Nov 9, 1979		Actor	Born in Chicago	
Steve Harris		Dec 3, 1965		Actor	Born in Chicago	
Wood Harris		Oct 17, 1969		Actor	Born in Chicago	
Hugh Hefner		Apr 9, 1926	Sep 27, 2017	Publisher	Born, lived and worked in Chicago	
Marilu Henner		Apr 6, 1952		Actress	Born in Chicago	
Andy Herren		Nov 14, 1986		Reality-TV contestant; winner of Big Brother 15; show's first openly gay winner	Currently lives in Chicago	
Mark Hollmann		Oct 14, 1963		Composer and lyricist (Urinetown)		
Terrence Howard		Mar 11, 1969		Actor	Born in Chicago	
Jennifer Hudson		Sep 12, 1981		Actress, singer	Born in the Englewood neighborhood of Chicago	
John Hughes		Feb 18, 1950	Aug 6, 2009	Film director and screenwriter	Raised in Chicago suburb, Northbrook; lived and worked in Chicago	
Bonnie Hunt		Sep 22, 1961		Actress, comedian, director, producer	Born in Chicago	
Mel Jackson		Oct 13, 1970		Actor	Born in Chicago	
Sam J. Jones		Aug 12, 1954		Actor	Born in Chicago	
William James Jones				Actor	Born in Chicago	
Philip Kaufman		Oct 23, 1936		Film director	Born in Chicago	
Rachna Khatau		Jan 29, 1981		Actress, writer, singer	Raised in Chicago	
Ruth Kilbourn		1895	1984	Dancer	Resident of Chicago	
Dorothy Kilgallen		Jul 3, 1913	Nov 8, 1965	Media personality, author, journalist, panelist	Born in Chicago	
Karlie Kloss		Aug 3, 1992		Model	Born in Chicago	
Harvey Korman		Feb 15, 1927	May 29, 2008	Actor and comedian	Born in Chicago	
Tessa Kosta		Dec 12, 1890	Aug 23, 1981	Actress (musicals)	Born in Chicago	
Greg Kotis				Playwright (Urinetown)		
Mike Lebovitz				Comedian	Born in Chicago	
Charles Levin		Mar 12, 1949	Jul 2019	Actor	Born in Chicago	
Clara Lipman		1864	1952	Stage actress and playwright	Born in Chicago	
John Lippman				Television executive, acting director of Voice of America		
Ron Livingston		Jun 5, 1967		Actor		
Richard Long		Dec 17, 1927	Dec 21, 1974	Actor	Born in Chicago	
John Loprieno		Oct 7, 1960		Actor	Born in Chicago	
Dave Losso				Stand-up comedian	Born in Chicago	
Lar Lubovitch		Apr 9, 1943		Choreographer	Born in Chicago	
Bernie Mac		Oct 5, 1957	Aug 9, 2008	Actor and comedian	Born and died in Chicago	
Justina Machado		Sep 6, 1972		Actress	Born in Chicago	
William H. Macy		Mar 13, 1950		Actor and producer	Lived in Chicago	
Amy Madigan		Sep 11, 1950		Actress	Born in Chicago	
Michael Madsen		Sep 25, 1957	Jul 3, 2025	Actor	Born in Chicago	
John Mahoney		Jun 20, 1940	Feb 4, 2018	Actor	Lived and worked in Chicago	
Karl Malden		Mar 22, 1912	Jul 1, 2009	Actor	Born in Chicago	
John Malkovich		Dec 9, 1953		Actor	Lived and worked in Chicago	
David Mamet		Nov 30, 1947		Playwright, poet, screenwriter, and director	Born, lived and worked in Chicago	
Larry Manetti		Jul 23, 1947		Actor	Born in Chicago	
Harry Manfredini		Aug 25, 1943		Composer	Born in Chicago	
Michael Mann		Feb 5, 1943		Film director, writer, and producer	Born in Chicago	
Joe Mantegna		Nov 13, 1947		Actor	Born in Chicago	
Ron Masak		Jul 1, 1936	Oct 20, 2022	Actor	Born in Chicago	
Chi McBride		Sep 23, 1961		Actor	Born in Chicago	
Jenny McCarthy		Nov 1, 1972		Actress and Playboy model	Lived in Chicago	
LisaRaye McCoy		Sep 23, 1967		Actress	Born in Chicago	
Frances McDormand		Jun 23, 1957		Actress	Born in Chicago	
Laurie Metcalf		Jun 16, 1955		Actress		
Vincente Minnelli		Feb 28, 1903	Jul 25, 1986	Film director	Born in Chicago	
Kel Mitchell		Aug 25, 1978		Actor and comedian	Born In Chicago	
Rick Moranis		Apr 18, 1953		Actor and comedian		
Cindy Morgan		Sep 29, 1954	Dec 30, 2023	Actress	Born in Chicago	
Trevor Morgan		Nov 26, 1986		Actor	Born in Chicago	
Jennifer Morrison		Apr 12, 1979		Actress and producer	Born in Chicago	
John Mulaney		Aug 26, 1982		Comedian	Born in Chicago	
Bill Murray		Sep 21, 1950		Actor and comedian	Born in Chicago suburb, Evanston; raised in Wilmette; lived and worked in Chicago	
Bob Newhart		Sep 5, 1929	Jul 18, 2024	Actor and comedian		
Nichelle Nichols		Dec 28, 1932	Jul 30, 2022	Actress	Lives in Chicago	
Richard Nickel		May 31, 1928	Apr 13, 1972	Photographer	Born in Chicago	
Christopher Nolan		Jul 30, 1970		Screenwriter, director and producer	Lived in Chicago	
Ken Nordine		Apr 13, 1920	Feb 16, 2019	Voiceover and word jazz recording artist		
Kim Novak		Feb 13, 1933		Actress	Born in Chicago	
Donald O'Connor		Aug 28, 1925	Sep 27, 2003	Actor and dancer	Born in Chicago	
Jim O'Heir		Feb 4, 1962		Actor and comedian	Born and lived in Chicago	
Matt O'Leary		Jul 6, 1987		Actor	Born in Chicago	
Keke Palmer		Aug 26, 1993		Actress and singer		
Mandy Patinkin		Nov 30, 1952		Actor and singer	Born in Chicago	
Jeannie Pepper		Jul 9, 1958		Adult film actress	Born in Chicago	
Jeff Perry		Aug 16, 1955		Actor		
William Petersen		Feb 21, 1953		Actor	Born in Chicago suburb, Evanston; lived and worked in Chicago	
Wally Pfister		Jul 8, 1961		Cinematographer	Born in Chicago	
Jeremy Piven		Jul 26, 1965		Actor		
Bonnie Poe		Oct 15, 1912	Oct 16, 1993	Actress, voice actress	Born in Chicago	
Danny Pudi		Mar 10, 1979		Actor and comedian	Born in Chicago	
CM Punk		Oct 26, 1978		Professional wrestler, professional mixed martial arts commentator, actor, and retired mixed martial artist	Born & lives in Chicago	
Harold Ramis		Nov 21, 1944	Feb 24, 2014	Actor, director, and comedian	Born, lived and worked in Chicago	
Bill Rancic		May 16, 1971		Winner of The Apprentice	Born in Chicago	
Robert Reed		Oct 19, 1932	May 12, 1992	Actor		
John C. Reilly		May 24, 1965		Actor	Born in Chicago	
Ed Renwick		Jun 1, 1938	Mar 6, 2020	Political commentator on WWL-TV (CBS affiliate) in New Orleans, Louisiana	Born in Chicago	
Shonda Rhimes		Jan 13, 1970		Screenwriter, director, and producer; creator and executive producer of Grey's Anatomy	Born in Chicago	
Lucille Ricksen		Aug 22, 1910	Mar 13, 1925	Actress	Born in Chicago	
John Ridgely		Sep 6, 1909	Jan 18, 1968	Actor	Born in Chicago	
Justin Roberts		Dec 29, 1979		Professional wrestling ring announcer	Born in Chicago	
Craig Robinson		Oct 25, 1971		Actor and comedian	Born in Chicago	
Michael Rooker		Apr 6, 1955		Actor	Moved to Chicago at age 13	
Jonathan Rosenbaum		Feb 27, 1943		Film critic		
David Rudman		Jun 1, 1963		Puppeteer		
Jennifer Runyon		Apr 1, 1960		Actress	Born in Chicago	
Robert Ryan		Nov 11, 1909	Jul 11, 1973	Actor	Born in Chicago	
Pat Sajak		Oct 26, 1946		Game show host	Born in Chicago	
Tony Sam				Comedian, actor, television producer	Born in Chicago	
Horatio Sanz		Jun 4, 1969		Actor and comedian	Grew up in Chicago	
Ben Savage		Sep 12, 1980		Actor	Born in Chicago	
Fred Savage		Jul 9, 1976		Actor, director, and producer	Born in Chicago	
Stefanie Scott		Dec 6, 1996		Actress and singer	Born in Chicago	
Amy Sedaris		Mar 29, 1961		Actress	Lived and worked in Chicago	
David Sedaris		Dec 26, 1956		Radio broadcaster and author		
Garry Shandling		Nov 29, 1949	Mar 24, 2016	Actor and comedian	Born in Chicago	
Sherri Shepherd		Apr 22, 1967		Actress and comedian	Born in Chicago	
Rondell Sheridan		Aug 15, 1958		Actor and comedian	Born in Chicago	
Kiernan Shipka		Nov 10, 1999		Actress	Born in Chicago	
Gary Sinise		Mar 17, 1955		Actor; co-founder of Steppenwolf Theatre Company	Born in Chicago suburb, Blue Island; lived and worked in Chicago	
John Stagliano		Nov 29, 1951		Adult film actor and director	Born in Chicago	
Todd Stashwick		Oct 16, 1968		Actor	Born in Chicago	
Kate Steinberg				Internet personality, television personality, and former NHL cheerleader	Born and lived in Chicago	
Michael Stoyanov		Dec 14, 1970		Actor	Born in Chicago	
Joe Swanberg		Aug 31, 1981		Film director and actor	Lives and works in Chicago	
Gloria Swanson		Mar 27, 1899	Apr 4, 1983	Actress	Born in Chicago	
Mr. T		May 21, 1952		Actor, evangelist	Born in Chicago	
Rea Tajiri				Filmmaker	Born in Chicago	
Larenz Tate		Sep 8, 1975		Actor	Born in Chicago	
Giorgio Tozzi		Jan 8, 1923	May 30, 2011	Singer and actor	Born in Chicago	
Sarah Truax		Feb 12, 1872	May 2, 1958	Broadway and Hollywood actress	Raised in Chicago	
Melvin Van Peebles		Aug 21, 1932	Sep 22, 2021	Director	Born in Chicago	
Vince Vaughn		Mar 28, 1970		Actor	Raised in Chicago suburbs, Buffalo Grove and Lake Forest; worked and lives in Chicago	
Matt Walsh		Oct 13, 1964		Comedian, co-founder of Upright Citizens Brigade	Born, lived and worked in Chicago	
Marsha Warfield		Mar 5, 1954		Actress and comedian	Born in Chicago	
Carol Wayne		Sep 6, 1942	Jan 13, 1985	Actress	Born in Chicago	
Jason Weaver		Jul 18, 1979		Actor and singer	Born in Chicago	
Raquel Welch		Sep 5, 1940	Feb 15, 2023	Actress	Born in Chicago	
Orson Welles		May 6, 1915	Oct 10, 1985	Actor, director, writer, and producer	Lived in Chicago	
George Wendt		Oct 17, 1948	May 20, 2025	Actor	Born, lived and worked in Chicago	
Steve Wilkos		Mar 9, 1964		Talk show host	Born in Chicago	
Robin Williams		Jul 21, 1951	Aug 11, 2014	Actor and comedian	Born in Chicago	
Oprah Winfrey		Jan 29, 1954		Talk show hostess, actress, entrepreneur, and philanthropist	Lived and worked in Chicago	
Beverly Wisniewski		March 19, 1946	Dec 24, 2007	Stand-up comedian and singer	Born in Chicago	
Robert Young		Feb 22, 1907	Jul 21, 1998	Actor	Born in Chicago	
Billy Zane		Feb 24, 1966		Actor	Born in Chicago	
Robert Zemeckis		May 14, 1951		Director, producer, and writer	Born in the Roseland neighborhood of Chicago	
Florenz Ziegfeld		Mar 21, 1867	Jul 22, 1932	Impresario	Born in Chicago	
Adrian Zmed		Mar 14, 1954		Actor	Born in Chicago	
Edward Zwick		Oct 8, 1952		Director, producer, and writer	Born in Chicago	

== Military ==
Name	Image	Birth	Death	Known for	Association	Reference
Robert E. Adamson		Dec 28, 1920	Jul 30, 2004	U.S. Navy vice admiral	Born in Chicago	
Russell A. Berg		Jan 6, 1917	Jan 24, 2002	U.S. Air Force brigadier general	Born in Chicago	
Camillo C. C. Carr		Mar 4, 1842	Jul 24, 1914	U.S. Army brigadier general	Raised in Chicago, retired in Chicago	
Wesley Clark		Dec 23, 1944		NATO's Supreme Allied Commander, four-star general, presidential candidate (2004)	Born in Chicago	
Richard E. Kraus		Nov 24, 1925	Oct 3, 1944	Marine Corps private first class; posthumously received the Medal of Honor during World War II	Born in Chicago	
Malcolm Ross O'Neill		Mar 25, 1940		Lieutenant general	Born in Chicago	
Joseph Polowsky		Oct 2, 1916	Oct 17, 1983	U.S. Army soldier during World War II; served as a translator between Soviet and American forces on Elbe Day; peace activist	Lived in Chicago	
Fred S. Robillard		Sep 14, 1890	Jan 31, 1971	Marine Corps major general; in charge of Marine Motor Transportation during World War II	Born in Chicago	
James A. Ryan		Oct 22, 1867	Jan 14, 1956	U.S. Army brigadier general; commanded World War I Officers' Training Centers at Fort Sheridan, later an executive with several Chicago-based businesses	Lived in Chicago	
William A. Ryan III		1972		U.S. Army major	Born in Chicago	
Scott Stearney		Oct 21, 1960	Dec 1, 2018	United States Navy vice admiral, commander of United States Fifth Fleet	Born in Chicago	
Harvey Walden IV		Dec 21, 1966		Marine Corps drill instructor	Born in Chicago	

== Politics and law ==
Name	Image	Birth	Death	Known for	Association	Reference
John Peter Altgeld		Dec 30, 1847	Mar 12, 1902	20th governor of Illinois	Hometown was Chicago	
John Ashcroft		May 9, 1942		U.S. attorney general	Born in Chicago	
Henry Moore Bates		Mar 30, 1869	Apr 15, 1949	Attorney	Born in Chicago	
Rod Blagojevich		Dec 10, 1956		Congressman; governor of Illinois	Born in Chicago	
James Bowler		Feb 5, 1875	Jul 18, 1957	Chicago alderman; U.S. congressman	Born in Chicago	
Frederick Van Ness Bradley		Apr 12, 1898	May 24, 1947	Politician from Michigan	Born in Chicago	
Lorenzo Brentano		Nov 4, 1813	Sep 18, 1891	Journalist and member of the U.S. House of Representatives	Lived and died in Chicago	
Theodore Brentano		Mar 29, 1854	Jul 2, 1940	Attorney, judge, and the first U.S. ambassador to Hungary	Lived and died in Chicago	
Bryant B. Brooks		Feb 5, 1861	Dec 8, 1944	Served in Wyoming's second state legislature; two terms as governor of Wyoming, 1905–1911	Lived in Chicago while attending business school	
Corinne Stubbs Brown		1848	1914	Marxist social activist	Born in Chicago	
Thomas Barbour Bryan		Dec 22, 1828	Jan 26, 1906	Commissioner of the District of Columbia and two-time Chicago mayoral nominee	Lived in Chicago	
Ellsworth B. Buck		Jul 3, 1892	Aug 14, 1970	U.S. congressman	Born in Chicago	
Jane Byrne		May 24, 1934	Nov 14, 2014	Mayor of Chicago	Born in Chicago	
Anton Cermak		May 9, 1873	Mar 6, 1933	Mayor of Chicago		
Enoch Chase		January 16, 1808	August 23, 1892	State senator in Wisconsin	Lived in Chicago	
Bernard J. Cigrand		Oct 1, 1866	May 16, 1932	"Father" of Flag Day in the United States	Lived in Chicago	
Hillary Clinton		Oct 26, 1947		First lady, US senator from NY, United States secretary of state	Born in Chicago, raised in suburban Park Ridge	
John Coughlin (aka "Bathhouse" John Coughlin)		Aug 15, 1860	Nov 11, 1938	Chicago alderman		
Timothy T. Cronin		Jun 27, 1884	Sep 20, 1955	U.S. attorney for the Eastern District of Wisconsin	Born in Chicago	
Richard J. Daley		May 15, 1902	Dec 20, 1976	Mayor of Chicago	Born in Chicago	
Richard M. Daley		Apr 24, 1942		Mayor of Chicago	Born in Chicago	
William M. Daley		Aug 9, 1948		White House chief of staff, secretary of commerce	Born in Chicago	
Clarence Darrow		Apr 18, 1857	Mar 13, 1938	Attorney and civil libertarian	Lived and died in Chicago	
Danny Davis		Sep 6, 1941		U.S. representative for Illinois, Cook County commissioner, Chicago city councilman	Lives in Chicago	
Paul Douglas		Mar 26, 1892	Sep 24, 1976	Chicago alderman, U.S. senator, and University of Chicago economist		
Stephen A. Douglas		Apr 23, 1813	Jun 3, 1861	U.S. senator, presidential candidate, noted for debating Abraham Lincoln	Lived and died in Chicago	
Edward Fitzsimmons Dunne		Oct 12, 1853	May 24, 1937	Governor of Illinois		
Rahm Emanuel		Nov 29, 1959		Former mayor of Chicago, White House chief of staff, US congressman	Lives in Chicago	
Scott Fitzgerald		Nov 16, 1963		U.S. representative for Wisconsin	Born in Chicago	
Thomas R. Fitzgerald		Jul 10, 1941	Nov 1, 2015	Retired chief justice of the Illinois Supreme Court	Born in Chicago	
Betty Ford		Apr 8, 1918	Jul 8, 2011	U.S. First Lady; wife of Gerald Ford	Born in Chicago	
Nick Fuentes		Aug 18, 1998		Political commentator	Born in Chicago	
Ruben Gallego		Nov 20, 1979		U.S. senator for Arizona	Born in Chicago	
Chuy García		Apr 12, 1956		U.S. representative for Illinois, Cook County commissioner, Illinois state senator, Chicago city councilor	Lives in Chicago	
Merrick Garland		Nov 13, 1952		Judge of the Court of Appeals for the District of Columbia Circuit and U.S. attorney general	Born in Chicago	
Bernhard Gettelman		Dec 23, 1889	Aug 30, 1965	State senator for Wisconsin	Born in Chicago	
John S. Gleason Jr.		Feb 11, 1915	May 2, 1993	6th administrator of Veterans Affairs (1961–65)	Born in Chicago	
Cindy Golding		1952		Iowa state representative	Born in Chicago	
Alexander R. Grant		Nov 28, 1925	Jul 22, 2001	State assemblyman for Wisconsin	Born in Chicago	
Luis Gutiérrez		Dec 10, 1953		First Latino to be elected to Congress from the Midwest	Born in Chicago	
Abraham Hamadeh		May 15, 1991		U.S. representative from Arizona	Born in Chicago	
John Marshall Harlan II		May 20, 1899	Dec 29, 1971	Supreme Court justice	Born in Chicago	
Paul P. Harris		Apr 19, 1868	Jan 27, 1947	Lawyer, founder of Rotary International		
Carter Harrison III		Feb 15, 1825	Oct 28, 1893	Mayor of Chicago		
Carter Harrison IV		Apr 23, 1860	Dec 25, 1953	Mayor of Chicago	Born in Chicago	
Paul B. Henry		Jul 9, 1942	Jul 31, 1993	Professor of Political Science and U.S. congressman	Born in Chicago	
Washington Hesing		May 4, 1849	Dec 17, 1897	Postmaster of Chicago and managing editor of the Illinois Staats-Zeitung	Lived and died in Chicago	
Jonathan Jackson		Jan 7, 1966		U.S. representative for Illinois	Born in Chicago	
Janet Jagan		Oct 20, 1920	Mar 28, 2009	Prime minister and president of Guyana	Born in Chicago	
Byron L. Johnson		Oct 12, 1917	Jan 6, 2000	Economist and U.S. representative from Colorado	Born in Chicago	
Sydney Kamlager-Dove		Jul 20, 1972		U.S. representative for California	Born in Chicago	
Peter Karađorđević		Feb 5, 1980		Hereditary prince of Yugoslavia	Born in Chicago	
Edward Joseph Kelly		Apr 17, 1933	Apr 15, 1947	36th mayor of Chicago	Born in Chicago	
Joe Kernan		Apr 8, 1946	Jul 29, 2020	48th governor of Indiana	Born in Chicago	
John C. Kluczynski		Feb 15, 1896	Jan 26, 1975	U.S. congressman	Born in Chicago, died in Chicago	
Bill Lipinski		Dec 22, 1937		U.S. congressman	Born in Chicago	
Boris Lushniak				Assistant surgeon general of the United States	Native of Chicago	
Lisa Madigan		Jul 30, 1966		Attorney general of Illinois	Born in Chicago	
Michael Madigan		Apr 19, 1942		67th and 69th speaker of Illinois House of Representatives	Born in Chicago	
Joseph Medill		Apr 6, 1823	Mar 16, 1899	Newspaper editor, mayor of Chicago		
John Gould Moyer		Jul 12, 1893	Jan 21, 1976	31st governor of American Samoa	Born in Chicago	
Eliot Ness		Apr 19, 1903	May 16, 1957	Federal agent; leader of the Untouchables; born in Chicago	Born in Chicago	
Barack Obama		Aug 4, 1961		U.S. senator and 44th president of the United States	Resided in Chicago 1983–2008	
Jay Obernolte		Aug 18, 1970		U.S. representative from California	Born in Chicago	
William B. Ogden		Jun 15, 1805	Aug 3, 1877	Entrepreneur and first mayor of Chicago		
Deval Patrick		Jul 31, 1956		Governor of Massachusetts	Born in Chicago	
John Podesta		Jan 8, 1949		White House chief of staff for President Bill Clinton (1998–2001)	Born in Chicago	
Roman Pucinski		May 13, 1919	Sep 25, 2002	U.S. congressman; Chicago alderman		
Mike Quigley		Oct 17, 1958		U.S. representative for Illinois, Cook County commissioner	Lives in Chicago	
Delia Ramirez		Jun 2, 1983		U.S. representative for Illinois	Born in Chicago	
Charles H. Ramsey		1950		Chicago Police deputy superintendent; current Philadelphia police commissioner	Native of Chicago	
Antonio R. Riley		Aug 22, 1963		State assemblyman for Wisconsin, Midwest regional administrator of the United States Department of Housing and Urban Development	Born in Chicago	
Grace Rohrer		Jun 14, 1924	Oct 12, 2011	North Carolina politician, arts and women's rights advocate; first female state cabinet-level secretary in North Carolina	Born in Chicago	
Louis C. Romell		Apr 7, 1899	Feb 5, 1987	State assemblyman for Wisconsin	Born in Chicago	
Jacky Rosen		Aug 2, 1957		U.S. senator for Nevada	Born in Chicago	
Donald Rumsfeld		Jul 9, 1932	Jun 29, 2021	U.S. congressman, secretary of Defense		
John Joseph Ryba		Aug 10, 1929	Jan 9, 2021	State assemblyman for Wisconsin	Born in Chicago	
Jan Schakowsky		May 26, 1944		U.S. representative for Illinois	Born in Chicago	
Jill Stein		May 14, 1950		Perennial candidate for the Green Party in presidential elections and member of the Lexington, Massachusetts town meeting	Born in Chicago	
Robert C. Strong		Sep 29, 1915	Dec 28, 1999	U.S. diplomat	Born in Chicago	
William Hale Thompson		May 14, 1869	Mar 19, 1944	Last Republican mayor of Chicago	Lived and died in Chicago	
Amos G. Throop		1811	1894	City treasurer; temperance advocate	Born in Chicago	
Jazep Varonka		Apr 4, 1891	Jun 4, 1952	First chairman of the People's Secretariat (i.e. prime minister) of the Belarusian National Republic	Lived and died in Chicago	
Tim Walberg		Apr 12, 1951		U.S. representative for Michigan	Born in Chicago	
Elihu B. Washburne		Sep 23, 1816	Oct 23, 1887	Secretary of state, minister to France	Lived and died in Chicago	
Harold Washington		Apr 15, 1922	Nov 25, 1987	First Black mayor of Chicago	Born in Chicago	
John Wentworth		Mar 5, 1815	Oct 16, 1888	U.S. congressman; mayor of Chicago	Lived and died in Chicago	
Joseph K. Wood				Chair of the Republican Party of Arkansas	Grew up in Jeffery Manor	
Francis Parker Yockey		Sep 18, 1917	Jun 16, 1960	Political theorist and philosopher	Born in Chicago	

== Religion ==
Name	Image	Birth	Death	Known for	Association	Reference
John Ankerberg		Dec 10, 1945		Christian television host, author, speaker	Born in Chicago	
Awa III		Jul 4, 1975		122nd Catholicos-Patriarch of the Assyrian Church of the East	Born in Chicago and attended Loyola University Chicago	
Juanita Bynum		Jan 16, 1959		Gospel singer, author, pastor	Born in Chicago	
Frances Xavier Cabrini (aka Mother Cabrini)		Jul 15, 1850	Dec 22, 1917	First citizen of the US to be canonized by the Roman Catholic Church	Lived and died in Chicago	
Mircea Eliade		Mar 13, 1907	Apr 22, 1986	Religious scholar and philosopher from Romania	Lived and died in Chicago	
Mordecai Ham		Apr 2, 1877	Nov 1, 1961	20th-century evangelist		
Jesse Jackson		Oct 8, 1941		Minister, civil rights activist, presidential candidate	Studied at Chicago Theological Seminary, engaged in Chicago-based civil rights work (e.g. Operation Breadbasket, Rainbow/PUSH)	
Anton LaVey (born Howard Stanton Levey)		Apr 11, 1930	Oct 29, 1997	Writer of The Satanic Bible; founder of The Church of Satan	Born in Chicago	
Pope Leo XIV		Sep 14, 1955		Born Robert Francis Prevost; first pope from North America and from the United States	Born and raised in Chicago through elementary school; attended Catholic Theological Union for Masters of Divinity	
James Patterson Lyke		Feb 18, 1939	Dec 27, 1992	Franciscan friar and Roman Catholic bishop	Born in Chicago	
Jacques Marquette		Jun 1, 1637	May 18, 1675	Missionary		
Danya Ruttenberg		Feb 6, 1975		Jewish feminist rabbi and author		
Jeff Seidel		1957		Orthodox Judaism outreach worker in Jerusalem, director of the Jewish Student Information Center	Born in Chicago	
Winifred O. Whelan		Mar 5, 1931		Catholic sister, writer, academic, and Wikipedian	Born and lives in Chicago	

== See also ==
- List of people from Illinois
