= Gertrude Potter Daniels =

American novelist (1876–1940)

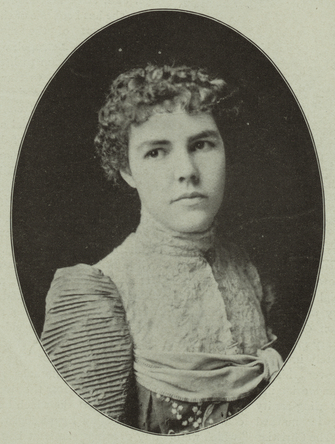
- (1901)
- Born: September 20, 1876; Chicago, Illinois, U.S.
- Died: July 12, 1940; Pasadena, California, U.S.
- Occupation: Writer
- Spouses: F. Lee Rust (annulled); Julius Clarke Daniels
- Father: Orrin Woodward Potter
- Relatives: Margaret Horton Potter (sister)

Gertrude Potter Daniels (September 20, 1876 – July 12, 1940) was an American novelist.

== Early life and education ==
She was the daughter of steel magnate Orrin Woodward Potter. Her sister, Margaret Horton Potter, also became a novelist.

== Career ==
Her novel Halamar (1900) was about an actress who marries into a wealthy New England family.

Her novel The Warners (1901) centers on Cyrus Warner, an orphan who works his way up to owning an oil well, but is pressured by monopolistic magnates. The novel also focuses on poor working conditions, as well as a married pair of anarchists, Kirby and Ira Fisher, the latter modeled on Emma Goldman. Kirby throws a bomb at a demonstration, aiming at police but instead killing his own wife and child.

Her novel Eshek the Oppressor (1902) focuses on oil monopolies. It was withdrawn by the publisher shortly after publication, officially to fix typographical errors, but news reports claim it was due to the "socialistic character" of the novel.

== Personal life ==
In 1890, she married F. Lee Rust, but that marriage was annulled. She then married Julius Clarke Daniels.

Gertrude Potter Daniels died on July 12, 1940, age 63, in Pasadena, California.

== Bibliography ==
- Halamar. Chicago: G. M. Hill, 1900.
- The Warners: An American Story of Today. Chicago: Jamieson-Higgins, 1901.
- Eshek the Oppressor. Chicago: Rand McNally, 1902.

== See also ==
- List of American novelists
- List of people from Chicago
- List of people from Pasadena, California
- List of women writers
