= James L. Powell =

American geologist and writer (born 1936)

James Lawrence Powell
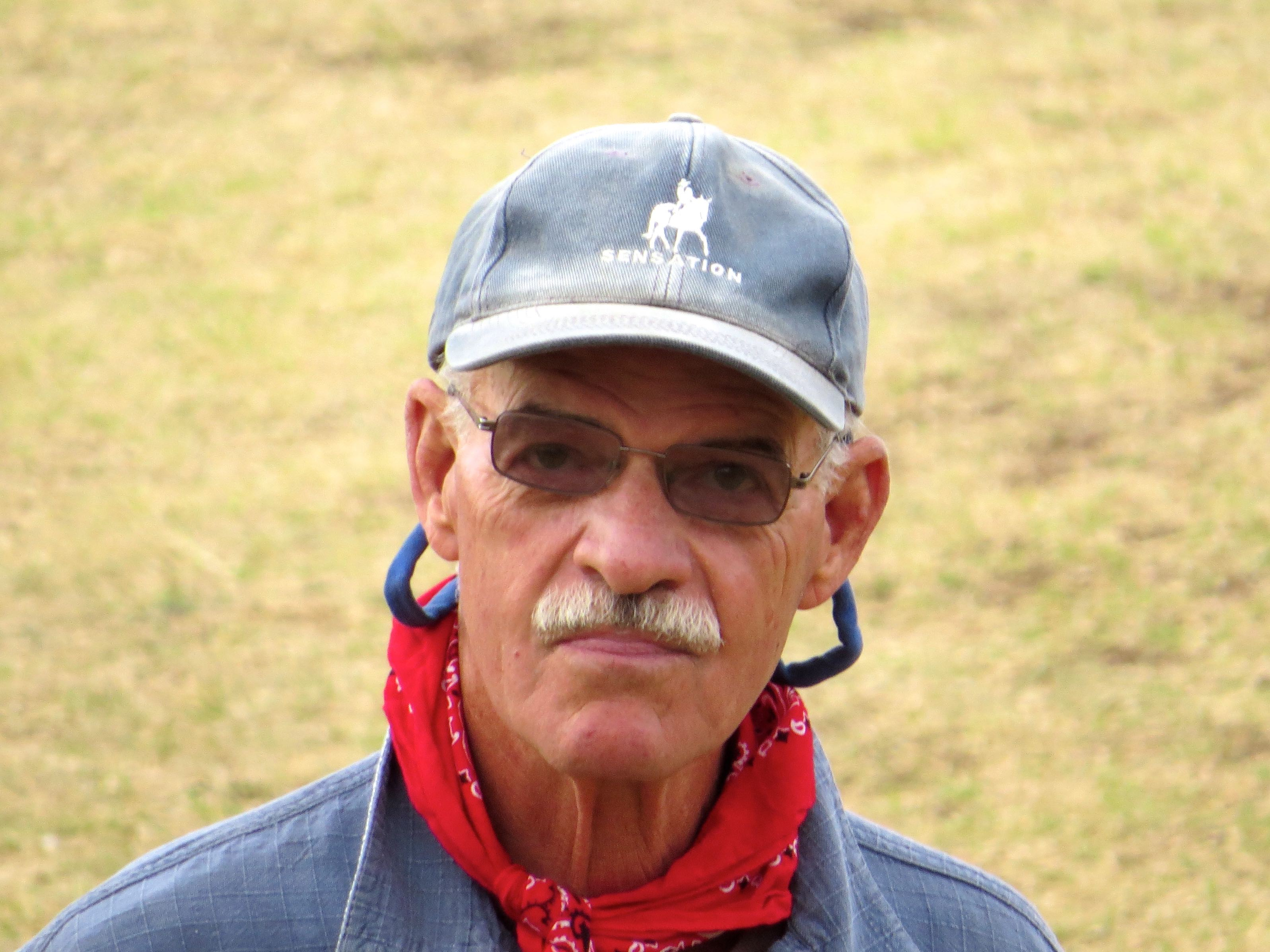

13th President of Franklin & Marshall College
- In office 1983-1988
- Preceded by: Keith Spalding
- Succeeded by: Richard Kneedler

Personal details
- Born: July 17, 1936 (age 90) Berea, Kentucky
- Education: Berea College; Massachusetts Institute of Technology

Academic background
- Thesis: The strontium isotopic composition and origin of carbonatites (1962)

Academic work
- Discipline: Geology
- Institutions: Oberlin College; Reed College; Franklin & Marshall College

James Lawrence Powell (born July 17, 1936) is an American geologist, writer, former college president and museum director. He chaired the geology department at Oberlin College later serving as its provost and president. Powell also served as president of Franklin & Marshall College as well as Reed College. Following his positions in higher education, Powell presided over the Franklin Institute and the Natural History Museum of Los Angeles.

Powell served 12 years on the National Science Board and recently retired as executive director of Graduate Fellowships for Science, Technology, Engineering, and Mathematics Diversity.

His book, Night Comes to the Cretaceous, explores the scientific debate regarding dinosaur extinction. In Four Revolutions in the Earth Sciences, Powell addresses dinosaur extinction in addition to three other scientific debates: deep time, continental drift and global warming.

Powell has posited that the scientific consensus on global warming nears universality and he actively counters climate change denialism in his research and other publications.

== Education ==
Powell earned a BA degree in 1958 from Berea College, a private liberal arts college located in Powell's home town of Berea, Kentucky. Powell then received a PhD in Geochemistry from the Massachusetts Institute of Technology in 1962.

== Career ==
Powell began his career at Oberlin College in 1962 where he held the position of chair of the geology department from 1965 to 1973. He became the associate dean of arts and science in 1973, then vice president and provost in 1975. After serving two years as a visiting administrator at Stanford University, Powell returned to Oberlin to serve as its acting president from 1981 to 1983.

Following a 20-year career at Oberlin, Powell served as president of Franklin and Marshall College from 1983 to 1988, then president of Reed College from 1988 to 1991. Powell left academia to preside over the Franklin Institute (1991–1994) followed by the National History Museum of Los Angeles (1994–2001). Since 2001, Powell has been serving as the executive director of the National Physical Science Consortium.

Powell served 12 years on the National Science Board first appointed by Ronald Reagan in 1986 and serving as its vice chair in 1990.

== Committee for Skeptical Inquiry ==
In 2015, Powell was named a fellow for the Committee for Skeptical Inquiry. He resigned in March 2022 in protest against the publication of an article in Skeptical Inquirer by CSI fellow Mark Boslough regarding the Bunch et al. Tall el-Hammam airburst paper,, which had been based on research funded by the Comet Research Group (CRG) and authored primarily by its members. He stated that it "violates nearly every tenet of proper skepticism" as defined by CSICOP and CSI, citing CSI-co-founder and executive council member Ray Hyman.

On February 15, 2023, the following editor's note was posted on the Bunch et al. paper: "Readers are alerted that concerns raised about the data presented and the conclusions of this article are being considered by the Editors. A further editorial response will follow the resolution of these issues." On April 24, 2025, Nature issued a formal retraction note, citing concerns about methodology, analysis, and data interpretation. Also on April 24, 2025, an expanded version with the same title was submitted to the Comet Research Group journal “Airbursts and Cratering Impacts”, for which Powell serves as co-editor. It was accepted for publication on May 4, 2025.

== Debate on climate change consensus ==
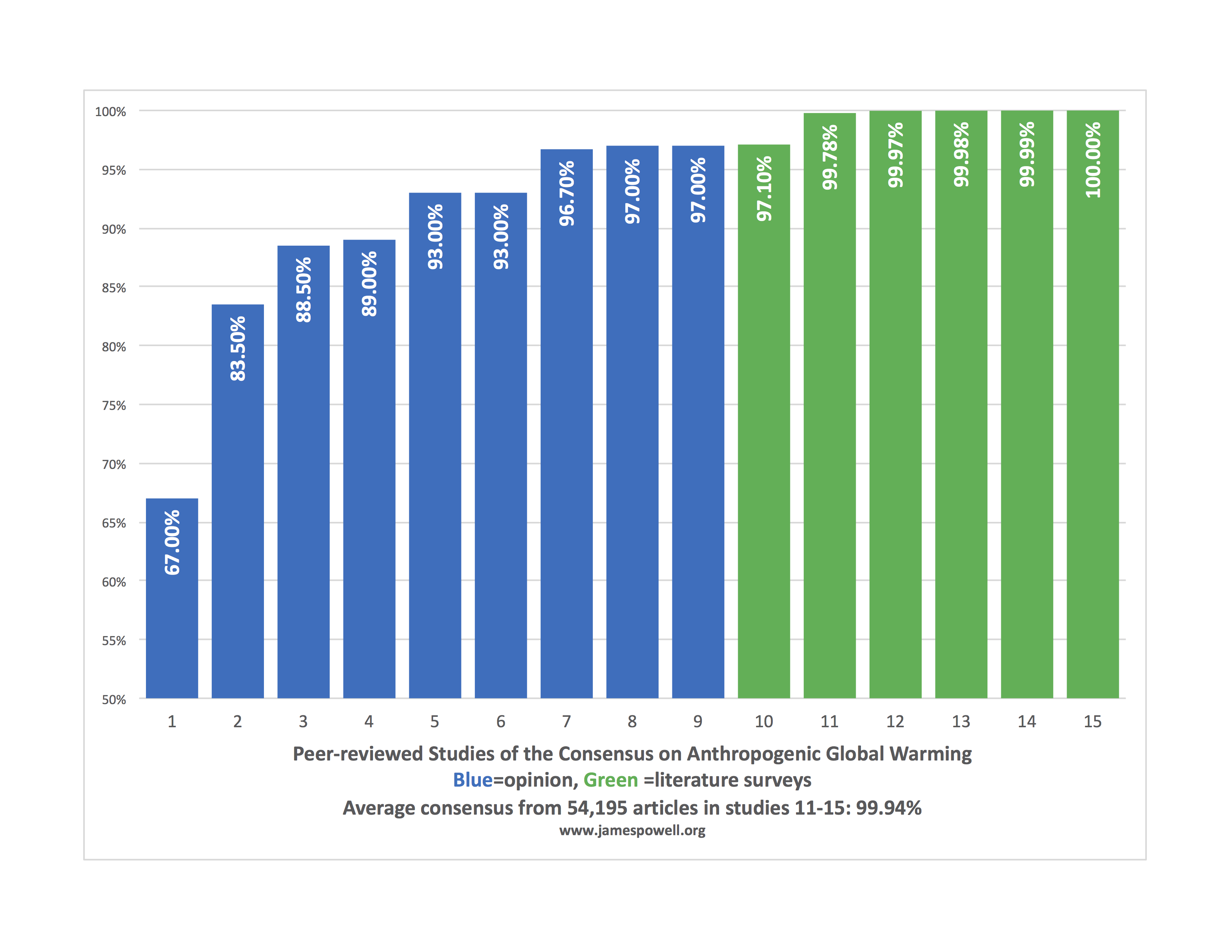
Early peer-reviewed studies of the consensus on anthropogenic global warming

Scientific consensus on causation: Academic studies of scientific agreement on human-caused global warming among climate experts (2010–2015) reflect that the level of consensus correlates with expertise in climate science. A 2019 study found scientific consensus to be at 100%, and a 2021 study concluded that consensus exceeded 99%. Another 2021 study found that 98.7% of climate experts indicated that the Earth is getting warmer mostly because of human activity.

Powell has researched the scientific consensus view of anthropogenic global warming (AGW) in a series of studies evaluating the peer-reviewed literature. In 2012, Powell reviewed 13,950 peer-reviewed publications between 1991 and 2012 with "global warming" or "global climate change" as keywords. Evaluating this dataset, Powell showed a 99.97% scientific consensus view supporting AGW. In 2016, Powell duplicated this method on articles published during 2013 and 2014. In this set, Powell found a 99.99% consensus "verging on unanimity" by the scientific community.

While agreeing that the consensus on AGW is high, other scientists argued ca 2010-2013 that the consensus is closer to 97%. The debate centers around the selection of scientific papers identified as supporting AGW and therefore included in the study. For example, in their 2013 study, Cook et al. excluded 66.4% of the papers examined because the abstracts did not endorse AGW either explicitly or implicitly. Powell reviewed the abstracts of hundreds of articles on plate tectonics, evolution, and impact cratering to show that scientists almost never directly affirm the ruling paradigm of their discipline. On that basis, Powell included papers in the study as long as the abstracts did not explicitly reject AGW.

Powell has further argued that the extent of the scientific consensus is important. In The Consensus on Anthropogenic Warming Matters Powell argues that the "stronger the public believe the consensus to be, the more they support the action on global warming that human society so desperately needs." This metastudy included 54,195 publications from five earlier studies by Powell and others demonstrating that the scientific consensus on AGW is 99.94%.

In November 2019, Powell published "Scientists Reach 100% Consensus on Anthropogenic Global Warming." He reviewed over 11,600 peer-reviewed articles published in the first seven months of 2019 but found none that rejected anthropogenic global warming.

== Views and scientific activism ==
Powell has encouraged scientists to do more than publish in scientific journals. "I think it's time for scientists to get up from the lab bench and speak out." Concerning the consequences of global warming, Powell said: "I want my grandchildren to be able to say... he did something. He tried to do something."

There is no scientific debate regarding the existence of AGW according to Powell. Through his research and other publications Powell has criticized politicians and others who defy the scientific consensus by denying AGW.

In a 2014 editorial, Powell urged the university presidents of Brown University and Harvard University to change course by divesting their institutions from fossil fuels. A New York Times editorial co-authored by Powell and Michael E. Mann recommended that the American Museum of Natural History remove Rebekah Mercer from their board as her family foundation supported climate change denialism.

In a self-published 2020 book, Powell defended the controversial Younger Dryas impact hypothesis which has been rejected by the mainstream scientific community. In 2022 he published a paper in the journal Scientific Progress, writing that this scientific rejection was premature. His concerns have been critiqued in a comprehensive review of the literature on this subject.

== Recognition ==
Powell is the recipient of several honorary degrees. Oberlin College awarded Powell an honorary doctorate of science in 1983. The Tohoku Gakuin University of Japan honored Powell with a Doctor of Humane Letters in 1986. Beaver College and Berea College (his alma mater) have also honored Powell with honorary degrees.

The minor planet, 9739 Powell, discovered by Carolyn Shoemaker, was named for Powell in 1987.

== Books ==
- Powell, James Lawrence (1998). Night Comes to the Cretaceous: Dinosaur Extinction and the Transformation of Modern Geology. W.H. Freeman. ISBN 0-7167-3117-7.
- Powell, James Lawrence (2006). Grand Canyon: Solving Earth's Grandest Puzzle. Penguin Group (USA) Incorporated. ISBN 0-452-28787-1.
- Powell, James Lawrence (2008). Dead Pool: Lake Powell, Global Warming, and the Future of Water in the West. Berkeley, CA: University of California Press. ISBN 978-0-520-25477-0.
- Powell, James Lawrence (2011). The Inquisition of Climate Science]. Columbia University Press. ISBN 978-0-231-52784-2.
- Powell, James Lawrence (2011b). 2084: An Oral History of the Great Warming. J.L. Powell. OCLC 958939329.
- Powell, James Lawrence (2014). Four Revolutions in the Earth Sciences: From Heresy to Truth. Columbia University Press. ISBN 978-0-231-53845-9.
- Scott, Thomas R.; Powell, James L. (2018). The Universe as it Really Is: Earth, Space, Matter, and Time. Columbia University Press. ISBN 978-0-231-18494-6.
- Powell, James Lawrence (2020). Deadly Voyager: The Ancient Comet Strike that Changed Earth and Human History. James Lawrence Powell. ISBN 978-0-578-66677-8. (Amazon Kindle book)
- Powell, James Lawrence (2023). Unlocking the Moon's Secrets: From Galileo to Giant Impact. Oxford University Press. ISBN 978-0197694862.
