= Richard Kneedler =

14th President of Franklin & Marshall College
- In office 1988-2002
- Preceded by: James Lawrence Powell
- Succeeded by: John Anderson Fry

Interim President of Wilson College
- In office 2019

Interim President of Rockford College
- In office 2006-2008

Personal details
- Born: 1943 (age 82–83) Pittsburgh, Pennsylvania
- Education: Franklin & Marshall College (BA); University of Pennsylvania (MA, PhD)
- Occupation: Professor

Academic background
- Thesis: Homo viator: the use of the travel motif in eighteenth-century French prose fiction (1970)

Academic work
- Discipline: French studies
- Institutions: Franklin & Marshall College; Temple University; Rockford College; Wilson College

Alvin Richard Kneedler (born 1943) is President Emeritus of Franklin & Marshall College. From 2005-2006 he served as chairman of the Pennsylvania Governor's Commission on Training America's Teachers. From 2006-2008, he served as interim president of Rockford College. He served as Interim President of Wilson College in 2019.

== Early life ==
Born in Pittsburgh, Pennsylvania, Alvin Richard Kneedler earned his A.B. from Franklin & Marshall in 1965 as a College Scholar specializing in French. He holds an M.A. (1967) and a Ph. D. (1970) in French Language and Literature from the University of Pennsylvania. His doctoral dissertation, Homo viator: the use of the travel motif in eighteenth-century French prose fiction, dealt with French prose fiction. He also has a certificate in Higher Education Administration from the Institute for Educational Management at the Harvard University Graduate School of Business Administration (1975). He was awarded honorary doctorates by Tohoku Gakuin University in Sendai, Japan (1963), by Franklin & Marshall (2002) and by Wilson College (2021). He is a member of Phi Beta Kappa and Phi Kappa Tau.

== Academic career ==
Dr. Kneedler began his teaching career at Franklin & Marshall, where he was appointed Instructor in French in 1968 and Assistant Professor of French in 1969. He also taught in the Temple University Graduate Education Program for Teachers in Harrisburg 1969-71. He began his career in administration with his appointment in 1971 as Assistant to John Vanderzell, Dean of the College at Franklin & Marshall. He subsequently held appointments as Assistant to President Keith Spalding, Secretary of the College, Administrative Vice President, Vice President for Administration, and Vice President for Development, as well as serving as Secretary of the College's Board of Visitors and the College's Board of Trustees. He served as Franklin & Marshall's President from 1988 until 2002.

In recognition for his service to Franklin & Marshall College, a plaque was dedicated to him in 2015.
