= Daniella Ohad =

American design historian

- דניאלה אוהד
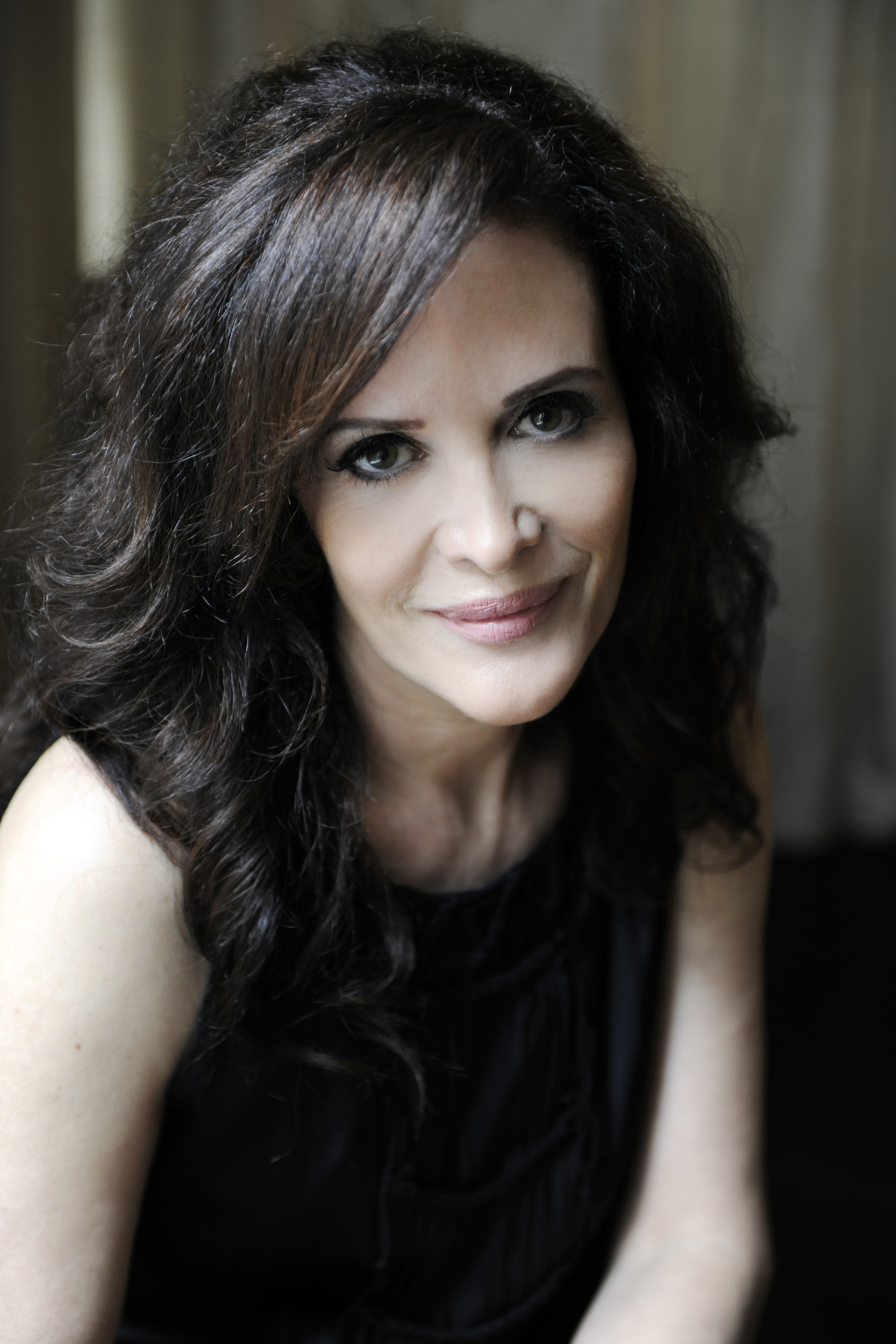
- Born: Israel
- Education: Tel Aviv University (BA); Fashion Institute of Technology (MA); Bard Graduate Center (PhD)
- Occupations: Design Historian, Critic, Education
- Children: 2
- Parent: Ruben Ohad (father)
Daniella Ohad
- Allegiance: Israel Defense Forces
- Branch: Military Intelligence Directorate
- Rank: Sergeant
- Website: daniellaondesign.com

Daniella Ohad (Hebrew: דניאלה אוהד) is an American-Israeli design historian, educator, writer, and influencer. She teaches history of design, material culture, design connoisseurship, and design culture at Parsons School of Design and New York School of Interior Design in New York City. Ohad has curated and moderated educational talks and panels at Design Miami, the Museum of Arts and Design, the Cooper Hewitt, Smithsonian Design Museum, 92nd Street Y, AIA New York | Center for Architecture, the New York School of Interior Design, and Sotheby's. Her articles and essays have been published in academic journals and magazines, she has hosted a talk show on design and architecture, created documentaries, and curated private design collections. Her essay Hotel Design in British Mandate Palestine: Modernism and the Zionist Vision received a special mention from the jury of the Premio Bruno Zevi in 2010.

== Early life and education ==
Ohad was born and raised in Hod HaSharon, Israel to a Zionist family. She comes from the Feuchtwanger family, whose family tree and genealogy dates back to 18th-century Germany. Her great uncle Lion Feuchtwanger was the German Jewish novelist and playwright. Her uncle, Michael Ohad was the music and theater critic of Haaretz, director, journalist, and author. Her father, horticulturist Ruben Ohad pioneered the subtropical fruits industry in Israel, after bringing it from California in the 1950s. His cousin, historian Edgar Feuchtwanger, published the book Hitler, my Neighbor: Memories of a Jewish Childhood, 1929-1939.

Ohad graduated from Katzenelson High School in Kfar Saba, served in the Military Intelligence Directorate, and achieved the rank of sergeant. After her service, she attended Tel Aviv University, where she received BA degree in Art History and Philosophy. In 1985, she moved to New York, received Master's degree in Museum Studies: Decorative Arts from the Fashion Institute of Technology, and PhD from Bard Graduate Center. Under the advisory of Amy Ogata and Derek E. Ostergard, she submitted her doctoral dissertation, Hotel Design in Zionist Palestine: Modernism, Tourism, and Nationalism, 1917-1948 in 2006. A part of it was published as an essay in the Journal of Israeli History.

== Career ==
From 2000 to 2010, Daniella Ohad taught at Parsons School of Design, where she was responsible for the design history curriculum within the architecture, interior design, and lighting department. Her teaching approach emphasized connections between design history, contemporary scholarship, and modern practice.

Beginning in 2010, she taught at the New York School of Interior Design. Her work there included developing academic focus on design collecting as a field of study, coinciding with increased market and institutional interest in collectible design objects. Ohad's writings and commentary on design collecting and education have been cited in publications covering the design market.

In 2017, Ohad began hosting the talk shows Harvest Dialogues and Spring Dialogues, which focused on discussions of current issues in design and architecture. She has moderated public talks, curated events and exhibitions, appeared on television programs, and served on boards and acquisition committees related to art fairs and public institutions.

Ohad has written reviews and conducted interviews on design, architecture and contemporary culture for the Journal of Interior Design, Interior Design Magazine, The Journal of Israeli History, West 86th, and Modern Magazine.

Ohad produced a series of four documentaries on design connoisseurship, focusing on George Nakashima, Paul Evans, Frank Lloyd Wright, and Charlotte Perriand.

== Publications ==
- Ohad Smith, Daniella (March 2011), "DECODENCE: Legendary Interiors and Illustrious Travelers aboard the SS Normandie: Exhibition Review", Interiors: Design, Architecture, Culture, 2 (1): 128–131, doi:10.2752/204191211x12980384100274, S2CID 194098328
- Ohad Smith, Daniella (September 2008), "T.H. Robsjohn-Gibbings: Crafting a Modern Home for Postwar America", Journal of Interior Design, 34 (1): 39–55, doi:10.1111/j.1939-1668.2008.00005.x
- Ohad Smith, Daniella (2010), "Hotel Design in British Mandate Palestine: Modernism and the Zionist Vision", Journal of Israel History, 29 (1): 99–123, doi:10.1080/13531041003595035, S2CID 67838408
- Ohad Smith, Daniella (March, 2013), "The 'Designed' Israeli Interior, 1960-1977: Crafting Identity", Journal of Interior Design, 38 (3): 21–36.
