= Florence Kirsch Du Brul =

Florence Kirsch Du Brul (1915 – July 2, 2005) was a concert pianist and master piano teacher and member of Chicago society in the mid-20th century.

== Early life ==
Born on the North Side of Chicago in 1915, Florence Kirsch as a little girl studied with master pianist Silvio Scionti and composer Howard Wells, and performed with the Chicago Symphony Orchestra at age 12. The CSO's conductor, Frederick Stock, recommended her to the great Austrian classical pianist and composer Artur Schnabel, and Kirsch was sent to Berlin, Germany, where Schnabel was living, so she could study with the great master during her teenage years.

After the Nazis came to power, Kirsch was denied permission to leave Germany, and so was forced to escape to Italy, leaving all her possessions behind.

== Career and adult life ==
Kirsch returned to the United States in 1937, and made her professional debut in Chicago's Orchestra Hall that year. She became a classical concert pianist, and performed on several classical records, including neo-classic Swiss composer Ernest Bloch’s Voice in the Wilderness, and Russian composer Igor Stravinsky’s Les Noces.

Living in New York City in the 1940s while performing and teaching, she met and married Dr. E. Lloyd Du Brul, an anatomist, physical anthropologist, and educator. After Dr. Du Brul served in General George Patton’s Third Army in World War II, he received a faculty appointment at the University of Illinois at Chicago College of Dentistry.

The couple purchased a 19th century home in Lincoln Park, Chicago and filled it with art, sculpture, native handicrafts, and other memorabilia from their many trips abroad. The couple were known for throwing large parties at their home.

“To dine at the Du Bruls’ home was a feast for the palate and for the eyes in the presentation of dinner,” said Dr. Thomas Lakars, Assistant Professor of Oral Biology. “To have visited the Du Bruls’ home for a garden party or for dinner at their banquet table was a treat never to be forgotten.”

== Later life and death ==
Throughout her life, Du Brul traveled around the world lecturing about piano and teaching master classes, where she collaborated with and/or taught several notable pianists, such as Lucia Barrenechea of Brazil and the late Donald Walker, Professor of Piano at Northern Illinois University. Even in her later years, Du Brul taught piano at Northwestern University and performed on WFMT-FM Radio in Chicago. At the time of her death, Du Brul continued to hold Emeritus Professor status at the Music Institute of Chicago. Mrs. Du Brul also enjoyed gardening and raising standard poodles.

Du Brul and her husband donated their collection of human, animal, and prehistoric skeletal artifacts, prepared for teaching graduate-level oral anatomy, to the College in 1996. “It’s an absolutely amazing collection,” said Dr. Anne Grauer of the Loyola University Chicago Department of Anthropology. “An outstanding resource for teaching and research.” In 2004, the college dedicated a new Du Brul Archives of Oral Anatomy to house the collection.

After Lloyd's death in 1996, she set up the ‘’Du Brul Scholars Fund” at University of Illinois at Chicago.

Florence Kirsch Du Brul died on July 2, 2005.
