= Bard Graduate Center =

Graduate research institute and gallery

Coordinates: 40°47′9″N 73°58′16.6″W

The Bard Graduate Center: Decorative Arts, Design History, Material Culture
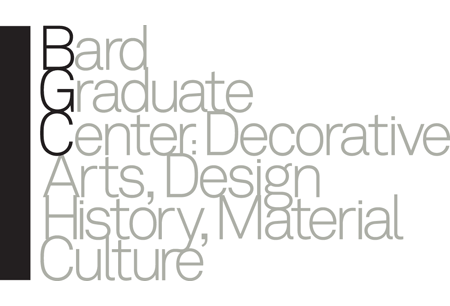
- Type: Graduate School
- Established: 1993
- Affiliations: Bard College
- Director: Susan Weber
- Location: 38 West 86th Street; New York, NY; United States, New York, New York, United States
- Campus: Urban
- Website: www.bgc.bard.edu

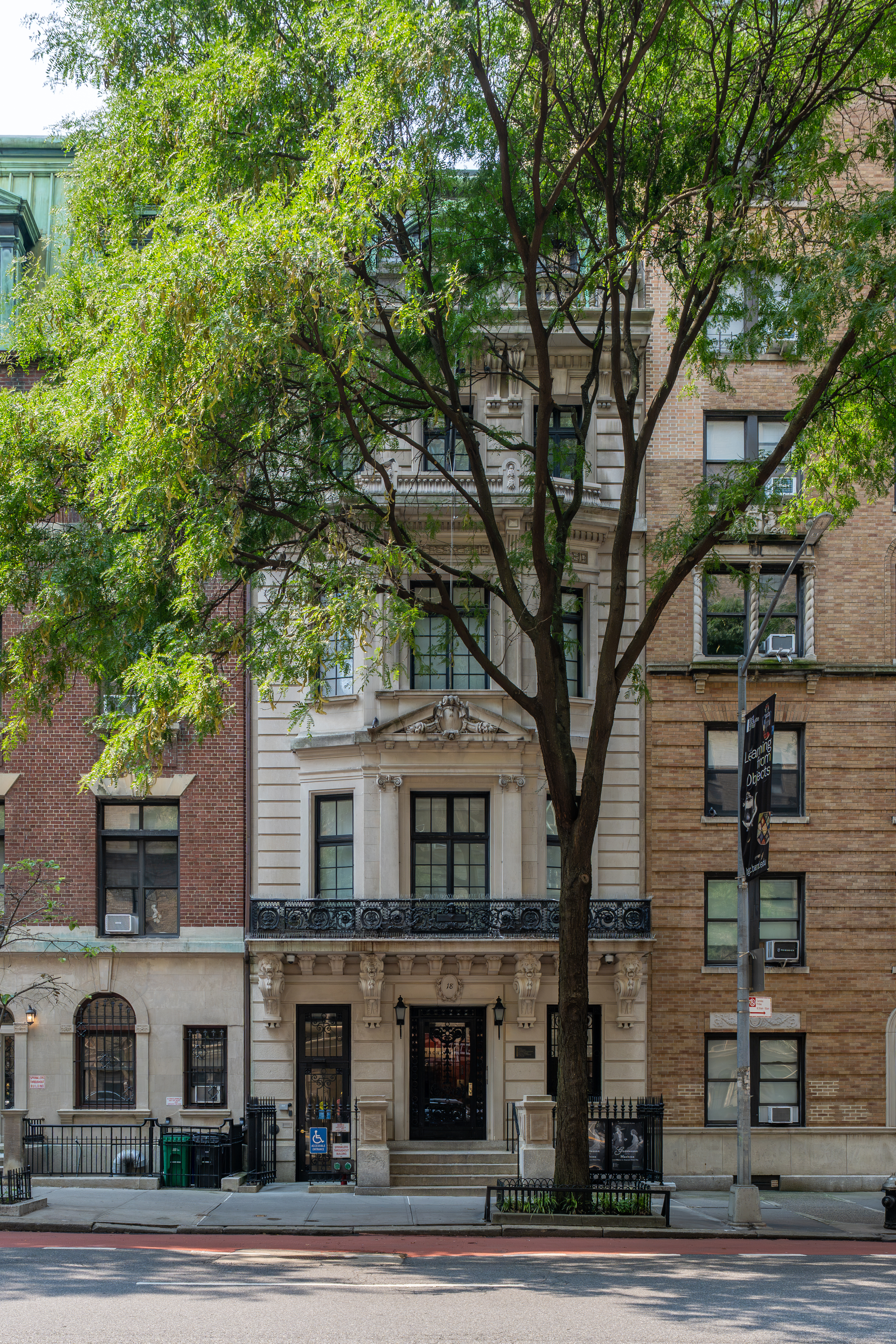
Bard Graduate Center Gallery, 18 West 86th Street

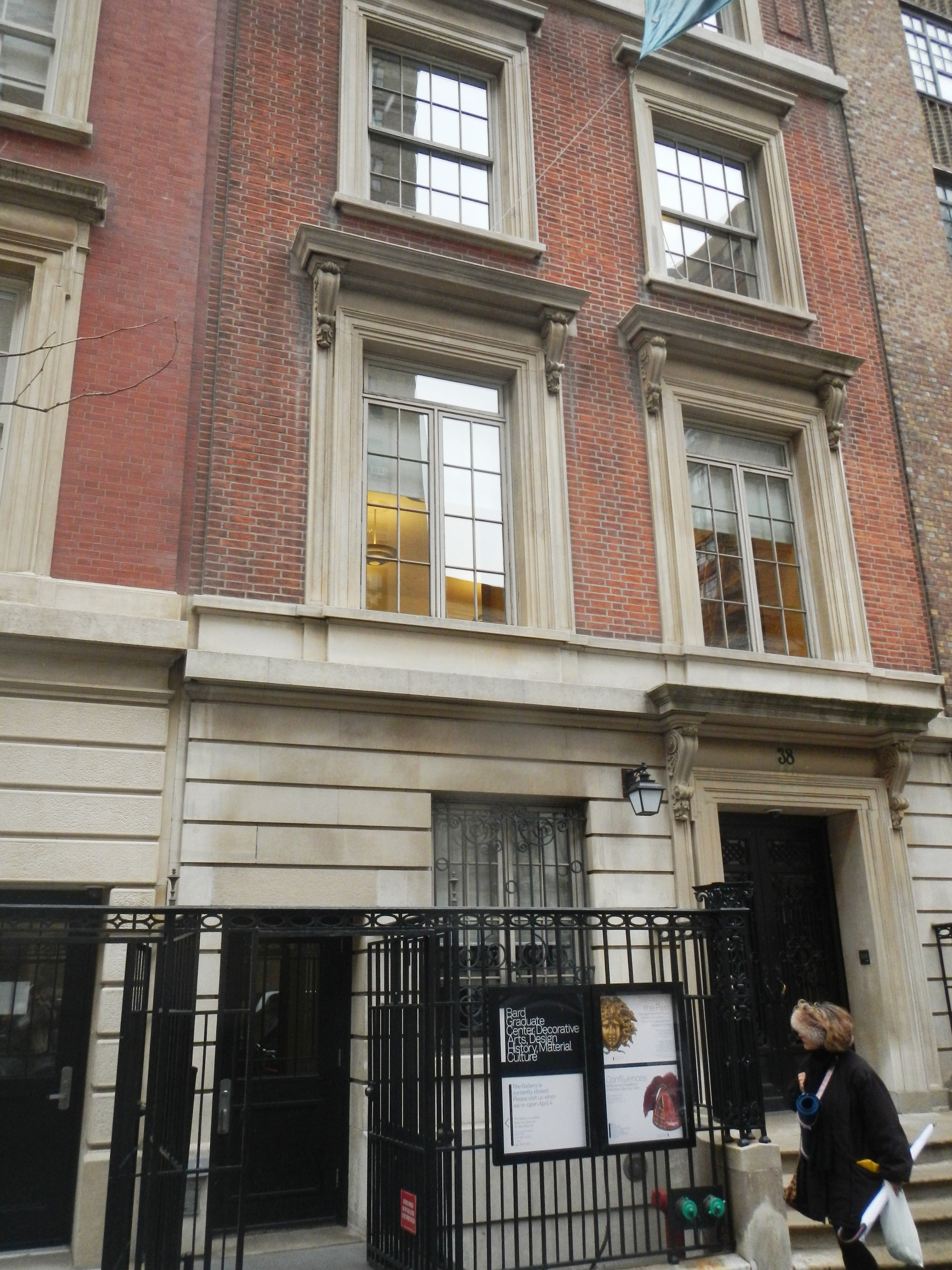
38 West 86th Street

The Bard Graduate Center: Decorative Arts, Design History, Material Culture is a graduate research institute and gallery located in New York City. It is affiliated with Bard College, located in Annandale-on-Hudson, New York. The gallery occupies a six-story townhouse at 18 West 86th Street while the academic building and library are located at 38 West 86th Street.

Students at Bard Graduate Center focus on the study of the cultural history of the material world.

== Programs ==
Bard Graduate Center offers two programs of study, one leading to a Masters of Arts degree and the other to a Doctor of Philosophy degree. Students in these programs can select courses dealing with various aspects of the cultural history of the material world. Bard Graduate Center also has a Gallery presenting regular exhibitions relating to the history of the decorative arts, design and material culture, as well as Focus Project exhibitions, small-scale academically rigorous exhibitions and publications that are developed and executed by Bard Graduate Center faculty and postdoctoral fellows in collaboration with students in the MA and PhD programs.

Students in the MA and PhD programs take the same courses. The curriculum for the master's degree includes a number of required courses, tutorials, independent studies, travel, and internships.

Students otherwise construct their own program of study. The BGC is known for its focus on New York and American Material Culture; History and Theory of Museums; Modern Design History; Early Modern Europe; and Comparative Medieval Material Culture (China, Islam, Europe).

== Teaching ==
In addition to formal classes, Bard Graduate Center runs a series of evening colloquia designed to function in a kind of polyphony with the "for credit" course offerings. Regular evening seminars, which are open to the academic public, serve as foci. In addition, the History and Theory of Museums program brings in speakers affiliated with current exhibitions, and the Medieval, Renaissance, and Early Modern Europe group cosponsors two annual events with the Columbia University interdepartmental group on Medieval and Renaissance studies.

The endowed lecture series bring in a regular sequence of speakers on eighteenth- and nineteenth-century France and on the history of glass. Every May the BGC participates, as the founding organizer, in the Consortium for American Material Culture, along with Yale University, Boston University, the University of Delaware, the University of Wisconsin—Madison, the Smithsonian Institution, and our local partners at the Metropolitan Museum of Art and the New-York Historical Society.

The hands-on examination of objects is an essential feature of study at Bard Graduate Center. Incorporated into the first-year Survey of the Decorative Arts, Design History, and Material Culture course are "Materials Days," events that focus on the making of things, so that students can experience materiality from the maker's perspective.

== Exhibitions ==
Bard Graduate Center Gallery present exhibitions and a broad range of exhibition-related programs including exhibition lectures, curatorial conversations, gallery talks, films, and exhibition catalogues devoted to enhancing knowledge and awareness of the material world.

== Notable alumni ==
Notable graduates of the Bard Graduate Centre include:

- Grace Jeffers, design educator - Master's degree in history of decorative arts (1996)
- Sarah Archer, curator and writer - Master's degree in Decorative Arts, Design History, Material Culture (2006)
- Daniella Ohad Smith, design historian and writer - PhD
