= Kennedy J. Reed =

American theoretical atomic physicist (1944–2023)

- Born: May 24, 1944; Memphis, Tennessee, U.S.
- Died: June 20, 2023 (aged 79)
- Education: Monmouth College (B.S., 1967); University of Wisconsin-Superior (M.S.T., 1971); University of Nebraska–Lincoln (Ph.D., 1976)
- Known for: Collision theory
- Awards: John Wheatley Award (2003); Presidential Award (2009); Fellow of the American Physical Society
- Scientific career
- Fields: Physics
- Workplaces: Lawrence Livermore National Laboratory; Morehouse College

Kennedy J. Reed (May 24, 1944 – June 20, 2023) was an American theoretical atomic physicist in the Theory Group in the Physics & Advanced Technologies Directorate at Lawrence Livermore National Laboratory (LLNL) and a founder of the National Physical Science Consortium (NPSC), a group of about 30 universities that provides physics fellowships for women and minorities.

Reed earned his Ph.D. at the University of Nebraska–Lincoln, was a professor of physics at Morehouse College, in Atlanta, Georgia and is known for his work related to ionization and atomic collisions in high temperature plasmas. In his career, he published more than 100 papers.

Demonstrating a commitment to improving the participation of minority and female students in the physical sciences, Dr. Reed helped more than 100 such students to earn their doctorates and, through the NPSC consortium, awarded over 300 graduate fellowships.

== Life and education ==
Kennedy J. Reed was born on May 24, 1944, in Memphis, Tennessee to Earl Reed Sr. and Lula B. Reed (née McClain). He grew up with 5 siblings: Juan, Garland, Margaret, Lynn, and Oye. He later moved to Chicago, Illinois, growing up in the Ida B. Wells public housing of the south side of the city. He attended James R. Doolittle Jr. Grammar School and graduated from Tilden Technical High School (later renamed Edward Tilden Career Community Academy High School).

Reed obtained a Bachelor of Science in physics from Monmouth College in 1967. He continued his education, obtaining a Master of Science in Teaching in Physics from the University of Wisconsin-Superior in 1971. He later completed his Ph.D., concentrating on theoretical atomic physics, at the University of Nebraska–Lincoln in 1976.

== Career ==
After obtaining his Ph.D., Reed began teaching physics at Morehouse College. He maintained this role until 1980, when he joined Lawrence Livermore National Laboratory (LLNL), where he became a leading theoretical atomic physicist.

Cited for his work in promoting physics research and education in Africa, and collaborative projects between African and African American scientists, In 1997 and 1999, Reed was a visiting scientist at the Cheikh Anta Diop University in Senegal and at the University of Cape Coast in Ghana. He lectured at numerous other African universities and organized numerous international scientific conferences connected with Africa. Reed was also a visiting scientist at the Hahn-Meitner Institute in Germany and at the University College London in the United Kingdom.

Reed organized U.S. visits for African physicists including formal meetings and presentations at universities and high-level meetings in Washington, D.C. with government agencies such as the National Science Foundation, USAID, American Astronomical Society, and United States National Research Council and was on the international advisory panel for the African School on Electronic Structure Methods and Applications.

Reed served on the review panels for the United States Department of Energy, the National Science Foundation, and the National Research Council. He also served as Vice Chair of the APS Committee on International Scientific Affairs, a member of the APS Task Force on Research Collaborations with Africa, and was the U.S. representative on the International Union of Pure and Applied Physics (IUPAP) Commission on Physics for Development.

== Awards ==
In 2003, Professor Reed received the American Physical Society's John Wheatley Award. He was the recipient of the 2009 Presidential Award for Excellence in Science, Mathematics and Engineering Mentoring from President Barack Obama.

He was a fellow of the American Physical Society. In 2011, he was awarded the distinction of being elected as a fellow of the American Association for the Advancement of Science.

He was president of the International Union of Pure and Applied Physics (IUPAP) from 2017 to October 2019 when he chose to step down for personal reasons. He also served on the National Academy of Sciences Board on International Scientific Organizations and was a charter fellow and president of the National Society of Black Physicists.

== Awards named after Kennedy Reed ==
=== Kennedy Reed Award ===
For his outstanding contribution in theoretical physics, APS Farwest section established the Kennedy Reed Award for Best Theoretical Research to recognize the best research in theoretical physics by a graduate student in the annual meeting of APS Farwest section.

=== IUPAP Kennedy Reed Medal for Outstanding Contributions to the Enhancement of Physics in Developing Countries ===
Kennedy Reed worked hard in the support of physics in Africa and in improving the participation and recognition of minority groups. To honor Reed's memory, one of the IUPAP medals carries his name as of 2023. The first medal will be awarded in October 2024.

== Publications ==
- Reed, Kennedy J. (1988-03-01). "Relativistic distorted-wave collision strengths for Ba^{46+}". Physical Review A. 37 (5). American Physical Society (APS): 1791–1794. Bibcode:1988PhRvA..37.1791R. doi:10.1103/physreva.37.1791. ISSN 0556-2791. PMID 9899863.
- Msezane, Alfred Z.; Lee, J.; Reed, Kennedy J.; Henry, Ronald J. W. (1986-11-01). "Electron-impact excitation of oxygenlike krypton". Physical Review A. 34 (5). American Physical Society (APS): 3735–3742. Bibcode:1986PhRvA..34.3735M. doi:10.1103/physreva.34.3735. ISSN 0556-2791. PMID 9897716.
- Cipolla, Sam J.; Reed, Kennedy J. (1993). "Molecular orbital analysis of L X-ray cross sections measured for slow Ar-Cu collisions". Nuclear Instruments and Methods in Physics Research Section B: Beam Interactions with Materials and Atoms. 79 (1–4). Elsevier BV: 203–205. Bibcode:1993NIMPB..79..203C. doi:10.1016/0168-583x(93)95325-y. ISSN 0168-583X.
- Reed, Kennedy J.; Henry, Ronald J. W. (1989-08-01). "Close-coupling cross sections for electron-impact excitation of Kr^{28+}". Physical Review A. 40 (4). American Physical Society (APS): 1823–1827. Bibcode:1989PhRvA..40.1823R. doi:10.1103/physreva.40.1823. ISSN 0556-2791. PMID 9902339.
- Msezane, Alfred Z.; Reed, Kennedy J.; Henry, Ronald J. W. (1986-09-01). "Coupling effects in electron-impact excitation of oxygenlike krypton". Physical Review A. 34 (3). American Physical Society (APS): 2540–2542. Bibcode:1986PhRvA..34.2540M. doi:10.1103/physreva.34.2540. ISSN 0556-2791. PMID 9897560.
- Reed, Kennedy J.; Griffin, Donald C. (1992-04-09). Future directions in electron-ion collision physics. Future Direction in Electron-Ion Collision Physics. Atlanta, GA. pp. 9–10. Bibcode:1992fdei.rept....9R.
