= Eva Shaver =

Dr. Eva Shoutp Shaver (c. 1871 – April 6, 1938) was an American physician and abortion provider in Chicago, Illinois. On May 26, 1915, a young woman named Anna Johnson was found dead in Shaver's home, with a bullet hole in her head. Police speculated that Johnson had died of complications of an abortion performed by Shaver, who then shot the dead woman in the head in an attempt to pass the death off as a suicide. Abortion was illegal at the time.

Shaver was tried for Johnson's death, as well as for the death of another abortion patient in 1916. Although she was a physician, the case rekindled a campaign against midwives, since journalists and politicians assumed that female physicians were midwives and that midwives provided abortions. Coverage exaggerated the idea that young girls were being killed by botched abortions from abortion providers, when in reality most deaths were from self-induced abortions.

== Education and practice ==
Eva Shaver graduated with her doctorate degree from The National Medical University. The National Medical University was a credible university until it was closed by the department of health soon after Dr. Shaver received her degree.

Dr. Eva Shaver lived with her son Clarence Shaver in their Chicago home. She worked as a midwife while her son Clarence Shaver owned an "abortion parlor" to sell abortion pills.

== Illegal abortions ==
In May 1915, a young man named Marshall Hostetler met up with Clarence Shaver and asked for a pill to cure his lover, Anna Johnson, of an unwanted pregnancy. After finding that the abortion pills did not work, Clarence requested that the couple pay a visit to his mother Dr. Eva Shaver, the midwife. Anna Johnson then travelled to Dr. Shaver and her son's illegal abortion clinic in their Chicago home. At this time, Dr. Eva Shaver was 25 years old and had severely botched Anna Johnson's abortion and in effort to cover up the mistake, she and Clarence made it appear as though Anna had committed suicide. It was not until the next day when W.C. Harvey, a roommate at the Shaver home, discovered Anna Johnson's body and reported it to the police. When the police arrived at the Shaver home, Dr. Eva Shaver claimed that she had hired Anna Johnson as her housekeeper recently. Dr. Shaver claimed to have been working on a house call when she committed suicide in her son's room inside their home. However, the police were very skeptical of Dr. Shaver and suspected she was performing illegal abortions . The police's suspicion led them to look below her floorboards for aborted babies that she might be hiding. The police finally noticed that the revolver in Anna Johnson's left hand belonged to Clarence Shaver. The bullet that killed Anna Johnson entered the right side of her head, which puzzled the police because the revolver was found in her left hand.

Following the trial, many newspapers combined with the press emphasized the dangers of abortion and midwifery. Midwives were blamed by politicians and the press for the problem of abortion in the country. The 1915 campaigns against abortion caused enforcement of the criminal abortion laws. In Chicago, police arrested more physicians for abortion than ever before. With the new enforcement of abortion laws, Dr. Shaver was held for trial for Anna Johnson's death. Then later in 1916, Dr. Eva Shaver was found guilty of manslaughter when she killed Lillian Glovenco, an 18 year old bride, during an abortion. With the murder of Lillian Glovenco, Dr. Shaver was able to be connected to the death of Anna Johnson.
