= Kevin Cushing =

American businessman (born 1956)

Kevin K. Cushing (born 1956) is an American businessman and the former chief executive officer of AlphaGraphics, a franchised chain of more than 260 independently owned and operated marketing service providers with full-service print shops.

== Early life ==
Cushing was born in Chicago, Illinois in 1956. Growing up in Chicago, he began his business career at an early age, delivering the Chicago Tribune newspaper. While attending Saint Mary's University of Minnesota in Winona, Minnesota, Cushing and some friends ran the campus pub. He later went on to earn an MBA from the University of Chicago in 1982.

== Career ==
Cushing has spent his career in franchising. During the 1980s and 1990s, he was the President of Terratron, a group that owned and operated 81 Hardee's restaurants throughout the Mid-West and Mountain West. In 1995, Cushing moved his family from Salt Lake City, Utah to Minneapolis, Minnesota to open his first of two AlphaGraphics franchises in the Minneapolis market. In 2004, he became the chief executive officer of AlphaGraphics and ran the company until his departure in 2012.

Cushing parted ways with the company in the same month that Blackstreet Capital, a Bethesda, Maryland based private equity firm purchased AlphaGraphics. The announcement came as a surprise to many as Cushing was quoted just days after the acquisition, saying, "This transition has been seamless for AlphaGraphics, and the Blackstreet Capital people have been fabulous to work with. They were on site here at our headquarters within hours of closing the deal. They were clearly the most proactive of the potential buyers and our team had a very positive reaction to them. If you have to change ownership, we wanted whoever would be best for the company and the network, and Blackstreet was high on our list."
