= E. Lloyd Du Brul =

American anatomist (1909–1996)

E. Lloyd Du Brul (April 5, 1909 – July 24, 1996) was a world-renowned anatomist, physical anthropologist and educator, and the developer of the science of biomechanics of the head and neck.

Du Brul, along with Harry Sicher, wrote the textbook Sicher's and Du Brul's Oral Anatomy, which is considered to be the definitive oral anatomy text (Ishiyaku EuroAmerica Inc., publisher). The book has been published in English, Italian, Japanese, Portuguese, and Spanish. Du Brul also authored or co-authored four other books and contributed to seven others, including writing the "Form and Function, Biological" section of the 15th edition of Encyclopædia Britannica, 1974. He contributed many articles, abstracts, and book reviews to scientific journals from the 1940s through the 1980s.

An accomplished artist, Du Brul drew many of the illustrations that appeared in his books and articles.

His teaching career included appointments at New York-Presbyterian Hospital, 1939–42, and Polyclinic Hospital, 1940–42, both in New York City. He was professor emeritus at the University of Illinois at Chicago College of Dentistry, 1946–77. At the college, he founded the Department of Oral Anatomy and served as its head from 1964 to 1977.

Well known for his imaginative teaching style, Du Brul pioneered the concept that, in biomechanics, function follows form. A student of mechanics, architecture, and engineering, he was the first dental instructor to apply these disciplines to the understanding of jaw and skull movement.

For 50 years, Du Brul travelled the world collecting human, animal, and prehistoric skeletal artifacts, personally dissecting and preparing many of them for teaching. The collection is housed in the University of Illinois at Chicago College of Dentistry.

Du Brul earned his DDS degree from New York University in 1937. He later earned an MS degree in 1949 and a PhD degree in 1955 at the University of Illinois at Chicago.

During World War II, Du Brul distinguished himself while serving in Europe under General George S. Patton in the United States Army 4th Auxiliary Surgical Group. He led a team that handled over 500 face repairs under enemy fire.

Du Brul was married to concert pianist Florence Kirsch Du Brul. After his death, she set up the ‘’Du Brul Scholars Fund” at UIC.

== Publications ==
Du Brul’s publications include;

- Sicher's Oral Anatomy (1980)
- Oral Anatomy (1970)
- The Adaptive Chin (1964)
- The Physiology of Oral Reconstruction
- Biomechanics of the body (1965)
- Evolution Of The Speech Apparatus (with Otto F Kampmeier)
- Sicher and DuBrul’s Oral Anatomy (with Harry Sicher) (1988)
