= Grace Jeffers =

American writer, historian, educator and artist

- Born: Gracemarie Jeffers; 1967 (age 58–59)
- Education: Art Institute of Chicago, Bard Graduate Center
- Known for: Artist, writer, designer, historian
- Notable work: The Wilson House, Temple TX; The USS Growler, New York, NY
- Website: http://www.gracejeffers.com

Grace Jeffers (born 1967) is an American writer, historian, educator and artist based in New York. She pioneered and continues to lead an interdisciplinary and integrated approach to the study of materials. Her writings and lectures draw on 20th century art, design and cultural history, emphasizing the intelligent use of synthetic and manmade materials in the practice of design.

She is referenced in The Museum of Modern Art Design Encyclopedia, published by the Museum of Modern Art, New York.

== Biography ==
Jeffers has been involved in design since she was a teenager and her entrepreneurship started early too.

She has always been an innovator in conservation and her solo restoration of The Ralph Sr. and Sunny Wilson House earned a National Merit Award for Historic Preservation from the National Trust for the preservation in 1999. The house, completed in 1959, is distinguished by its extensive and innovative use of use plastic laminate throughout, including laminated wall paneling, shower surrounds and the first known post-formed countertop edges. The Wilson House became the first vernacular mid-century modern structure ever awarded National Landmark status when it was designated a significant architectural structure by the Texas Historical Commission in 1998. It is on the National Register of Historic Places and is the only structure listed because of its use of materials.

In 2009, Jeffers completed the restoration of a Cold War-era submarine, the USS Growler, for the Intrepid Sea, Air & Space Museum in New York.

Jeffers writes and lectures on design across the U.S. and in Canada, frequently on the attributed values of natural and manmade materials and the environmental impacts of material selection. She argues that "we should understand what truly is wild and embrace how synthetics … can preserve nature…"

Her presentations on design and materials have been sponsored by the American Society of Industrial Designers (ASID), the Interior Design Continuing Education Council Inc. (IDCEC), the American Institute of Architects (AIA), and the National Exposition of Contract Furnishings (NeoCon). At NeoCon 2016, Jeffers’ lecture on Global Forestry 101 addressed the relationship between wood products and their forests of origin, identifying threatened and endangered wood species.

Jeffers works as a design consultant for several American material manufacturers, including Wilsonart, a manufacturer of high pressure laminates, and MeadWestvaco, a packaging company. Her Lustralite® product line for MeadWestvaco (now Onyx Specialty Papers) has been in production for over a decade.

In 2003, she conceived the Wilsonart-sponsored chair design class and student design competition, "Wilsonart Challenges." For the past 13 year she has been the creative director of the program, co-teaching each class, a final judge and a mentor to all the students who've entered. The annual competition aims to foster the careers of emerging furniture designers in North America by challenging students to push past design conventions and create an iconic chair. Each year, Wilsonart partners with a different design school in the oldest running program of its type the United States.

In 1999 she created the "Millennium Collection" of custom-designed laminates for Wilsonart. The collection featured the work of 22 artists, including ceramicist Jonathan Adler, furniture makers Lloyd Schwan and Nick Dine, industrial designer Karim Rasid, and illustrator Mark Todd.13

Jeffers is a listed notable alumni of The Bard Graduate Center.

== Writing ==
Jeffers has written extensively on design, its design history and materials. She has served as a contributor and design editor to architectural trade magazines. Her articles have appeared in such publications as O at Home, Metropolitan Home and Interiors & Sources. She is currently writing a collection of essays and a design history of Formica. Jeffers contributed an essay to Skin: Surface, Substance, and Design authored by Ellen Lupton. The book accompanied an exhibition at the Cooper-Hewitt National Design Museum, New York.

== Selected writings ==
- Master's thesis, Bard Graduate Center for Studies in the Decorative Arts: Machine Made Natural: The Decorative Products of the Formica Corporation, 1947–1962

=== Books ===
- Skin: Surface, Substance and Design
- The Good Building
- Design for Dogs (essay contribution)
- Preserving the Origin of the Everyday: The Wilson House (Ralph Wilson Sr. & Bonnie McIninich, 1959) by Grace Jeffers, DOCOMOMO Journal 24

== Exhibits and collections ==
Jeffers has curated a number of exhibitions.

- 1994–95 Crosscurrents of Modernism: Early 20th Century Masterpieces from the Virginia Museum, Bard Graduate Center, New York.
- Grace Jeffers Collection of Formica Materials, 1913–2003 invention.si.edu/grace-jeffers-collection-formica-materials-1913–2003
- July 23, 2014 – Inventor Name. O'Conor, Daniel J. Repository. National Museum of American History Smithsonian Institution Archives Center P.O. Box 37012
- Laminate Countertops – National Museum of American History amhistory.si.edu/archives/AC0565.htm
- Grace Jeffers Collection of Formica Materials, 1913–2003., Repository: Archives Center, National Museum of American History, Smithsonian Institution, Washington.

== Selected awards ==
2015 Metropolis Likes (student chairs)

2015 IFDA Award (student chairs)

2015 IAIR Award (Wilsonart Challenges student chair competition)

2001 ICFF Editors Award, International Contemporary Furniture Fair (folding architecture project with SU11 Architecture and Design)

2000 Good Design Award by the Chicago Athenaeum (Wilsonart Airstream)

2000 ICFF Editors Award, International Contemporary Furniture Fair (Wilsonart Airstream)

1999 Merit Award for Historic Preservation, National Trust for Historic Preservation (Wilson House)

1999 Modernism Award, Metropolitan Home magazine

1999 ICFF Editors Award, International Contemporary Furniture Fair (Millennium Collection)
