= Ross Rosenberg =

American psychotherapist

- Born: March 16, 1961 (age 65); Chicago, Illinois, U.S.
- Education: Towson University; Boston University
- Occupations: Psychotherapist, author, educator
- Website: www.selfloverecovery.com

Ross Allen Rosenberg (born March 16, 1961) is an American psychotherapist, author, and educator known for his work on codependency, narcissistic abuse, and attachment trauma. He is the founder of the Self-Love Recovery Institute and is known for developing the concepts of the Human Magnet Syndrome and Self-Love Deficit Disorder (SLDD), which he describes as an alternative framework for understanding codependency.

== Early life and education ==
Rosenberg underwent inpatient treatment for substance abuse in his youth, which he has cited as influencing his interest in emotional trauma and interpersonal dysfunction. He served in the United States Army Military Intelligence between 1979 and 1983 as a signals intelligence specialist and Morse code interceptor.

After completing his military service, Rosenberg pursued studies in psychology. He earned a Bachelor of Arts in psychology from Towson University and a master's degree in counseling psychology from Boston University in 1988.

== Career ==
Rosenberg began his career as a psychotherapist in 1988, focusing on trauma, addiction, personality disorders, and dysfunctional relationship patterns. From 2010 to 2020, he served as Clinical Director of Clinical Care Consultants, a counseling practice he owned with locations in Arlington Heights and Inverness, Illinois.

In 2013, Rosenberg founded the Self-Love Recovery Institute, an organization that provides counseling, educational programs, and professional training related to recovery from codependency and relational trauma.

He has presented at professional conferences, including the Illinois Counseling Association (2012) and the Summit for Clinical Excellence (2018). He has also served as an expert witness in legal proceedings involving narcissistic abuse, codependency, and trauma disorders.

=== Theoretical work ===
Rosenberg’s clinical contributions addresses relational dysfunction, attachment trauma, and self-esteem deficits. Self-Love Deficit Disorder (SLDD) is Rosenberg’s model proposing that a lack of self-love leads to codependency, which fuels unhealthy relationships—particularly with narcissists—in a predictable cycle. His Self-Love Deficit Disorder Pyramid illustrates the hierarchical and developmental nature of the disorder.

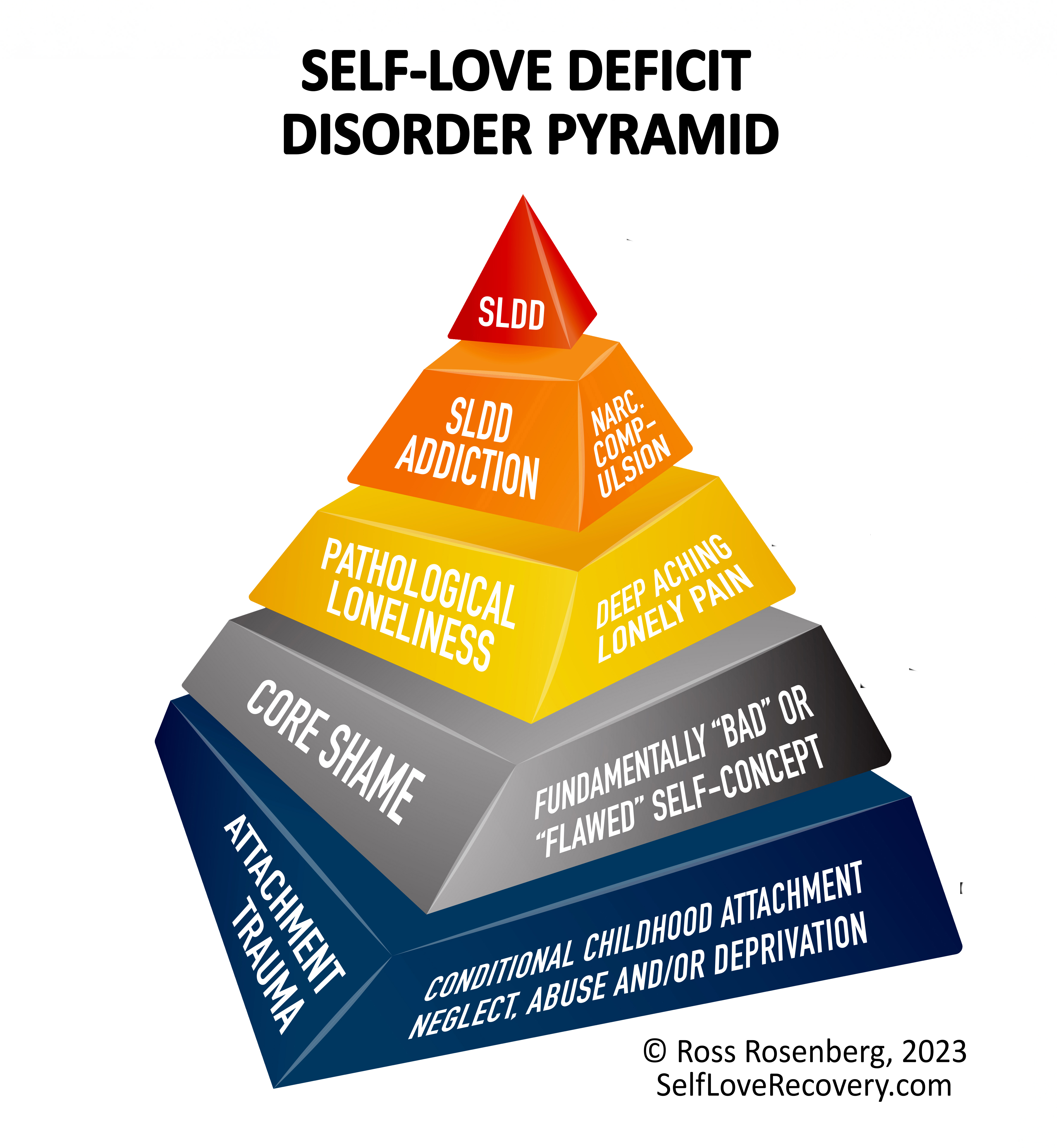
Rosenberg's Self-Love Deficit Disorder Pyramid

The Human Magnet Syndrome is Rosenberg’s theory explaining the recurring attraction between codependent individuals and narcissistic partners, proposing that opposing emotional needs and traits unconsciously draw them together in dysfunctional yet complementary relationships. The theory’s Relationship Compatibility Continuum illustrates the inverse and opposing dynamics characterizing codependent–narcissist attraction patterns.

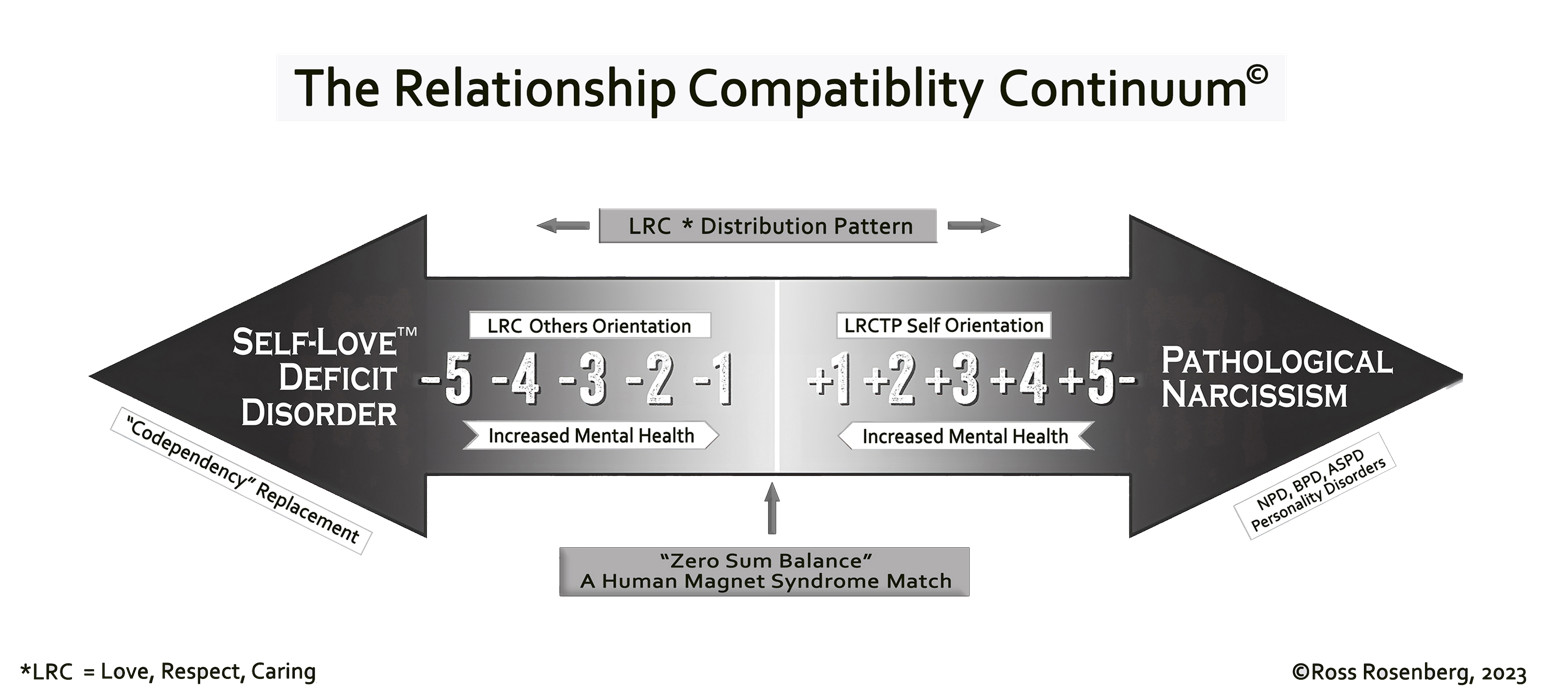
Rosenberg's Relationship Compatibility Continuum

== Publications ==
Rosenberg has authored several books, including:

- The Human Magnet Syndrome: Why We Love People Who Hurt Us (2013)
- The Human Magnet Syndrome: The Codependent–Narcissist Trap (2017)
- The Codependency Revolution: Fixing What Was Always Broken (2024)
- The Human Magnet Syndrome Workbook (2025)

These works focus on interpersonal trauma, narcissistic relationships, and strategies for recovery.

Rosenberg has contributed articles to Psych Central and The Huffington Post.

== Awards and recognition ==
In 2013, Rosenberg received the Mental Health Award from the Illinois Mental Health Counselors Association. The Illinois Counseling Association recognized him with the Professional Counseling Publication Award in 2014. His book The Human Magnet Syndrome received the Wendell S. Dysinger Award in 2014.
