= Joseph Polowsky =

American soldier and later anti-war activist

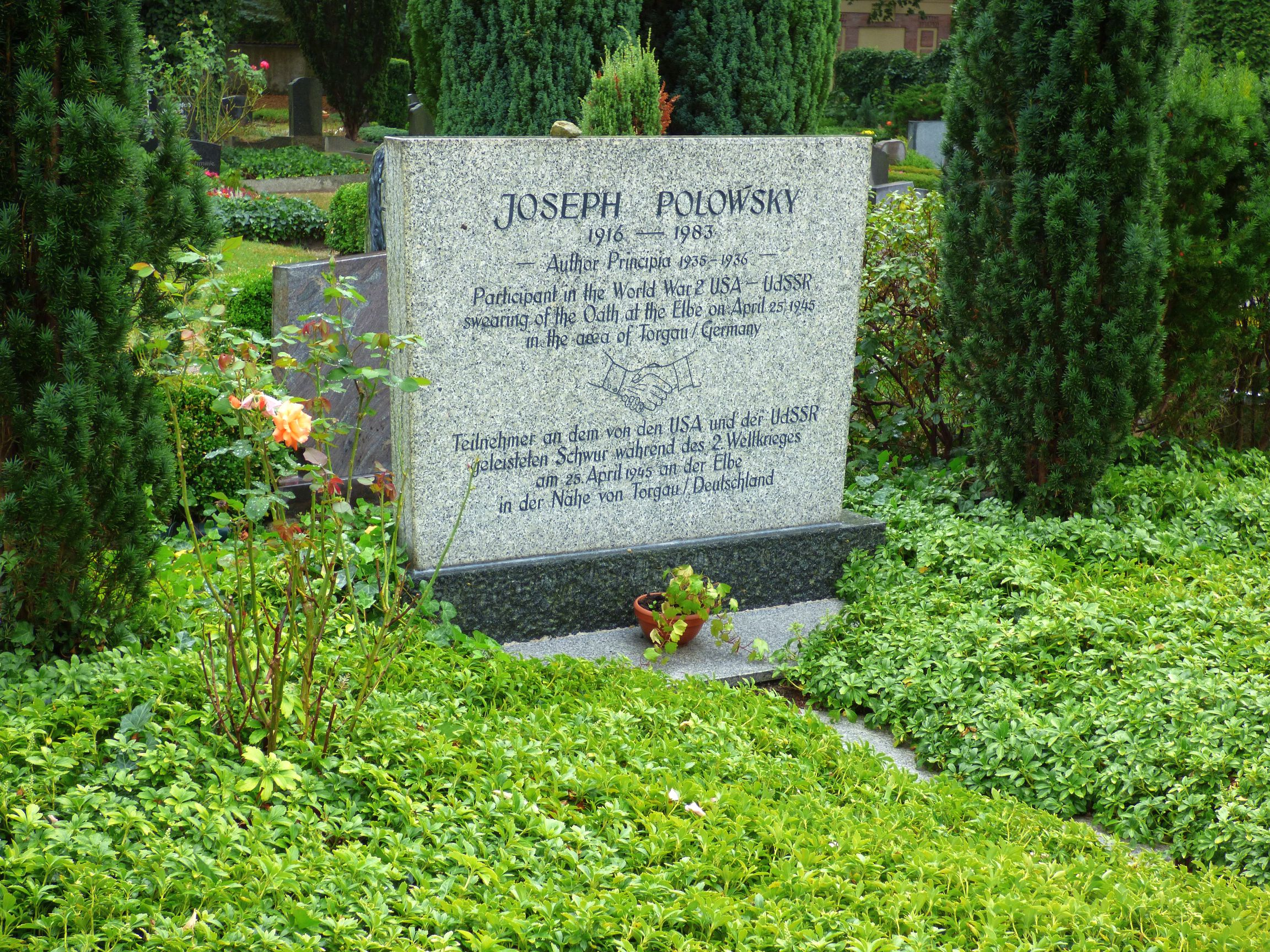
Joe Polowsky's gravestone in Torgau

Joseph "Joe" Polowsky (October 2, 1916 – October 17, 1983) was an American soldier who with others met Soviet troops on the banks of Elbe River on April 25, 1945, and later became an anti-war activist.

== Early life ==
Polowsky was born Chicago, Illinois. Polowsky was the youngest son of Jewish immigrants who had immigrated from the Kiev area in the Russian Empire to the United States and attended the University of Chicago. Polowsky worked first as a conductor and bus driver for the Chicago Transit Authority, then as a taxi driver for the Checker Cab Company in Chicago.

== World War II ==
During World War II, he was conscripted and served in the 69th Infantry Division. He belonged to a scouting party which crossed the Elbe in Torgau on April 25, 1945, and met Soviet troops on the other bank. Polowsky, who knew the Russian language, served to translate between the two groups. The Americans and the Soviets saw bodies of German civilians killed by stray artillery fire near the river. To his horror, Polowsky saw a dead girl, about five or six years old, clutching a doll in one hand and clinging to her dead mother with her other hand. The soldiers of both armies swore to do everything to prevent a new war.

== Post-World War II ==
In 1946, Polowsky was discharged from the Army. Back in the U.S., he unsuccessfully asked the United Nations to declare 25 April a World Day of Peace.

Each year he commemorated the Elbe Day on the Michigan Avenue Bridge in Chicago and held a vigil. He continued towork as a taxi driver.

In 1955, Polowsky visited Moscow together with Soviet veterans for the tenth anniversary of the Elbe meeting.

In 1959, he met Soviet Prime Minister Nikita Khrushchev who visited the United States. A short time later, he was invited to visit the Soviet Union where he again met Khrushchev in the Kremlin. Then he visited East Germany and met Walter Ulbricht.

Already ill with cancer, Polowsky held his last vigil on Michigan Avenue Bridge on April 25, 1983. He died in Chicago on October 17, 1983. In his will he asked to be buried in Torgau, and was buried there with military honors on November 26, 1983.

== Legacy ==
In 1995, a high school in Torgau was named after him. He was memorialized in the Fred Small song "At The Elbe". A new rose variety was dedicated to Joe Polowsky in Torgau in 2006.

== See also ==
- List of peace activists
- Charles Thau
