= Charlotte Rothstein =

American artist

Charlotte Rothstein Ross
- Born: Charlotte Bergman; 1912; Chicago, Illinois
- Died: 1991 (aged 78–79)

Charlotte Rothstein Ross, née Bergman (1912 – 1991) was an American lithograph artist. Her work is included in the collections of the Smithsonian American Art Museum, the Museum of Modern Art, New York, the Crystal Bridges Museum of American Art and the Art Institute of Chicago. She was the wife of novelist and scriptwriter Sam Ross.

== Early life ==
Ross was born in Chicago, Illinois, in 1912. Her interest in art began when she was 3 years old, and she would regularly visit The Art Institute of Chicago by herself starting at the age of 8 and continuing into her teenage years.
