= National Physical Science Consortium =

- Abbreviation: NPSC
- Formation: 1989
- Legal status: Non-profit
- Purpose: Education, Minority groups
- Headquarters: Los Angeles, California 90007
- Location: United States
- Program administrator: Dr Joretta Joseph
- Website: npsc.org

The National Physical Science Consortium is a US non-profit organization composed of leading universities, national laboratories, corporations, and government agencies whose aim is increase the number of American citizens with graduate degrees and Ph.Ds in the physical sciences and related engineering fields. It emphasizes the recruitment of women and underrepresented minorities.

Since the organization's inception in 1989, the NPSC has awarded more than 467 graduate fellowships; more than 200 at PhD level and more than 90 Master's degree. Ninety-five percent of NPSC fellows have been minority, female, or both, sections of society underrepresented in science. Participating employers selecting NPSC fellows include Lawrence Livermore National Laboratory, the National Security Agency, Sandia National Laboratories in New Mexico and California.

The NPSC founders include African American professor Kennedy J. Reed of the Physics & Advanced Technologies Directorate at Lawrence Livermore National Laboratory.

== Fellowship program ==
NPSC Graduate Fellowships are offered to all American citizens and last from two to six years, providing financial support of $20,000 per year, up to a maximum of $200,000. It covers tuition and allows fellows to hold a research or teaching assistantship positions while gaining work experience with the sponsoring employer during the summer. Fellowships apply to the fields of astronomy, chemistry, computer science, geology, materials science, mathematical sciences, physics and numerous disciplines of engineering. The NPSC also offers mentorship.

Recruitment is carried out through referrals from professors and other students.
