= Margaret Horton Potter =

American novelist

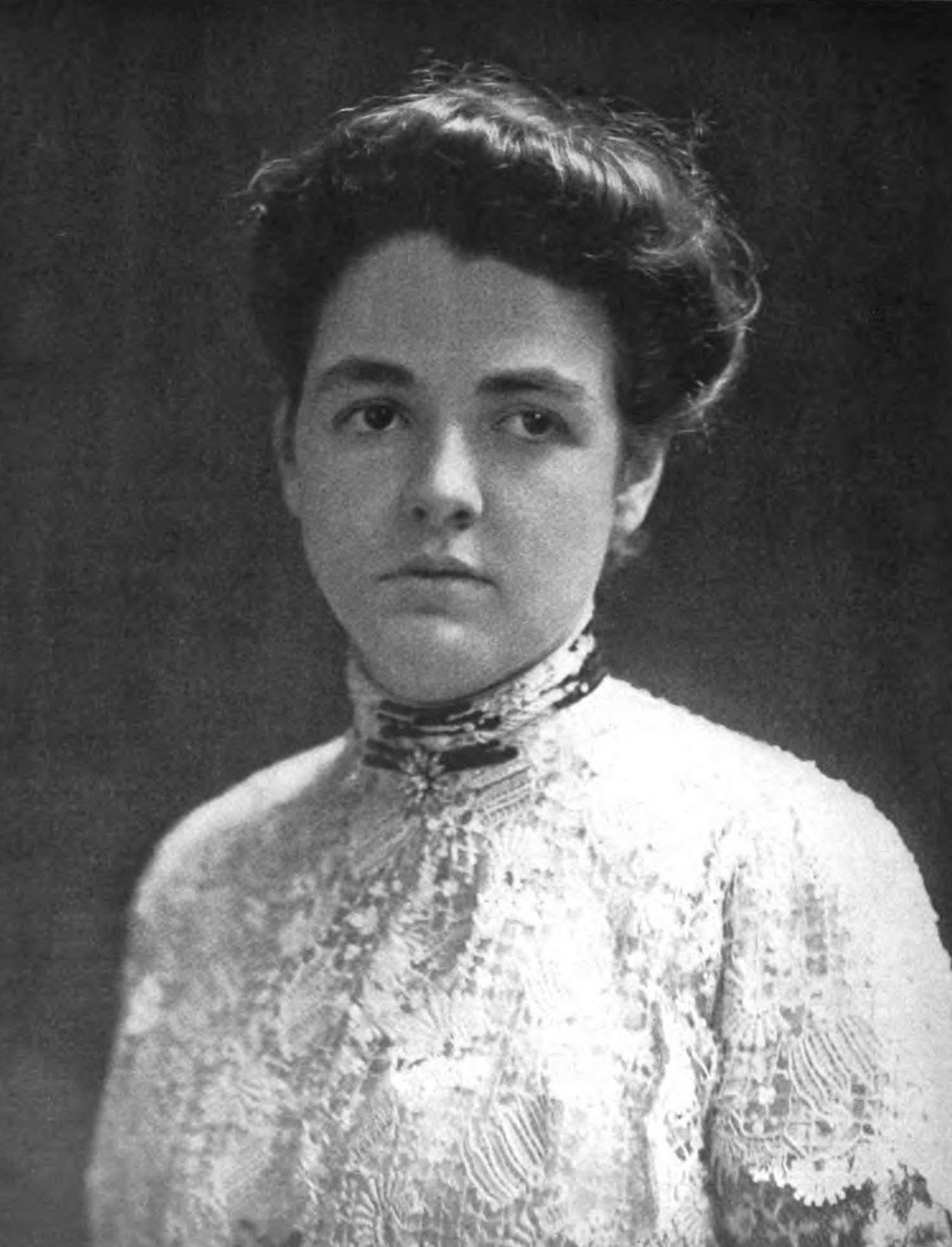
Photo portrait published 1904

Margaret Horton Potter (pseudonym, Robert Dolly Williams; May 20, 1881 – December 22, 1911) was an American novelist, specializing in historical fiction. Her first novel, A Social Lion, was published while she was still a teenager.

== Early life ==
Potter was born in Chicago, Illinois, the daughter of Orrin Woodard Potter (1836–1907), a wealthy steel manufacturer, and Ellen Owen Potter, who was active in women's clubs. She was educated at a local prep school and "pursued advanced studies under a private tutor".

== Career ==
Potter was a teenager when R. R. Donnelley and Sons published her novel A Social Lion (1899), under the pseudonym Robert Dolly Williams. It features a wealthy Chicago writer who "lives in fear ... that a past alliance will be discovered and bring him social disgrace." Modeled on actual people and events in Chicago society, it was considered such a scandalous tale that her family tried (unsuccessfully) to prevent its publication.

Her other novels include Uncanonized: A Romance of English Monachism (1900); The House of de Mailly: A Romance (1901); Istar of Babylon: A Phantasy (1902); The Castle of Twilight (1903); The Flame-Gatherers (1904); The Fire of Spring (1905); The Genius (1906); The Princess (1907); and The Golden Ladder (1908). Most of them are historical fiction, with romance plots and exotic settings for American readers, though A Social Lion and The Golden Ladder are set in Chicago. There are fantasy elements in some of her novels, such as supernatural characters (the title character in Istar of Babylon is the goddess Ishtar) and the transmigrated souls in The Flame-Gatherers.

Potter also wrote short stories and poems that appeared in Harper's Magazine. She and Wallace Rice co-wrote The Devil's Choice, a play that was produced in Chicago in 1909.

== Personal life ==
Potter married lawyer John Donald Black (son of John C. Black) on January 1, 1902. In about 1905, she became addicted to morphine. In May 1910 she was declared mentally incompetent due to chronic alcoholism and morphine addiction and institutionalized. After her release, her husband divorced her for "habitual drunkenness". She died from a morphine overdose, ruled accidental, in 1911, aged 30 years.
