= Sukekatsu Ushioda =

Japanese physicist (1941–2023)

- 潮田 資勝
- Born: September 18, 1941; Chiba, Empire of Japan
- Died: December 10, 2023 (aged 82); Kanazawa, Ishikawa, Japan
- Education: Dartmouth College; University of Pennsylvania
- Awards: APS Fellow (1996); Chevalier of the Legion of Honour (2016)
- Scientific career
- Fields: Surface physics
- Workplaces: University of California, Irvine; Research Institute of Electronic Communication; Japan Advanced Institute of Science and Technology

Sukekatsu Ushioda (Japanese: 潮田 資勝, 18 September 1941 – 10 December 2023) was a Japanese physicist who specialized in surface physics. He was the president of the International Union of Pure and Applied Physics and the Physical Society of Japan.

== Biography ==
Born in Chiba Prefecture on 18 September 1941, he graduated from Tokyo Metropolitan Hibiya High School. After completing high school, he moved to the United States, where he graduated from Dartmouth College in 1964 and earned his PhD from the University of Pennsylvania in 1969. The same year, he joined the Department of Physics at the University of California, Irvine as an assistant professor, was promoted to associate professor in 1974, and to full professor in 1978. From 1985 to 2004, he served as a professor at the Research Institute of Electronic Communication, Tohoku University. He also concurrently held a professorship in the Japan Advanced Institute of Science and Technology (JAIST) from 1993 to 2000. From 2003 to 2004, he served as president of the Physical Society of Japan. In 2004, he was appointed president of JAIST, followed by appointments as visiting professor at the Kanazawa Institute of Technology in 2008, fellow and director of the Nanotechnology Research Center at the National Institute for Materials Science in 2008, and president of the Institute in July 2009. Additionally, he served as president of the International Union of Pure and Applied Physics for three years beginning in 2008. He died in Kanazawa City, Ishikawa Prefecture, on 10 December 2023.

== Awards ==
He was elected a Fellow of the American Physical Society in 1996 and was awarded the Chevalier of the Legion of Honor in 2016.
