= Susumu Satomi =

Japanese surgeon and academic

- 里見 進

21st President of Tohoku University
- In office 2012–2018
- Preceded by: Akihisa Inoue
- Succeeded by: Hideo Ohno

Personal details
- Born: 18 June 1948 (age 78) Okinawa
- Education: Tohoku University

- Susumu Satomi (portrait)

Susumu Satomi (里見 進, Satomi Susumu; born 18 June 1948) is a Japanese surgeon and academic administrator. He was the 21st president of Tohoku University and the president of the Japan Association of National Universities. Satomi previously served as the director of the Tohoku University Hospital, and the vice president of Tohoku University. He was the president of the Japan Surgical Society from 2008-2012.

== Education ==
Satomi graduated from Okinawa prefecture's Naha High School in 1967. In 1974, he received his Doctor of Medicine degree from Tohoku University in Sendai city, Japan, and then his doctorate in medical science in 1984. Following this, he worked as a research fellow at the Harvard Medical School Transplant Institute from 1984-1986.

== Surgical work ==
Satomi started working at the second Department of Surgery at Tohoku University Hospital in 1977. He was promoted to associate professor in 1986, and became a full professor in 1995. In 1998, he performed the first kidney transplant from a brain dead donor in Japan, following a change in law the previous year that legalized organ procurement from brain dead donors.

From 1999 he was a professor and chair of the Division of Advanced Surgical Science and Technology at the Tohoku University Graduate School of Medicine. Satomi became the director of the Tohoku University Hospital in 2004, until 2012.
