= Michel Spiro =

French physicist

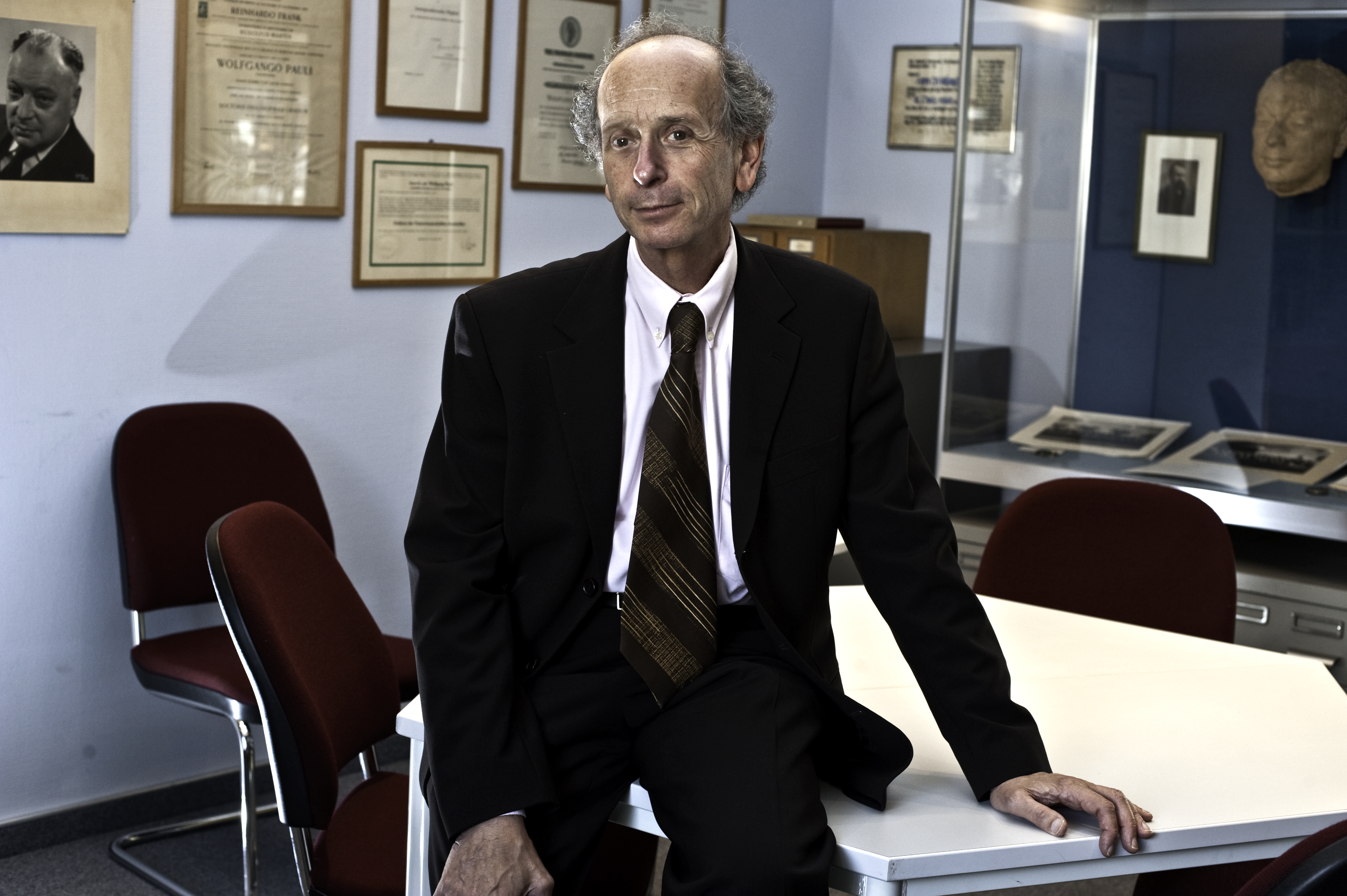
- Born: February 24, 1946 (age 80); Roanne, Loire, France
- Education: École polytechnique
- Relatives: Michel Goldberg (brother-in-law); Marc Goldberg (nephew)
- Awards: Prix Thibaud (1985); Prix Félix-Robin (1999)
- Scientific career
- Fields: Physics
- Workplaces: CEA; IN2P3; CERN

Michel Spiro (born 24 February 1946 in Roanne, Loire, France) is a French physicist and was President of the CERN Council between 2010 and 2013.

== Biography ==
Michel Spiro attended the high school Jean-Puy de Roanne. Spiro obtained the baccalauréat in 1963, with a specialisation in elementary mathematics. After this, he attended the school Lycée Louis-le-Grand to prepare his entry exam at the École polytechnique. He completed his graduate studies in theoretical physics in 1969.

He joined the French Alternative Energies and Atomic Energy Commission (CEA) in 1970, as an engineer. He was promoted to the position of director of the Particle Physics Section of the Department of Astrophysics, Particle Physics, Nuclear Physics and Associated Instrumentation (DAPNIA ) in 1991 and led the section until 1999. He became chargé de mission of the CEA and assistant scientific director in Centre national de la recherche scientifique (CNRS), responsible for astroparticle physics and neutrinos. He took over the leadership of DAPNIA in 2002. From 2003 to 2010 he was appointed director of Institut national de physique nucléaire et de physique des particules (IN2P3) in CNRS.

Spiro obtained his PhD from University of Paris-Sud, Orsay in 1976. His early research in particle physics led him, as a member of the UA1 experiment, to participate in the discovery of the intermediate bosons W and Z. He then turned to study particles from the cosmos by participating in the GALLEX solar neutrino detection experiment. He became then the spokesperson of the microlensing search experiment EROS(Experience de Recherche d'Objets Sombres).

From 1983 to 1999, Professor Spiro lectured quantum mechanics, then stellar equilibrium and evolution and finally energy and environment at the École Polytechnique.

From 2010 to 2013 he was President of CERN Council. His presidency overlapped with the start of LHC physics. Since then Spiro helds the position as research director emeritus at the CEA.

Michel Spiro was president of the French Physical Society from 2016 to 2017 and president-elect for International Union of Pure and Applied Physics (IUPAP) as of 2018. In October 2019 Spiro was asked to replace IUPAP president Kennedy J. Reed who wanted to step down for personal reasons. As of 2025 Spiro continues as IUPAP past president under the presidency of Silvina Ponce Dawson.

From June 2020 to December 2025, Michel Spiro was chair of the CERN and Society Foundation Board, a foundation to support and promote the mission of CERN, the European Organization for Nuclear Research, and disseminate its benefits to the wider public. In March 2024, he was appointed chair of the Curie and Joliot-Curie Association, succeeding to Edouard Brezin.

Spiro chaired during 2022 and 2023 the steering committee of the International Year of Basic Sciences for Sustainable Development (IYBSSD2022). He also contributed towards the proclamation on August 25, 2023, by the United Nations General Assembly, of an International Decade of Sciences for Sustainable Development 2024 to 2033. In this framework he chairs The Earth-Humanity Coalition during the year 2024.

== Awards and honors ==
- Officer of the Legion of Honour (2021), Knight (2004)
- Officer of the National Order of Merit (France) (2008)
- 1983: Prix Joliot-Curie of the French Physical Society
- 1985: Thibaud Prize of the Academy of Lyon
- 1995: Philip Morris Research Prize shared with M. Cribier and D. Vignaud for solar neutrinos (GALLEX)
- 1999: Félix Robin Prize of the Société Française de Physique
- 2000: Prize of the l'Association française pour le rayonnement international
- 2015: Fellow of the European Physical Society
- 2018: Prix A. Lagarrigue
- 2020: Honorary doctor of the Joint Institute for Nuclear Research
- 2025: Oganesson Prize

== Works and publications ==
=== Scientific articles ===
The database INSPIRE-HEP has recorded more than 200 scientific articles signed by Spiro.

=== Articles of special importance ===
- Experimental Observation of Isolated Large Transverse Energy Electrons with Associated Missing Energy at s**(1/2) =540-GeV. UA1 Collaboration (G.Arnison et al.). Feb 1983. 31 pp. Phys. Lett. B122 (1983) 103-116 DOI: 10.1016/0370-2693(83)91177-2
- Experimental Particle Physics Without Accelerators. J. Rich, D. Lloyd Owen, M. Spiro (Saclay). 1987. 126 pp. Phys. Rep. 151 (1987) 239-364 DOI: 10.1016/0370-1573(87)90055-X
- Search for superheavy hydrogen in sea water. M. Spiro, B. Pichard, J. Rich, J.P. Soirat, S. Zylberajch (DAPNIA, Saclay), G. Grynberg, F. Trehin, P. Verkerk, Pierre Fayet (École Normale Superieure), M.E. Goldberg (Pasteur Inst., Paris). 1990. Les Arcs 1990, Proceedings, New and exotic phenomena '90 489-498'
- Evidence for gravitational microlensing by dark objects in the galactic halo. EROS collaboration E. Aubourg, P. Bareyre, S. Brehin, M. Gros, M. Lachieze-Rey, B. Laurent, E. Lesquoy, C. Magneville, A. Milsztain, L. Moscoso (DAPNIA, Saclay) et al.. Oct 1993. 3 pp. Nature 365 (1993) 623-625 DOI: 10.1038/365623a0

=== Selected books ===
- Tannoudji, Gilles (1986). La matière espace-temps la logique des particules élémentaires (in French). Paris: Fayard. ISBN 978-2-213-01835-5. OCLC 708295981.
- Klein, Etienne (1994). Le temps et sa Flèche (in French). Gif-sur-Yvette: Ed. Frontières. ISBN 978-2-86332-154-6. OCLC 489906340.
- Tannoudji, Gilles (2017). Relativité et quanta : une nouvelle révolution scientifique (in French) (2 ed.). Paris: Le Pommier Universcience. ISBN 978-2-7465-1143-9. OCLC 984147627.
- Basdevant, J. L.; Rich, James; Spiro, Michel (2005). Fundamentals in nuclear physics : from nuclear structure to cosmology. New York: Springer. ISBN 978-0-387-25095-3. OCLC 262679959.
- Chardin, Gabriel [in French] (2009). Le LHC peut-il produire des trous noirs (in French). Paris: Éd. le Pommier. ISBN 978-2-7465-0412-7. OCLC 470732872.
- Tannoudji, Gilles (2013). Le boson et le chapeau mexicain : un nouveau grand récit de l'univers (in French). Paris: Gallimard. ISBN 978-2-07-035549-5. OCLC 852216917.
- Bernardeau, Francis; Klein, Etienne; Laplace, Sandrine; Spiro, Michel (2013). La physique des infinis (in French). S.l: La ville brûle. ISBN 978-2-36012-035-2. OCLC 862954310.
