= Trần Thanh Vân (physicist) =

French physicist

Jean Trần Thanh Vân
- Born: 4 July 1936 (age 90); Đồng Hới, French Indochina
- Education: University of Paris
- Known for: Rencontres de Moriond
- Spouse: Lê Kim Ngoc
- Awards: Knight of the National Order of Merit, France (1993); Knight of the Legion of Honor, France (1999); Friendship Order, Vietnam (2015)
- Scientific career
- Fields: Particle physics
- Workplaces: CNRS
- Thesis: Contribution à l’étude des corrections relativistes à la fonction d’onde du deutéron et à la diffusion élastique électron-deutéron (1963)

Trần Thanh Vân, also known as Jean Trần Thanh Vân (born 4 July 1936, Đồng Hới, Quảng Bình Province), is a Vietnamese-French physicist.

== Biography ==
Vân attended secondary school in Huế. In 1953, he left Vietnam for France. He studied mathematics and physics at University of Paris and earned his undergraduate degrees in 1957. For his PhD work, Vân, still at the University of Paris, turned his studies toward particle physics, focusing on the neutron as the natural partner of the proton in the structure of matter. He defended his thesis and obtained his doctoral degree in 1963.

After his PhD, Vân joined the French National Centre for Scientific Research (CNRS), where he spent his whole career. In 1991, he was given the title Directeur de Recherches, the most senior research position in France. As of 2001 he is emeritus Directeur de Recherches.

Vân's scientific work has focused on nucleon interactions at medium energy and the deuteron's relativistic wave function, the 2-body interactions at high energy, Regge poles and absorption models and the dual parton model. He has co-authored more than 300 scientific articles.

Vân is a promoter of the International Year of Basic Sciences for Sustainable Development, which was proclaimed by the United Nations General Assembly in December 2021.

== Rencontres ==
Trần Thanh Vân has become internationally renowned as the organizer of scientific meetings, in particular for the series Rencontres de Moriond, Rencontres de Blois and Rencontres du Vietnam.

=== Rencontres de Moriond ===
The first meeting took place at Moriond in the French Alps in 1966.

=== Rencontres de Blois ===
Since 1989 the «Rencontres de Blois» have been organised in the city of Blois, in France. While the Blois meetings have dealt with several topics, one of their great achievements has been to recognize (like Moriond) the cross-disciplinary field of astroparticle physics. The meetings have covered topics ranging from particle physics to chaos theory, life and planetary science.

=== Rencontres du Vietnam ===
The series «Rencontres du Vietnam»started in 1993 when Vietnam first re-opened to foreign scientists. The meetings are based on the same principle as for Moriond and Blois.

== Private life ==
He is married to Lê Kim Ngoc since 1961. The couple has two adult children. In 1970 Vân and Ngoc established the association «Aide à l’Enfance du Vietnam», to set up the SOS Children's Village in Vietnam.

== Awards ==
- Knight of the National Order of Merit, France (1993)
- Knight of the Legion of Honor, France (1999)
- Certificate of Appreciation, American Physical Society (June 2000)
- Docteur honoris causa, Russian Academy of Sciences (May 2001)
- Order of Friendship, Vietnam (2015)
- Tate Medal for International Leadership in Physics (2011)
- Docteur honoris causa, Joint Institute for Nuclear Research (2016)
