= Institute for Materials Research =

Japanese research institute

Coordinates: 38°15′18.2″N 140°52′19.1″E

The Institute for Materials Research (金属材料研究所, Kinzoku zairyō kenkyūsyo), abbreviated IMR or Kinken (金研, Kinken), is a research institute for materials science in the Tohoku University, Japan. It consistently ranks as one of the top in ISI citations on materials research. In 2001, it ranked first in the field of materials science by ISI, Philadelphia.

== Outline ==
The institute is the oldest of the five research institutes of Tohoku University. It was started 90 years ago by the late Professor Kotaro Honda for research on KS steel. In 1987, it was reorganized into its present form, a national collaborative research institute, and designated as a Center of Excellence (COE) for materials science.

IMR's research field is diverse materials as well as metals. Some of its recent creations include new types of materials, including high-performance, high-quality and multifunctional materials such as amorphous alloys with complex structures, and bulk metallic glasses developed from them. The institute also specialises in multicomponent intermetallic compounds, quasicrystals, oxides, ceramics, nanostructural controlled metals, semiconductors, crystals for solar cells, biomaterials, organic materials, hydrogen storage alloys, and shaped crystals, among others.

== Former names ==
The present name of the institute is the Institute for Materials Research (IMR).

- April 1, 1916: the 2nd Division of the Provisional Institute of Physical and Chemical Research(東北帝国大学理科大学臨時理化学研究所第2部)
- May 21, 1919: the Iron and Steel Research Institute (ISRI)(東北帝国大学附属鉄鋼研究所)
- August 8, 1922: the Research Institute for Iron, Steel and Other Metals (RIISOM)(東北帝国大学金属材料研究所, 東北大学金属材料研究所1947)
- May 21, 1987: Institute for Materials Research (IMR)

== Research results ==
Refer to this page.

== People ==
=== Presidents ===
- 1st Kotaro Honda (本田光太郎)
- 2nd Torajiro Ishihara (石原寅次郎)
- 3rd Takejiro Murakami (村上武次郎)
- 4th Kotaro Honda (本田光太郎)
- 5th Torajiro Ishihara (石原寅次郎)
- 6th Hakaru Masumoto (増本量)
- 7th Ichiji Obinata (大日方一司)
- 8th Tokutaro Hirone (広根徳太郎)
- 9th Eizo Kanda (神田英蔵)
- 10th Sakae Takeuchi (竹内榮)
- 11th Hiroshi Watanabe (渡辺浩)
- 12th Eihachiro Tanaka (田中英八郎)
- 13th Susumu Suzuki (鈴木進)
- 14th Makoto Hirabayasi (平林眞)
- 15th Tuyoshi Masumoto (増本健)
- 16th Kenji Suzuki (鈴木謙爾)
- 17th Hiroyasu Fujimori (藤森啓安)
- 18th Akihisa Inoue (井上明久)
- 19th Kazuo Nakajima (中嶋一雄)
- 20th Mitsuo Niinomi (新家光雄)
- 21st Koki Takanashi (高梨弘毅)
- 22nd Tadashi Furuhara (古原忠)

=== Researchers ===
Refer to this page.

The institute has produced many world-famous researchers. Akihisa Inoue, the 18th president of Tohoku University, is well-known for his work on bulk metallic glasses. The Institute of Scientific Information (ISI) has named him as one of the most cited researchers in materials science and engineering, with just two of his publications being the 2nd and 8th most highly-cited in the field. Inoue was awarded the 2006 Prime Minister's Prize for this research, and the 2009 James C. McGroddy Prize for New Materials from the American Physical Society.

== Facilities and laboratories ==
Refer to this page.

== Address ==
1-1-2-chome, Katahira, Aoba-ku, Sendai, Miyagi 980-8577 JAPAN

== See also ==
- Tohoku University
- Research Institute of Electronic Communication
- Institute of Development, Aging and Cancer
