= International Decade of Sciences for Sustainable Development =

The International Decade of Sciences for Sustainable Development was proclaimed by the 77th session of the United Nations General Assembly, held on 25 August 2023, for the years 2024 to 2033. The declaration of the decade was one of the main outcomes of the International Year of Basic Sciences for Sustainable Development (IYBSSD).

The international decade seeks to tackle pressing global challenges, including climate change, biodiversity loss, the increasing frequency of natural and human-made disasters, and growing social inequalities. This initiative underscores the importance of a more inclusive, interdisciplinary scientific approach across all fields to enhance problem-solving. Its objectives will be achieved by integrating citizen science and transdisciplinary research into the scientific process.

The secretariat for the decade is hosted by UNESCO in Paris. In addition to members from various UN bodies, the executive committee has representatives from the World Federation of Engineering Organizations, The Earth-Humanity Coalition, and the International Science Council.

Local communities, universities, organizations and governments around the world are preparing actions to respond to the challenges put forward.
