= The Earth-Humanity Coalition =

The Earth-Humanity Coalition, formed in April 2024, is a group of organizations that have joined efforts to answer the call by the United Nations General Assembly, following the resolution promulgating 2024–2033 as the International Decade of Sciences for Sustainable Development. In close collaboration with UNESCO, the coalition works towards the development of transdisciplinary research, promoting the use of all sciences and all knowledge for global equity on a healthy planet, for sustainable development. Among others, the coalition aims to create a worldwide network of thousands of transdisciplinary nodes that will be active, at all levels, with a function to address the challenges facing humanity in the 21st century.

The coalition is led by a steering committee, chaired by Michel Spiro.
