= International Year of Basic Sciences for Sustainable Development =

United Nations observance

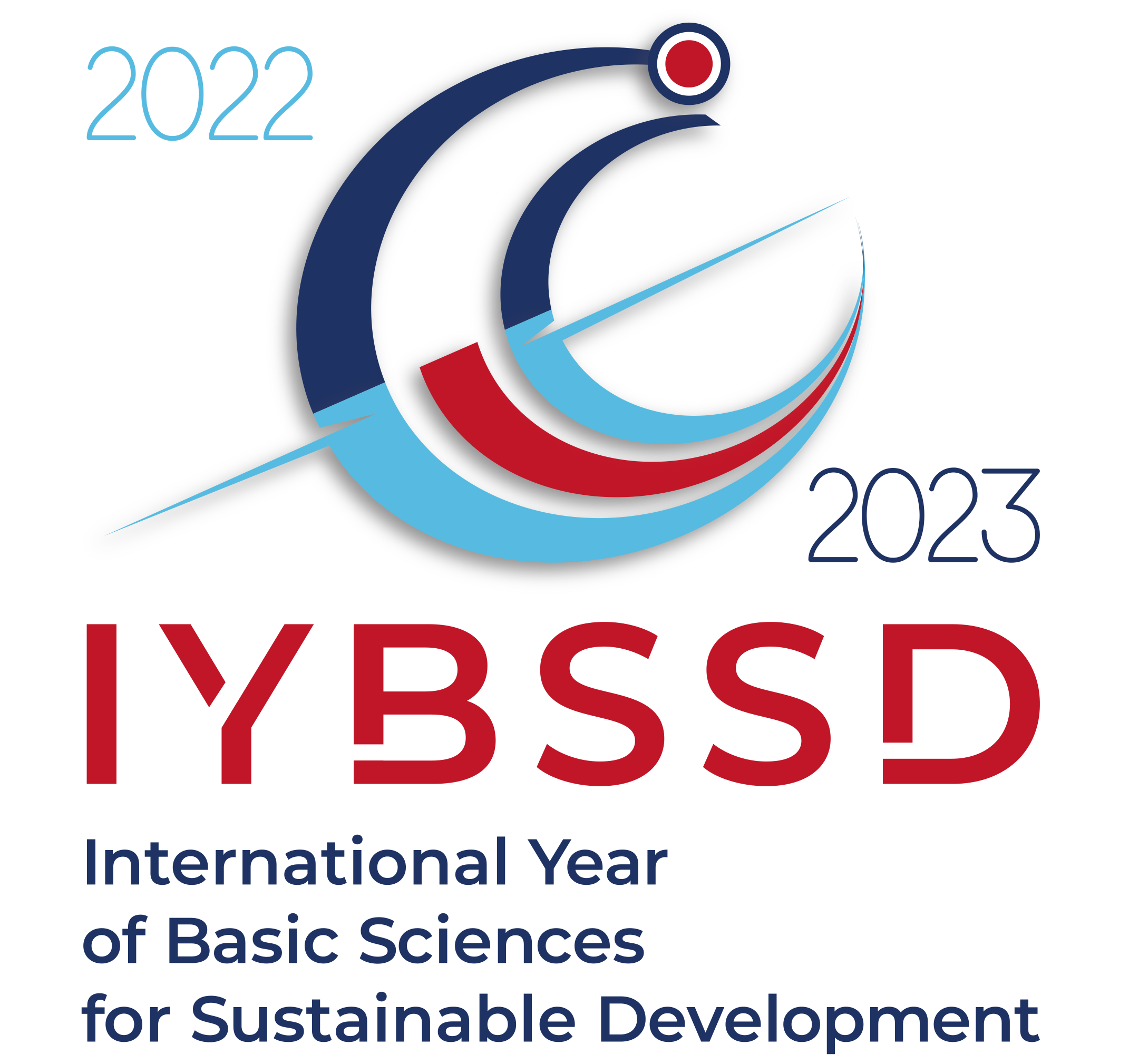
- Duration: 18 months
- Also known as: IYBSSD
- Organised by: UNESCO, IUPAP, CERN and their associated organizations and federations across the world.
- Website: https://www.iybssd2022.org/en/home/

The International Year of Basic Sciences for Sustainable Development was proclaimed by the 76th session of the United Nations General Assembly 2 December 2021 for 2022, stressing that the applications of basic sciences are vital for advances in medicine, industry, agriculture, water resources, energy planning, environment, communications and culture, and that basic sciences rupture technologies respond to the needs of humankind by providing access to information and increasing societal well-being, and promoting peace through improved collaboration toward Sustainable Development Goals (SDGs).

The official opening ceremony of the year took place in UNESCO headquarters in Paris on 8 July 2022 and the official closure took place at CERN in Geneva on 15 December 2023, so in the end the UN observance lasted six months longer than initially foreseen.

The International Union of Pure and Applied Physics (IUPAP) and 28 other science unions and organizations constituted a Steering Committee, chaired by Michel Spiro with vice chairs Jean Trần Thanh Vân, and Prajval Shastri, which goal from 2017 was to promote the proclamation by the United Nations General Assembly of 2022 as the International Year for Basic Science for Sustainable Development.

Over 80 other organizations, among them many national science academies and their networks, supported the initiative.

UNESCO acted as the lead agency and focal point for the Year. The programme for the Year is developed in collaboration with other relevant entities of the UN system, IUPAP, CERN, and their associated organizations and federations across the world. A series of regional and international events took place, among others the flagship events “Science, Ethics and Human Development” in Vietnam and the “World Conference on Basic Sciences and Sustainable Development” in Serbia.

Following the International Year of Basic Sciences for Sustainable Development (IYBSSD), the United Nations General Assembly proclaimed 2024 to 2033 as the International Decade of Sciences for Sustainable Development (IDSSD).
