= Silvina Ponce Dawson =

Argentine physicist

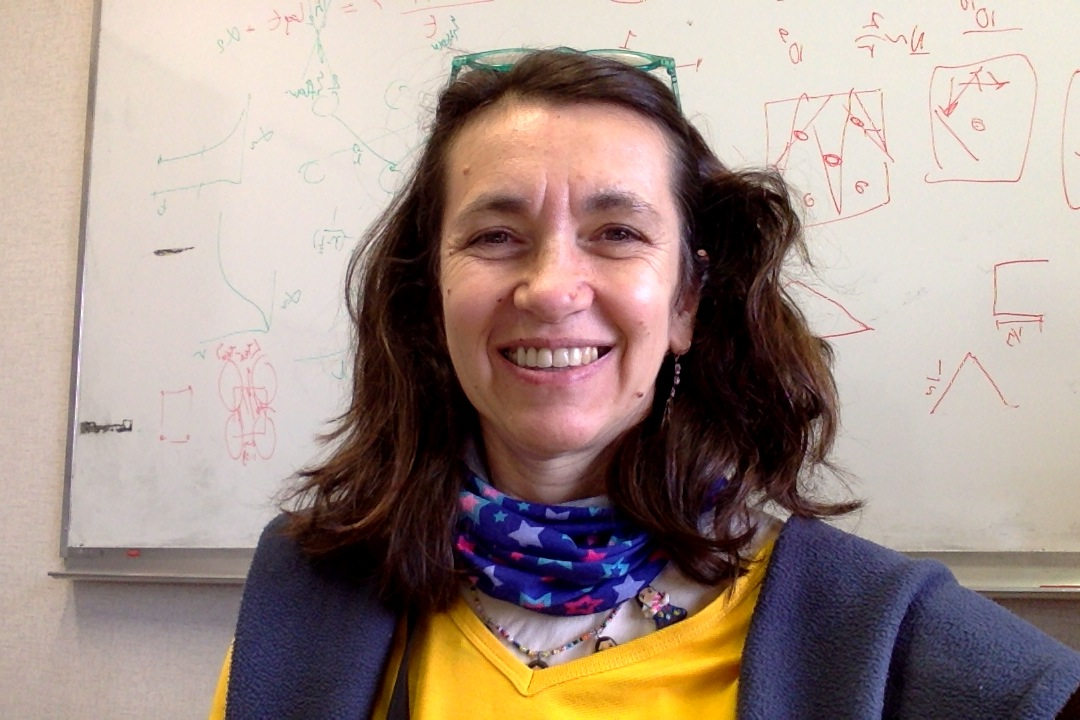
- Education: University of Buenos Aires
- Scientific career
- Fields: Physics Biophysics
- Workplaces: University of Buenos Aires; CONICET Los Alamos National Laboratory; University of Maryland International Union of Pure and Applied Physics
- Thesis: Un modelo de turbulencia de Alfven en plasmas (1988)
- Doctoral advisor: Constantino Ferro Fontán

Silvina Martha Ponce Dawson is an Argentine physicist specialized in biophysics and a full professor at the Faculty of Exact and Natural Sciences of the University of Buenos Aires (UBA), and senior researcher at the National Scientific Research Council (CONICET). In October 2024 she was elected to preside the International Union of Pure and Applied Physics (IUPAP) for the period 2025 to 2027. Her main research interests are biological and statistical physics. She is the author of more than 100 articles that have appeared in scientific journals and conference proceedings.

== Research career ==
Silvina Ponce Dawson received the Licenciatura and Ph.D. degrees in physics from the University of Buenos Aires, Argentina, in 1983 and 1988, respectively.

She was a research assistant with the University of Maryland from 1989 to 1991 and at the Los Alamos National Laboratory from 1991 to 1994. Ponce Dawson returned to the University of Buenos Aires in 1994 as an assistant professor, where she became full professor in 2017.

Ponce Dawson is a research associate of the International Center for Theoretical Physics (ICTP) in Trieste, Italy, and an associate member of ICTP-SAIFR, Sao Paulo, Brazil. She is divisional associate editor of Physical Review Letters, and she was a member of the Advisory Council of the National Program for Gender Equality of the Ministry of Science of Argentina (comité asesor del Programa de Igualdad de Género del Ministerio de Ciencia de Argentina). She was director of the Faculty of Physics of the UBA from 2005 to 2009 and in charge of extension activities in the period between 2010 and 2016.

== International engagement ==
In October 2017, she was elected IUPAP vice-president at large, designate president in 2021, and finally president in 2024 for the period 2025 to 2027. Ponce Dawson was chair of the IUPAP Working Group on Women in Physics from 2011 to 2014, and the IUPAP gender champion from 2017 to 2019. She was member of the Executive Committee of the ICSU-funded Gender Gap in Science Project. She also co-edited a book on the gender gap in STEM in Latin America. She is a member of the advisory committee for the Program on Gender Equality of the Argentinian Ministry of Science.

Ponce Dawson is a member of the steering committee for the 2025 International Year of Quantum Science and Technology.
