= Michel E. Goldberg =

French biophysicist

- Born: 1938 (age 87–88); France
- Education: Ecole Polytechnique, Pasteur Institute
- Relatives: Michel Spiro (brother-in-law); Marc Goldberg (son)
- Scientific career
- Fields: Biophysics
- Institutions: Paris University, Pasteur Institute
- Doctoral advisor: Jacques Monod

Michel E. Goldberg is a French biophysicist who specialized in the study of protein folding and aggregation. He spent most of his scientific career at the Pasteur Institute, becoming a laboratory head in 1972 and serving as the Scientific Director from 1976 to 1979. He also held a variety of roles with the Pasteur-Weizmann Council, a partnership between the Pasteur Institute in France and the Weizmann Institute in Israel. Goldberg retired in 2005.

== Early life and education ==
Goldberg was born in France in 1938 to parents of Polish Jewish descent. As a result of the anti-Jewish policies adopted by the Vichy France government in 1940, his family sold their businesses and went into hiding, for a time sending Michel and his brother to live with acquaintances hidden in the countryside in southern France. The family was reunited after the end of the German occupation; Goldberg later recalled being deeply affected by the Holocaust survivors his parents helped to house and support after the end of the war.

Goldberg developed an interest in the then-emerging science of molecular biology in high school. In 1959 he somewhat reluctantly entered the Ecole Polytechnique, which did not then offer much education in biology and whose graduates did not typically seek research careers. Nevertheless, Goldberg eventually secured a place in the laboratory of Jacques Monod, whose prominence Goldberg did not yet recognize when they first met. Goldberg served a year as a statistician in the Air Force before beginning his Ph.D. studies under Monod's supervision. During his studies Goldberg spent two years visiting Stanford University from 1964 to 1966, and eventually finished his Ph.D. in 1967 with a thesis on tryptophan synthase.

== Academic career ==
After graduation, Goldberg assumed a research fellow position at the French National Center for Scientific Research (CNRS), and was subsequently appointed to a professorship at Paris University, where he would remain until 1998. At the same time he continued his work at the Pasteur Institute, becoming a laboratory head in 1972 and professor in 1985. While at the Pasteur Institute, Goldberg served in a number of leadership positions; he was Scientific Director from 1976 to 1979, and held positions on a variety of institutional committees. He is credited with introducing a number of biophysical experimental techniques to other researchers at the Pasteur Institute and with establishing its scientific computing unit. He also served on the Pasteur-Weizmann Council in a variety of positions beginning in 1988, facilitating cooperation between the Pasteur Institute and the Weizmann Institute in Israel. Although Goldberg retired in 2005, he continues to serve in advisory roles with the Pasteur-Weizmann Council and is co-president of the scientific committee for the Pasteur-Weizmann/Servier International Prize. He is also a member of the scientific advisory board of Anima Biotech, along with Barry Cooperman and Ada Yonath.

Goldberg became a member of the European Molecular Biology Organization (EMBO) in 1985. The CNRS later recognized Goldberg and Jeannine Yon as among the first to study the protein folding problem in France.
