= International Union of Pure and Applied Physics =

Non-governmental organization for physics development

- Abbreviation: IUPAP
- Formation: 1922; 104 years ago
- Type: International
- Legal status: Active
- Purpose: To stimulate and facilitate international cooperation in physics and the worldwide development of science
- Headquarters: Geneva, with an administrative office in Trieste
- Location: Switzerland
- Region served: Worldwide
- Members: International Science Council
- Official language: English
- President: Silvina Ponce Dawson
- Main organ: Executive Council
- Website: iupap.org

The International Union of Pure and Applied Physics (IUPAP; /ˈaɪjuːpæp, ˈjuː-/) is an international non-governmental organization whose mission is to assist in the worldwide development of physics, to foster international cooperation in physics, and to help in the application of physics toward solving problems of concern to humanity. It was established in 1922 and the first General Assembly was held in 1923 in Paris. The Union is domiciled in Geneva, Switzerland.

IUPAP carries out this mission by: sponsoring international meetings; fostering communications and publications; encouraging research and education; fostering the free circulation of scientists; promoting international agreements on the use of symbols, units, nomenclature and standards; and cooperating with other organizations on disciplinary and interdisciplinary problems.Therefore it is very important .

IUPAP is a member of the International Science Council.

IUPAP was the lead organization promoting the adoption of the International Year of Basic Sciences for Sustainable Development, which eventually was proclaimed by the 76th session of the United Nations General Assembly 2 December 2021 for 2022.

== History ==
In 1919 was formed the International Research Council "was largely through the representatives of the National Academy of Sciences, Washington, and of the Royal Society, London, to coordinate international efforts in the different branches of sciences, under whose aegis international associations or unions in different branches of science could be formed".

By this principle, the 1922 General Assembly of the IRC convened at Brussels and a number of physicists present decided that the formation of a Physics Union was imperative.

Thirteen countries (Belgium, Canada, Denmark, France, Netherlands, Empire of Japan, Norway, Poland, Spain, Switzerland, United Kingdom, United States, and Union of South Africa) immediately announced their adherence to the new Union.

An Executive committee was formed which undertook to prepare rules, regulations, and activities of the organization. The committee consisted of ten distinguished physicists: W.H. Bragg, M. Brillouin, O.M. Corbino, M. Knudsen, M. Leblanc, R.A. Millikan, H. Nagaoka, E. Van Aubel, and H. Abraham. The committee had Bragg as President, Van Aubel as Vice-President, and Abraham as Secretary. This was the birth of the International Union of Pure and Applied Physics.

The year 2022 marked the centenary of IUPAP, organized and run by the physics communities of the world. In this context, IUPAP sponsored the publication of Globalizing Physics: One Hundred Years of the International Union of Pure and Applied Physics, edited by Roberto Lalli and Jaume Navarro. This anthology brings together contributions to the history of IUPAP since its foundation.

== Committees and governance ==
The Union is governed by its General Assembly, which meets every three years. The Council is its top executive body, supervising the activities of the nineteen specialized International Commissions and the four Affiliated Commissions – it typically meets once or twice per year. The Union is composed of Members representing identified physics communities. At present 60 Members adhere to IUPAP. The Members are represented by Liaison Committees. Members of the Council and Commissions are elected by the General Assembly, based on nominations received from Liaison Committees and existing Council and Commission members.

The IUPAP specialised Commissions are:

- C1. Commission on Policy and Finance
- C2. Commission on Symbols, Units, Nomenclature, Atomic Masses & Fundamental Constants
- C3. Commission on Statistical Physics
- C4. Commission on Astroparticle Physics. The commission was previously known as the Commission on Cosmic Rays.
- C5. Commission on Low Temperature Physics
- C6. Commission on Biological Physics
- C8. Commission on Semiconductors
- C9. Commission on Magnetism
- C10. Commission on the Structure and Dynamics of Condensed Matter
- C11. Commission on Particles and Fields
- C12. Commission on Nuclear Physics
- C13. Commission on Physics for Development
- C14. Commission on Physics Education
- C15. Commission on Atomic, Molecular, and Optical Physics
- C16. Commission on Plasma Physics
- C17. Commission on Laser Physics and Photonics
- C18. Commission on Mathematical Physics
- C19. Commission on Astrophysics
- C20. Commission on Computational Physics

The Affiliated Commissions are:

AC1. International Commission for Optics

AC2. International Commission on General Relativity and Gravitation

AC3. International Commission for Acoustics

AC4. International Commission on Medical Physics

AC5. International Association of Physics Students

AC6. History and Philosophy of Physics

In addition IUPAP has established a number of Working Groups, among others the International Committee for Future Accelerators (WG1) and Women in Physics (WG5), to provide an overview of important areas of international collaboration in physics.

== Sponsored conferences ==
Each year, IUPAP endorses approximately 30 international conferences and awards grants to the majority of them. Applications for sponsorship can be made via the IUPAP website.

Sponsored conferences fall into four categories:

General Conferences - Type A

These provide a broad overview of an entire field (typically the field of interest to a Commission), and normally occur at two- or three-year intervals, as advances in the field warrant. Attendance in the range of 750–1000 would be anticipated.

Topical Conferences - Type B

These concentrate on broad sub-fields (e.g. nuclear spectroscopy, nuclear reaction mechanisms, heavy ion physics, are possible sub-fields in the field of Nuclear Physics). They would normally be scheduled in the years between the corresponding Type A General conferences. Attendance in the range of 300-600 individuals would be anticipated.

Special Conferences - Type C

These concentrate on much more specialised topics than in the case of Type B Conferences (e.g. angular correlations, lifetime measurements, neutron resonance studies in the field of Nuclear Physics). Attendance in the range of 50-200 would be anticipated.

Workshops in Developing Countries - Type D

These concentrate on meeting the needs of a developing region. Unlike the Type A, B and C conferences, they do not need to be truly international, but should involve neighbouring countries, and they should address the needs of the region. One Type D conference will be approved each year. All applications for Type-D Conferences must be submitted to the Commission on Physics for Development (C13).

== Sponsored awards ==
IUPAP commissions sponsor various awards for scientists. These include:

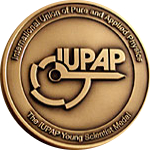
IUPAP Young Scientist Medal.

- The IUPAP Young Scientist Prize, approved and adopted at the 2005 General Assembly for all commissions. The prize was renamed Early Career Scientist Prize at the General Assembly 2021.
- The SUNAMCO Medal, given by the Commission on Symbols, Units, Nomenclature, Atomic Masses and Fundamental Constants (C2)
- The Boltzmann Medal, awarded by the Commission on Statistical Physics (C3)
- The Shakti Duggal Award, established in 1983, to recognize outstanding work by a young scientist in the field of cosmic ray physics, awarded by the Commission on Astroparticle Physics (C4), on behalf of the Bartol Research Institute.
- The Yodh Prize, awarded by the Commission on Astroparticle Physics (C4) on behalf of the University of California Irvine Foundation
- The Fritz London Memorial Prize, given by the Commission on Low Temperature Physics (C5)
- The Young Author Best Paper Award, established by the Commission on Semiconductors (C8) and sponsored by the semiconductor industries of USA, Japan and Europe
- ICM Award in Magnetism, established by the Commission on Magnetism (C9)
- The Kennedy Reed Medal for Outstanding Contributions to the Enhancement of Physics in Developing Countries (C13)
- The ICPE Medal, sponsored by the Commission on Physics Education (C14)
- Penning Award Excellence in Low-Temperature Plasma Physics, established by the Commission on Plasma Physics (C16)
- ICO Prize, awarded by the Affiliated Commission for Optics (AC1)
- ICO Galileo Galilei Award, awarded by the Affiliated Commission for Optics (AC1)

== Sponsored symposiums and conferences ==
- C3: STATPHYS
- C4: International Cosmic Ray Conference
- C5: International Conference on Low Temperature Physics
- C11: International Conference on High Energy Physics
- C17: Symposium on Laser Physics

== Territorial members ==
IUPAP was founded in 1922 with 13 members: Belgium, Canada, Denmark, France, Netherlands, Empire of Japan, Norway, Poland, Spain, Switzerland, United Kingdom, United States, and South Africa. Since, then many new members have joined the union. Today, IUPAP consists of 56 territorial member.

Below is the list of IUPAP territorial members:

List of the Current and Former Territorial Members of IUPAP
	Country	Shares (2015)	Votes (2015)	Year of Joining	Year of ceasing to be a member	Rejoining (1)	Rejoining (2)
1	Algeria	1	1	2009			
2	Argentina	1	1	1951		1984	
3	Australia	4	3	1925			
4	Austria	2	2	1957			
5	Belgium	4	3	1922			
6	Brazil	8	4	1951			
7	Canada	8	4	1922			
8	Chile	1	1	1984			
9	China-Beijing (PRC)	15	5	1984			
10	China-Taipei (Taiwan)	5	3	1984			
11	Costa Rica	1	1	2009	2017		
12	Croatia	1	1	1993			
13	Cyprus	1	1	2003			
14	Czech Republic	4	3	1993			
15	Denmark	3	2	1922			
16	Estonia	1	1	2002			
17	Ethiopia	1	1	2009	No Voting rights		
18	Finland	3	2	1947			
19	France	15	5	1922			
20	Germany	15	5	1954			
21	Ghana	1	1	?			
22	Greece	1	1	2009			
23	Hungary	3	2	1948			
24	India	8	4	1948			
25	Iran	1	1	?			
26	Ireland	1	1	1966			
27	Israel	2	2	1951			
28	Italy	12	5	1923			
29	Japan	15	5	1922			
30	Jordan	2	1	2018			
31	Korea (ROK)	10	5	1969			
32	Latvia	1	1	2002			
33	Lithuania	1	1	2002			
34	Mexico	2	2	1925			
35	Netherlands	4	3	1922			
36	New Zealand	1	1	1954			
37	Norway	3	2	1922			
38	Pakistan	0	0	1951		2017	
39	Peru	1	1	2009			
40	Philippines	1	1	2009			
41	Poland	4	3	1922			
42	Portugal	1	1	1984			
43	Romania	1	1	1947		1960-87	2009
44	Russia	18	6	1992			
45	Saudi Arabia	1	1	1990			
46	Senegal	1	1	?	No voting rights		
47	Singapore	2	2	2009			
48	Slovakia	1	1	1993			
49	Slovenia	1	1	1993			
50	South Africa	3	2	1922			
51	Spain	8	4	1922			
52	Sweden	8	4	1923			
53	Switzerland	4	3	1922			
54	Tunisia	1	1	2005			
55	United Kingdom	15	5	1922			
56	United States	18	6	1922			
	Bolivia	0	0	1963			
	Bulgaria	0	0	1957			
	Cameroon	1	1	2009	2017		
	Colombia	1	1	2009	2017		
	Cuba	1	1	1969	No voting rights		
	Egypt	1	1	1948	2017		
	East Germany			1960			
	Kenya	1	1	1995	2017		
	Nigeria	0	0	1990			
	Republic of China (membership renewed as China-Taipei)			1934	1984		
	Soviet Union (succeeded by Russia)	18	6	1957	1991		
	Yugoslavia	0	0	1954	1992		

== List of IUPAP Presidents ==
The IUPAP President is the head of the Executive Council. IUPAP Presidents are elected by the General Assembly. During the election of the Executive Council, the future President is also elected to the post of President-Designate. Thus in every Executive Council the current President-Designate will succeed the incumbent President.

Below is the list of IUPAP Presidents since its inception in 1922.

Term	President	Nationality
1922–1931	Sir William Henry Bragg	United Kingdom
1931–1934	Robert Andrews Millikan	United States
1934–1947	Mann Siegbahn	Sweden
1947–1951	Hendrik Anthony Kramers	Netherlands
1951–1957	Sir Nevill Francis Mott	United Kingdom
1957–1960	Edoardo Amaldi	Italy
1960–1963	Homi Jehangir Bhabha	India
1963–1966	Louis Eugène Félix Néel	France
1966–1969	Dmitrii Ivanovich Blokhintsev	Soviet Union
1969–1972	Robert Fox Bacher	United States
1972–1975	Heinz Maier-Leibnitz	Germany
1975–1978	Sir Clifford Charles Butler	United Kingdom
1978–1981	Leonard Sosnowski	Poland
1981–1984	Kai Manne Börje Siegbahn	Sweden
1984–1987	David Allan Bromley	Canada/United States
1987–1990	Larkin Kerwin	Canada
1990–1993	Yuri Andreevich Ossipyan	Russia
1993–1996	Yasatuka Yamaguchi	Japan
1996–1999	Jan S. Nilsson	Sweden
1999–2002	Burton Richter	United States
2002–2005	Yves Pierre Petroff	France
2005–2008	Alan Astbury	Canada
2008–2011	Sukekatsu Ushioda	Japan
2011–2014	Cecilia Jarlskog	Sweden
2014–2017	Bruce McKellar	Australia
2017–2020	Kennedy J. Reed	United States
2020–2024	Michel Spiro	France
2025-2027	Silvina Ponce Dawson	Argentina

== IUPAP reactions to sanctions in science ==
IUPAP, whose mission is to assist in the worldwide development of physics, to foster international cooperation, and to help in the application of physics toward solving problems of concern to humanity, has throughout its history defended the stand that no scientists should be barred from participating in conferences or events on the basis of their nationality or their affiliation. Shortly after the Russian invasion of Ukraine in February 2022, IUPAP issued a statement against the military offensive, while advocating for continued international scientific cooperation. To alleviate sanctions in science and to promote principles and policies for international scientific collaboration, IUPAP offers physicists, including students, from any country around the world, who feel excluded from academic exchange based exclusively on their affiliation and/or country of origin, to apply to use the IUPAP as their affiliation.

== See also ==
- International Union of Pure and Applied Chemistry
