= Research Institute of Electronic Communication =

Japanese research institute

Coordinates: 38°15′11.84″N 140°52′24.68″E

Research Institute of Electronic Communication (電気通信研究所, Denki Tsūshin Kenkyūsyo), abbreviated RIEC, is a research institute for electronic communication affiliated with Tohoku University, Japan. It is one of the national collaborative research institute in Japan.

== Outline ==
In 1935, the institute was established as a research institute affiliated with the Facility of Electronical Engineering of Tohoku University because the importance of electronic communication research had got higher in Japan. The pioneer research, such as the development of the Yagi–Uda antenna and divided anode-type magnetron, laid the foundation of the institute.

It comprises four research divisions with 25 subsections (including 4 subsections allocated for visiting researchers), three research facilities with 13 subsections and one externally sponsored research division with 1 subsection. It is one of the national collaborative research institute in Japan.

== Organization ==
=== Research Divisions ===
==== Information Devices Division ====
- Nano-Photoelectronics
- Computational Materials Informatics
- Quantum-Optical Information Technology
- Solid State Electronics
- Dielectric Nano-Devices
- Plasma Electronics
- Magnetic Devices(Visitor Section)

==== Broadband Engineering Division ====
- Ultrahigh-Speed Optical Communication
- Applied Quantum Optics
- Wireless Info Tech
- Information Storage Systems
- Ultra-Broadband Signal Processing
- Basic Technology for Broadband Communication(Visitor Section)

==== Human Information Systems Division ====
- Electromagnetic Bioinformation Engineering
- Advanced Acoustic Information Systems
- Visual Cognition and Systems
- Communication Environmental Engineering
- Multimodal Computing (Visitor Section)

==== Systems & Software Division ====
- Software Construction
- Computing Information Theory
- Communication Network Systems
- Information Contents
- Information Social Structure (Visitor Section)

=== Research Facilities ===
==== Laboratory for Nanoelectronics and Spintronics ====
- Atomically Controlled Processing
- Semiconductor Spintronics
- Nano-Molecular Devices
- Nano-Spin Memory

==== Laboratory for Brainware Systems ====
- Real-World Computing
- Brain Architecture
- Intelligent Nano-Integration System
- Microarchitecture

==== Research Center for 21st-Century Information Technology ====
- Project Planning Division
- Technology Development Division Mobile Wireless Technology Group
- Storage Technology Group
- Intelligence Archive Group(Visitor Section)

=== Common Research Facilities ===
==== Fundamental Technology Center ====
- Machine Shop Division
- Evaluation Division
- Process Division
- Software Technology Division

=== Administration Office ===
==== General Affairs Group ====
- General Affairs Section
- Cooperative Research Section
- Library Section

==== Accounting Group ====
- Accounting Section
- Purchasing Section

== See also ==
- Tohoku University
- Institute for Materials Research
- Institute of Development, Aging and Cancer

== External links and references ==
- RIEC website
- Tohoku University website
