= Hideo Ohno =

Japanese physicist

- 大野 英男
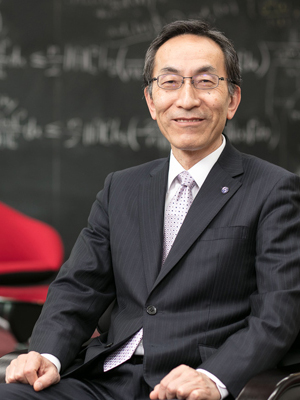
- Hideo Ohno

22nd President of Tohoku University
- Incumbent
- Assumed office April 2018
- Preceded by: Susumu Satomi

Personal details
- Born: December 18, 1954 (age 71) Tokyo
- Citizenship: Japan
- Education: University of Tokyo
- Awards: IEEE David Sarnoff Award (2012); Japan Academy Prize (2005); EPS Europhysics Prize (2005)

Hideo Ohno (Japanese: 大野 英男; Hideo Ōno; born 18 December 1954, Tokyo) is a Japanese physicist. He is the 22nd president of Tohoku University, succeeding Susumu Satomi in April 2018.

== Biography ==
Ohno received B.S., M.S. and Ph.D. degrees from the University of Tokyo in 1977, 1979 and 1982. He spent one year as a visiting graduate student at Cornell University in 1979. He was a lecturer at the School of Engineering at Hokkaido University from 1982 to 1983, and an associate professor from 1983 to 1994. He was a visiting scientist at IBM T. J. Watson Research Center from 1988 to 1990.

In 1994 Ohno was appointed a professor at Tohoku University and a professor at the Research Institute of Electrical Communication (RIEC) from 1995. In 2004 he became the head of the laboratory of Nanoelectronics and Spintronics at Tohoku University. From 2010 until March 2018, Ohno served as the director of the Center for Spintronics Integrated Systems. He was tipped as a possible candidate to receive a Nobel Prize in 2011, for his work in spintronics. Ohno later in 2021 became an international fellow at the Royal Swedish Academy of Engineering Sciences (IVA).

== Awards ==
- 1998 - IBM Japan Science Award
- 2005 - Japan Academy Prize, jointly with Hiroyuki Sakaki for "Studies on Quantum Control of Electrons by Semiconductor Nanostructures and Ferromagnetism"
- 2005 - EPS Europhysics Prize, jointly with David Awschalom and Tomasz Dietl, for their work on ferromagnetic semiconductors and spintronics
- 2011 - Thomson Reuters Citation Laureate
- 2012 - JSAP Outstanding Achievement Award
- 2012 - IEEE David Sarnoff Award, in recognition of his leadership and contribution in the electronics division of the Institute of Electrical and Electronics Engineers (IEEE)
- 2016 - Asian Scientist 100, Asian Scientist
- 2018 - Clarivate Citation Laureate
- 2023 - Doctor Honoris Causa from the University of Warsaw

== Selected publications ==
- Ikeda, S.; Miura, K.; Yamamoto, H.; Mizunuma, K.; Gan, H. D.; Endo, M.; Kanai, S.; Hayakawa, J.; Matsukura, F.; Ohno, H. (August 2010). "A perpendicular-anisotropy CoFeB–MgO magnetic tunnel junction". Nature Materials. 9 (9): 721–724. Bibcode:2010NatMa...9..721I. doi:10.1038/nmat2804. PMID 20622862.
- Ohno, H.; Chiba, D.; Matsukura, F.; Omiya, T.; Abe, E.; Dietl, T.; Ohno, Y.; Ohtani, K. (2000). "Electric-field control of ferromagnetism". Nature. 408 (6815): 944–946. Bibcode:2000Natur.408..944O. doi:10.1038/35050040. PMID 11140674. S2CID 4397543.
- Dietl, T.; Ohno, H.; Matsukura, F; et al. (2000). "Zener model description of ferromagnetism in zinc-blende magnetic semiconductors". Science. 287 (5455): 1019–1022. Bibcode:2000Sci...287.1019D. doi:10.1126/science.287.5455.1019. PMID 10669409. S2CID 19672003.
- Ohno, H. (1998). "Making nonmagnetic semiconductors ferromagnetic". Science. 281 (5379): 951–956. Bibcode:1998Sci...281..951O. doi:10.1126/science.281.5379.951. PMID 9703503.
