= Étienne Klein =

French philosopher of science

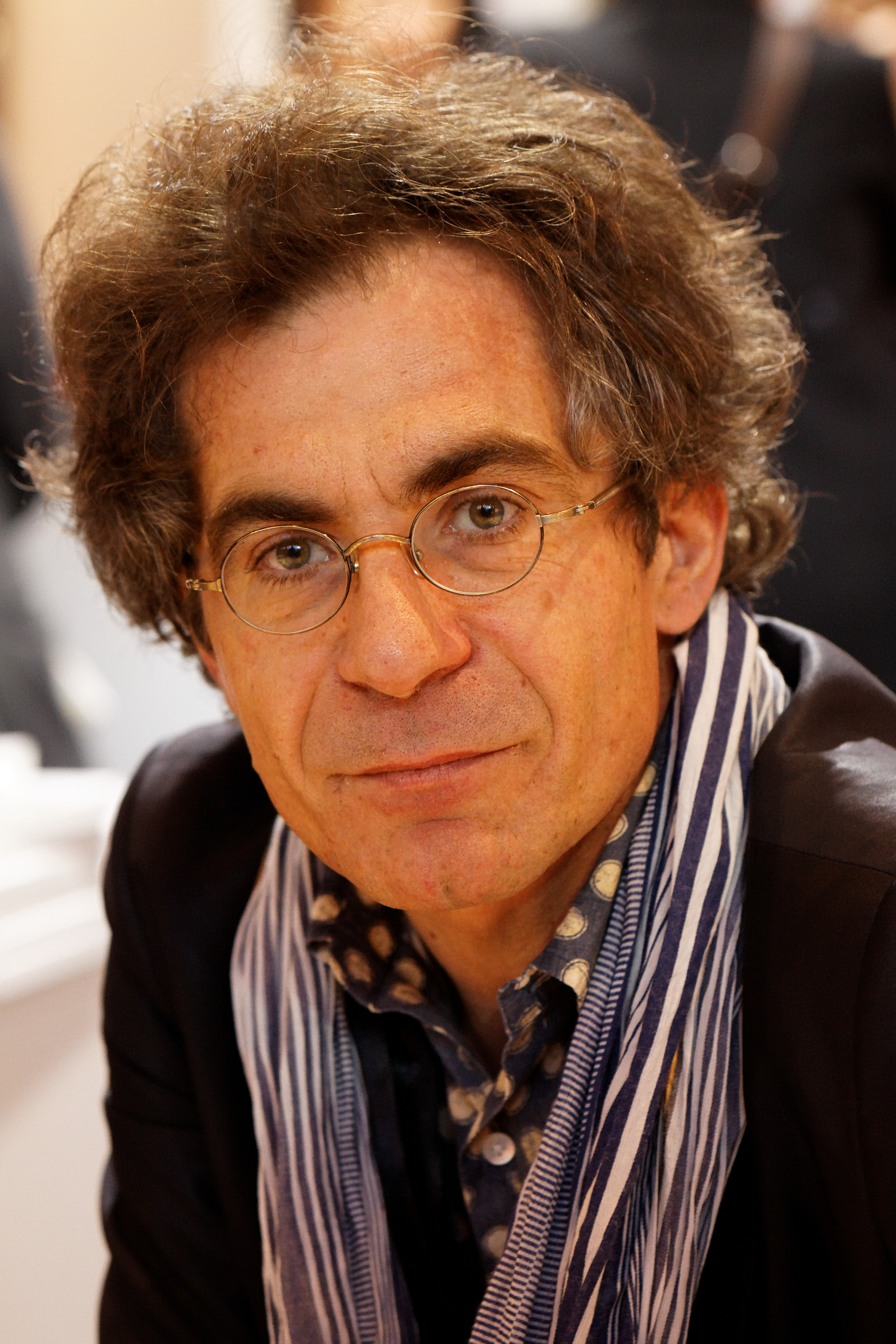
- Born: 1 April 1958 (age 68); Paris, France

Education
- Education: École Centrale Paris

Philosophical work
- Era: 20th-/21st-century philosophy
- Region: Western philosophy

Étienne Klein (French: [klɛ̃]; born 1958) is a French physicist and philosopher of science. A graduate of École Centrale Paris, he holds a DEA (Master of Advanced Studies) in theoretical physics. In June 2026, Université Paris Cité revoked his PhD in philosophy due to extensive plagiarism in his dissertation.

== Profile ==
Étienne Klein is a Research director at the Commissariat à l'énergie atomique et aux énergies alternatives (CEA). He is currently head of the Laboratoire des Recherches sur les Sciences de la Matière (LARSIM), a research laboratory belonging to the CEA and located in Saclay near Paris. He took part in several major projects, such as the adjustment of a method of isotopic separation involving the use of lasers, and the study of a particle accelerator with superconducting cavities. At CERN he was involved in the design of the Large Hadron Collider (LHC).

He taught quantum physics and particle physics at Centrale Paris for several years and currently teaches philosophy of science. He is a specialist in the question of time in physics and has written a number of essays on the subject. He is also a member of the Conseil d'analyse de la société, of the conseil scientifique de la Cité des Sciences, of the Conseil de l'Office parlementaire d'évaluation des choix scientifiques et technologiques (OPECST), of the French Academy of Technologies and of the Conseil d'Orientation de l'Institut Diderot. Every Thursday morning he presents a radio chronicle, Le Monde selon Étienne Klein, as well as La Conversation scientifique every Saturday afternoon, on the French public station France Culture.

Étienne Klein practises mountain-climbing and other endurance sports.

== Plagiarism affairs ==
In December 2016, Science magazine, a publication of the American Association for the Advancement of Science, reported that Étienne Klein was responsible for plagiarizing the novelist Stefan Zweig and other authors.

In August 2024, French media Arrêt sur images revealed that 88 of the 429 pages of the book adapted from his PhD thesis, L’Unité de la physique (2000), contain plagiarized text by Gerald Holton, Lambros Couloubaritsis and other philosophers. After an investigation that lasted 20 months, the Université Paris Cité found Klein to have massively plagiarized in his thesis, leading to them stripping his doctorate degree and barring him from re-registering for obtaining a PhD.

== Chorizo tweet ==
On July 22, 2022, Klein tweeted a photo that he presented as an image of Proxima Centauri, the closest star to the Solar System, taken by the James Webb Space Telescope. A few days later, he revealed that the photo was actually of a slice of chorizo against a black background. He described his tweet as a "form of amusement" and urged his 92,000 Twitter followers to "be wary of arguments from authority". Klein posted the photo a day after Peter Coles posted the same photo as a joke about JWST observations.

== Distinctions and awards ==
- Officier dans l’Ordre des Palmes académiques
- Award for the best scientific book of the year 1993 in Germany for Conversations avec le Sphinx, les paradoxes en physique
- Prix Jean Perrin for popularizing science from the Société française de physique in 1997
- Grammaticakis-Neumann Award from the Académie des sciences in 2000
- Award for the best book of scientific literature of the year for L’Atome au pied du mur et autres nouvelles
- Prix Budget from the Académie des sciences morales et politiques in 2000
- Prix « La science se livre » 2003 for Les Tactiques de Chronos
- Prix Jean Rostand in 2004
- Prix Thorel for Galilée et les Indiens. Allons-nous liquider la science ? in 2008
- Chevalier de la Légion d’honneur, promotion du 1er janvier 2010
- Prix Thorel from the Académie des sciences morales et politiques in 2010

== Bibliography ==
- Conversations avec le Sphinx, les paradoxes en physique, 1991
- Regards sur la matière. Des quanta et des choses, avec Bernard d'Espagnat, 1993
- Le Temps, 1995
- Le Temps et sa flèche [actes du colloque], dir. Étienne Klein and Michel Spiro, 1996
- L’Atome au pied du mur et autres nouvelles, 2000
- L’Unité de la physique, 2000
- La Quête de l’unité. L’Aventure de la physique, with Marc Lachièze-Rey, 2000
- Sous l’atome, les particules
- La Physique quantique
- Trésor des sciences : dictionnaire des concepts, co-author (dir. Michel Serres)
- Moi, U235 noyau radioactif, with Bernard Bonin and Jean-Marc Cavedon, 2001
- Le temps existe-t-il ?, Collection Les petites pommes du savoir, 2002
- La science nous menace-t-elle ?, 2003
- Les Tactiques de Chronos, 2003
- Petit voyage dans le monde des quanta, 2004
- Il était sept fois la révolution, Albert Einstein et les autres, 2005
- Le Temps qui passe, 2006
- Le facteur temps ne sonne jamais deux fois, 2007
- Les Secrets de la matière, 2008
- Galilée et les Indiens. Allons-nous liquider la science ?, 2008
- Pourquoi je suis devenu chercheur scientifique, 2009
- Discours sur l’origine de l’univers, 2010
- La Science en jeu, written with Jean-Michel Besnier, Hervé Le Guyader and Heinz Wismann, 2010
- Le Small bang des nanotechnologies, 2011
- Anagrammes renversantes, ou le sens caché du monde, with Jacques Perry-Salkow, 2011
- Rugby quantique, with Jonny Wilkinson and Jean Illiopoulos, 2011
- D'où viennent les idées (scientifiques)?, 2013
- En cherchant Majorana. Le physicien absolu, 02/2015
- Y a-t-il eu un instant zéro ?, 03/2015
- Le pays qu'habitait Albert Einstein, 2016
- Tout n'est pas relatif, 2017
- Sauvons le progrès, dialogue avec Denis Lafay, 2017
- Matière à contredire, essai de philo-physique, 2018
- Le goût du vrai, 2020

== Filmography ==
- Quels temps font-ils ?, co-author with Marc Lachièze-Rey, film directed by Hervé Lièvre, 2001
