= Working Group on Women in Physics =

The Working Group on Women in Physics of the International Union of Pure and Applied Physics (IUPAP) was formed by resolution of the Atlanta IUPAP General Assembly in 1999.

The mandate of the group is:

- to survey the present situation and report to the council and the liaison committees and
- to suggest means to improve the situation for women in physics.

To carry out this charge the Working Group has, among other things, organized six International Conferences (Paris, France, in 2002, Rio de Janeiro, Brazil, in 2005, Seoul, South Korea, in 2008, Stellenbosch, South Africa, in 2011, Waterloo, Canada, in 2014 and Birmingham, UK, in 2017) gathering teams from more than 60 countries that collected data on their local situation of women in physics. It also promoted and collaborated with the elaboration of a global survey of physicists that was carried on by the Statistical Research Center of the American Institute of Physics. The IUPAP Working Group is currently involved in the elaboration of a new survey that will include other natural sciences and mathematics within the framework of the Gender Gap in Science Project funded by the International Council for Science, ICSU.
