= Akihisa Inoue =

Japanese physicist (born 1947)

- 井上明久
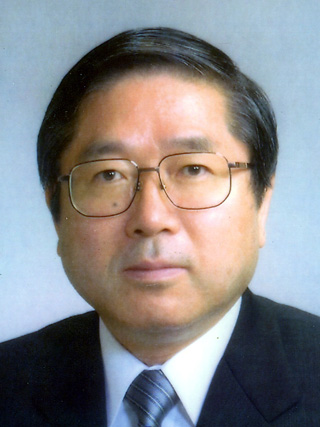
- Born: September 13, 1947 (age 79); Himeji, Japan
- Education: Tohoku University
- Scientific career
- Fields: Materials science
- Workplaces: Tohoku University

Akihisa Inoue (井上明久; born September 13, 1947) is a Japanese physicist. He is a former president of Tohoku University.

His research interests lie in the field of materials science, particularly in the area of metallic glass. The first amorphous steels were discovered by Inoue at Tohoku University in Japan and reached thicknesses of one to two millimeters.

== Career ==
Inoue studied materials science at Tohoku University and graduated in 1972 with a master's degree. In 1975, he received his doctorate in material science and engineering. After graduation, he remained as a research assistant at the Institute for Materials Research. He became an associate professor in 1985 and a full professor at the same institute in 1990. Since April 2000, he has also been director of the Institute for Materials Research.

He was the 20th president of Tohoku University from 2006 to 2012. During his tenure, he was under investigation for retractions of his papers.

Inoue has been a scientific advisor to the Japanese Ministry of Education, Culture, Sports, Science and Technology since April 2001.

== Awards and honors ==
In 2002, he was awarded the Japan Academy Award for his achievements in "stabilization of supercooled metal liquids and the development of bulk metal glass".

He was awarded an honorary doctorate by the Royal Swedish Academy of Engineering Sciences in 2005 and from the Shanghai Jiao Tong University in 2011. He joined the Japan Academy in 2006. He was awarded the James C. McGroddy Prize in 2009.

He was awarded the Grand Cordon of the Order of the Sacred Treasure in 2024.
