= Tohoku University =

University in Sendai, Japan

Coordinates: 38°15′15″N 140°52′25″E

- 東北大学
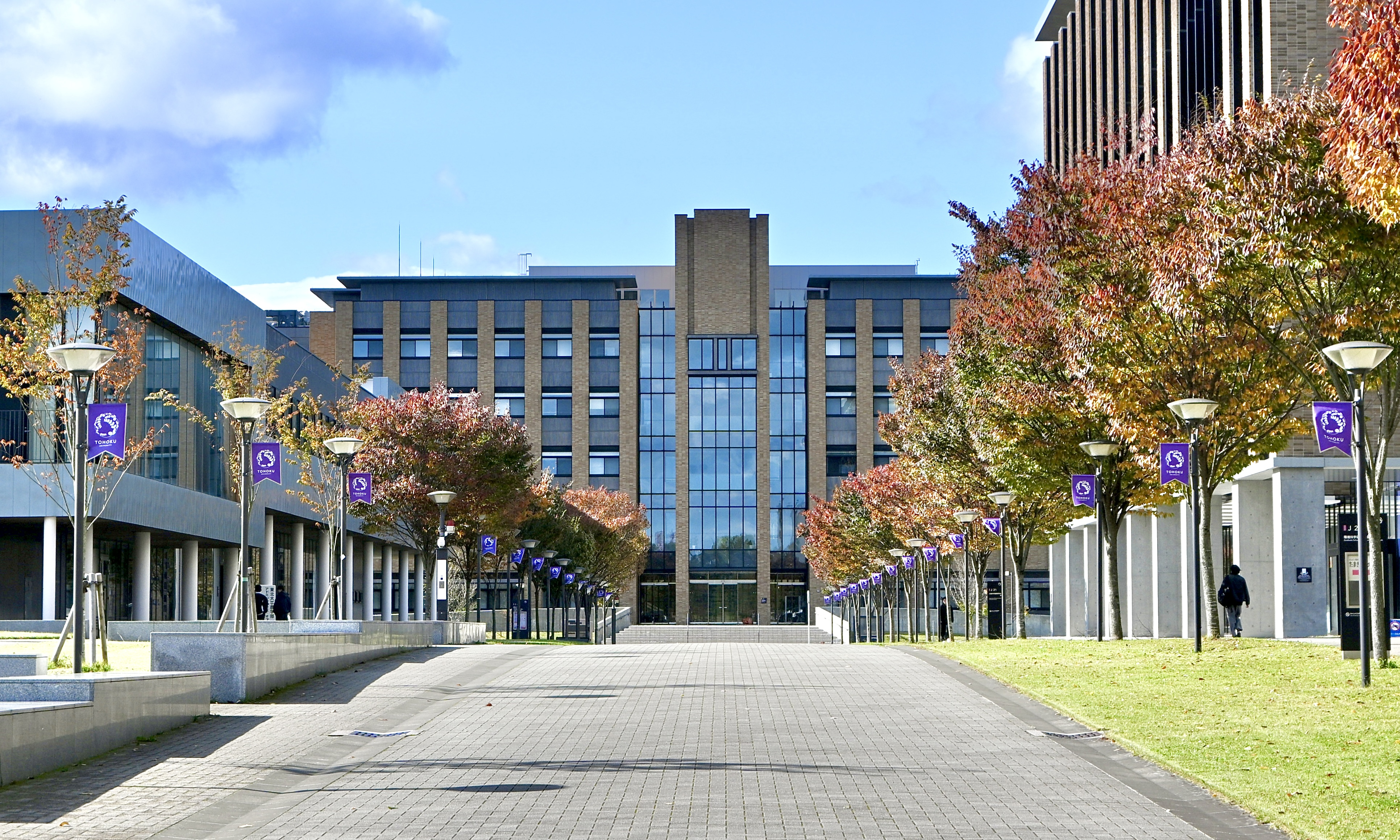
- Motto: 研究第一主義 (research first principle); 門戸開放 (open-door policy); 実学尊重 (respect for practical studies)
- Type: Public (National)
- Established: June 22, 1907
- Academic affiliations: APRU, AEARU, HeKKSaGOn, T.I.M.E., RENKEI
- Endowment: US$1.3 billion (JP¥120.138 billion)
- President: Teiji Tominaga
- Administrative staff: 5,756
- Undergraduates: 11,094
- Postgraduates: 7,704
- Other students: 1,346 (international students)
- Location: Sendai, Miyagi, Japan
- Campus: Urban, 250 ha (620 acres)
- Colors: Violet; Black
- Sporting affiliations: TCAA, SEN6
- Website: tohoku.ac.jp

Tohoku University (東北大学, Tōhoku daigaku) is a public research university in Sendai, Miyagi, Japan. It is colloquially referred to as Tohokudai (東北大, Tōhokudai) or Tonpei (トンペイ, Tonpei).

Established in 1907 as the third of the Imperial Universities, after the University of Tokyo and Kyoto University, it initially focused on science and medicine, later expanding to include humanities studies as well.

In 2016, Tohoku University had 10 faculties, 16 graduate schools and 6 research institutes, with a total enrollment of 17,885 students. The university's three core values are "Research First (研究第一主義)," "Open-Doors (門戸開放)," and "Practice-Oriented Research and Education (実学尊重)."

== History ==
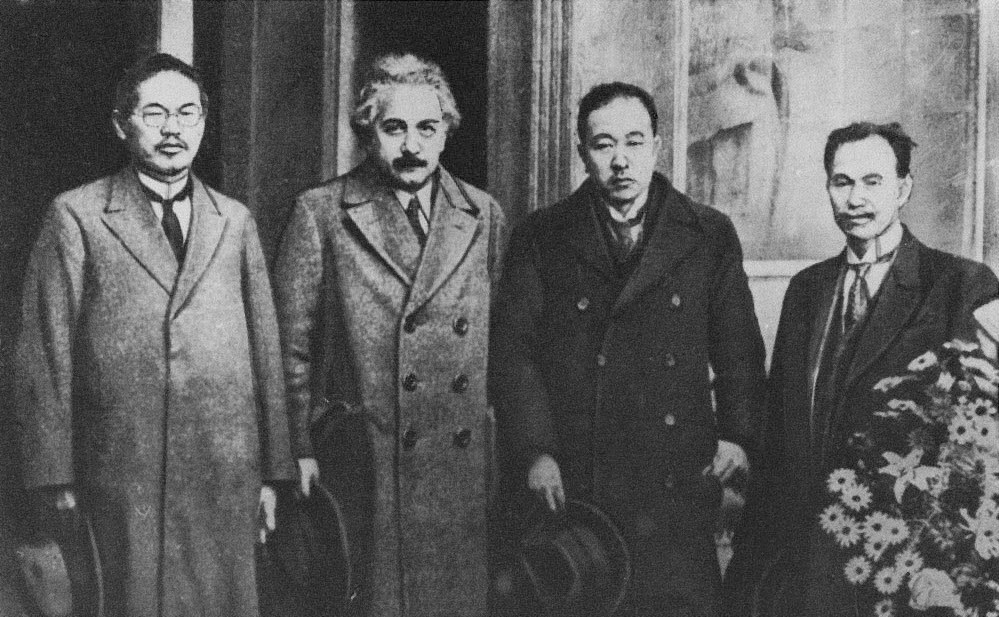
Albert Einstein visiting Tohoku Imperial University in 1922

On 22 June 1907 (Mēji 40), Tohoku Imperial University (東北帝國大學, Tōhoku teikoku daigaku) was established by the Meiji government as the third Imperial University of Japan, after Tokyo Imperial University (1877) and Kyoto Imperial University (1897). From its inception, it advocated 'Open-door' policies, becoming the first university in Japan to accept both female students in 1913, and foreign students.

It was not until 1911 that teaching and research activities started in Sendai. When the university was founded in 1907 it only had one faculty (college), the College of Agriculture, in Sapporo, Hokkaido. This college, originally founded in 1875 as the Sapporo Agricultural College (札幌農學校, Sapporo nō gakkō), precedes the establishment of the university, and in 1918, it became independent to form another imperial university, Hokkaido Imperial University, in its own right. The School of Science was established in Sendai in 1911, followed by the School of Medicine (formerly Sendai Medical College) in 1915, the Faculty of Engineering in 1919, and the Faculty of Law and Literature in 1922.

In 1947, during the post-war educational reform, the university dropped the word 'imperial' along with other imperial universities, and assumed its current name, Tohoku University. It was also this year that the university's academic scope came to cover agriculture again, with the establishment of a new Faculty of Agriculture in Sendai. In 1949, the Faculty of Law and Literature was split to form independent faculties of Law, Literature, and Economics. A Faculty of Education was added in 1949, Dentistry in 1965, and Pharmacy in 1972. Tohoku has been a National University Corporation since April 2004.

=== 2011 Tōhoku earthquake ===
Subsequent to the 2011 Tōhoku earthquake and tsunami, the university was declared closed until further notice, but with a tentative re-opening date of the end of the following April. The Aobayama, Katahira, Amamiya, and Kawauchi campuses are all at least 12 kilometers (7.5 mi) from the ocean, towards the mountains, and therefore suffered no damage resulting from the tsunami. No deaths or serious injuries within the faculty and student body were reported on campus grounds. However, earthquake damage lead to the closure of 27 buildings and caused millions of dollars of damage to equipment. Classes have resumed normally since early May 2011 and plans for restoring, reinforcing or replacing damaged buildings are underway.

== Campuses ==
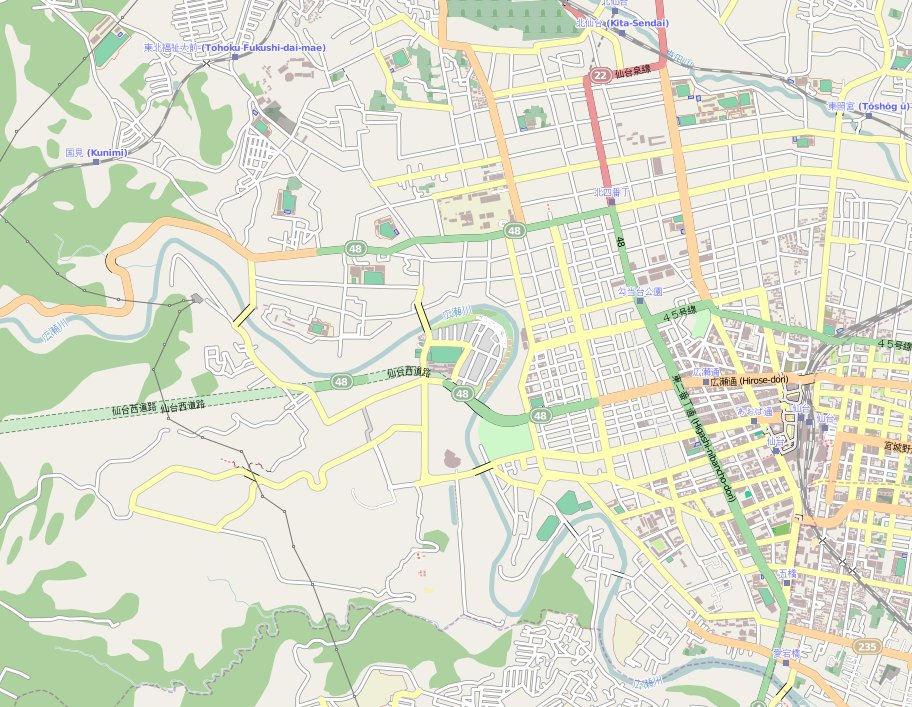
Campus locations

Principal four campuses are in the Sendai City, Japan;

- Katahira (片平, Katahira)

Administration Unit. and Principal institutes

- Kawauchi (川内, Kawauchi)

North-Kawauchi; The freshmen and sophomore of all undergraduates
South-Kawauchi; Law, Education, Economics, Letters

- Seiryo (星陵, Seiryō)

Medicine, Dentistry

- Aobayama (青葉山, Aobayama)

Science, Engineering, Pharmacy, Agriculture

Amamiya campus and some institutes transferred to the new extension at Aobayama campus in April 2017 .

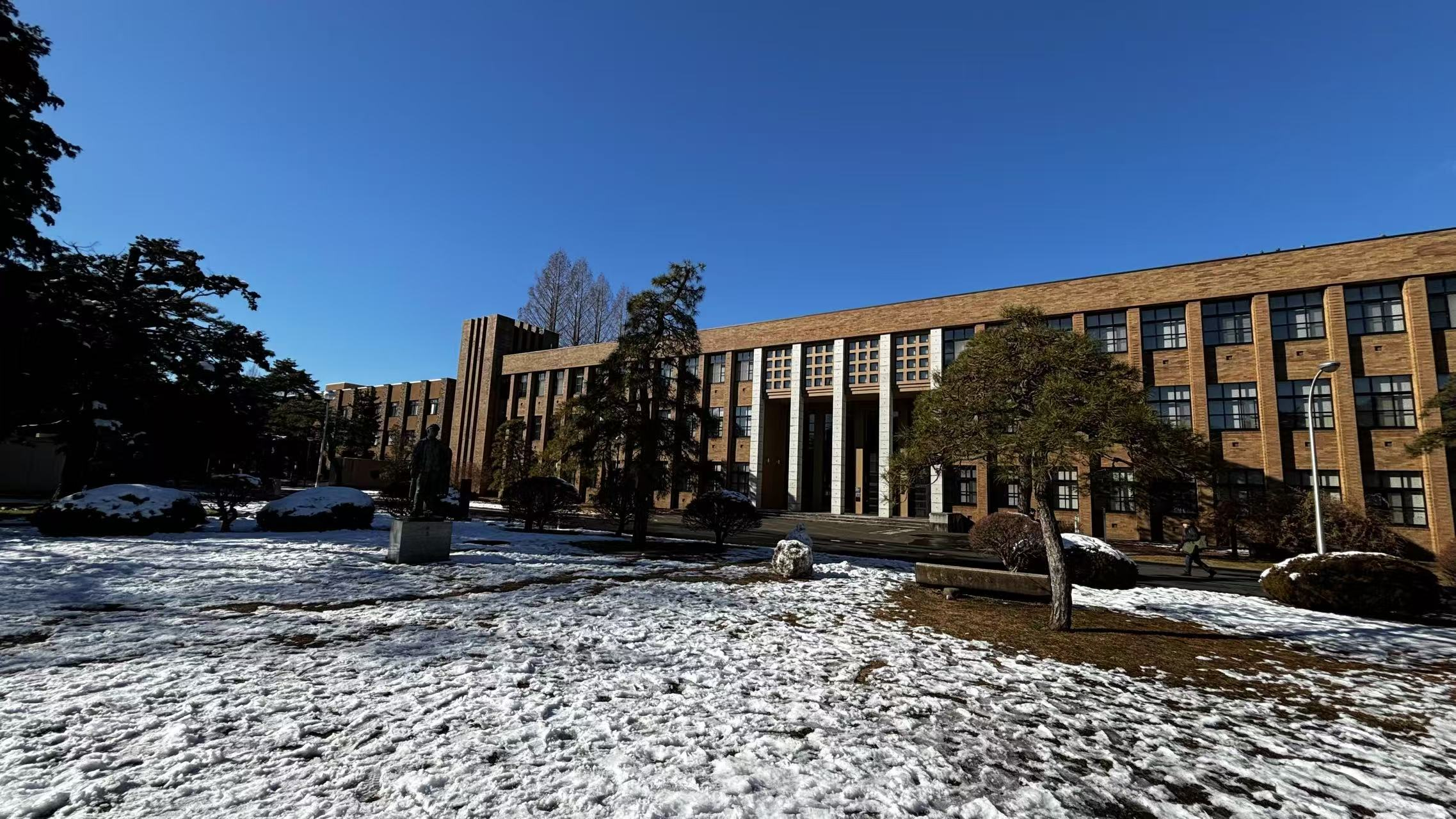
Administration Unit of Tohoku university

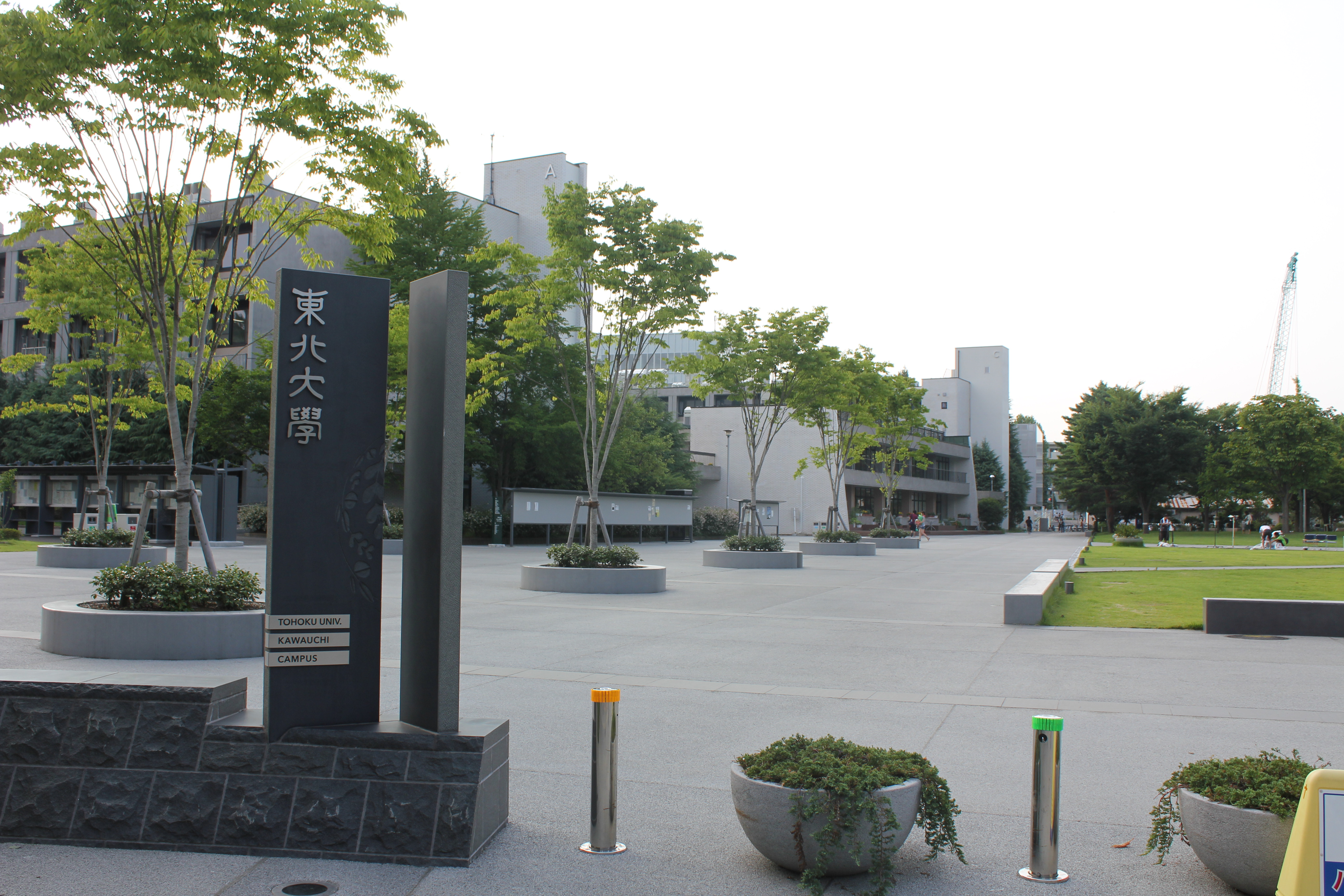
Kawauchi north campus

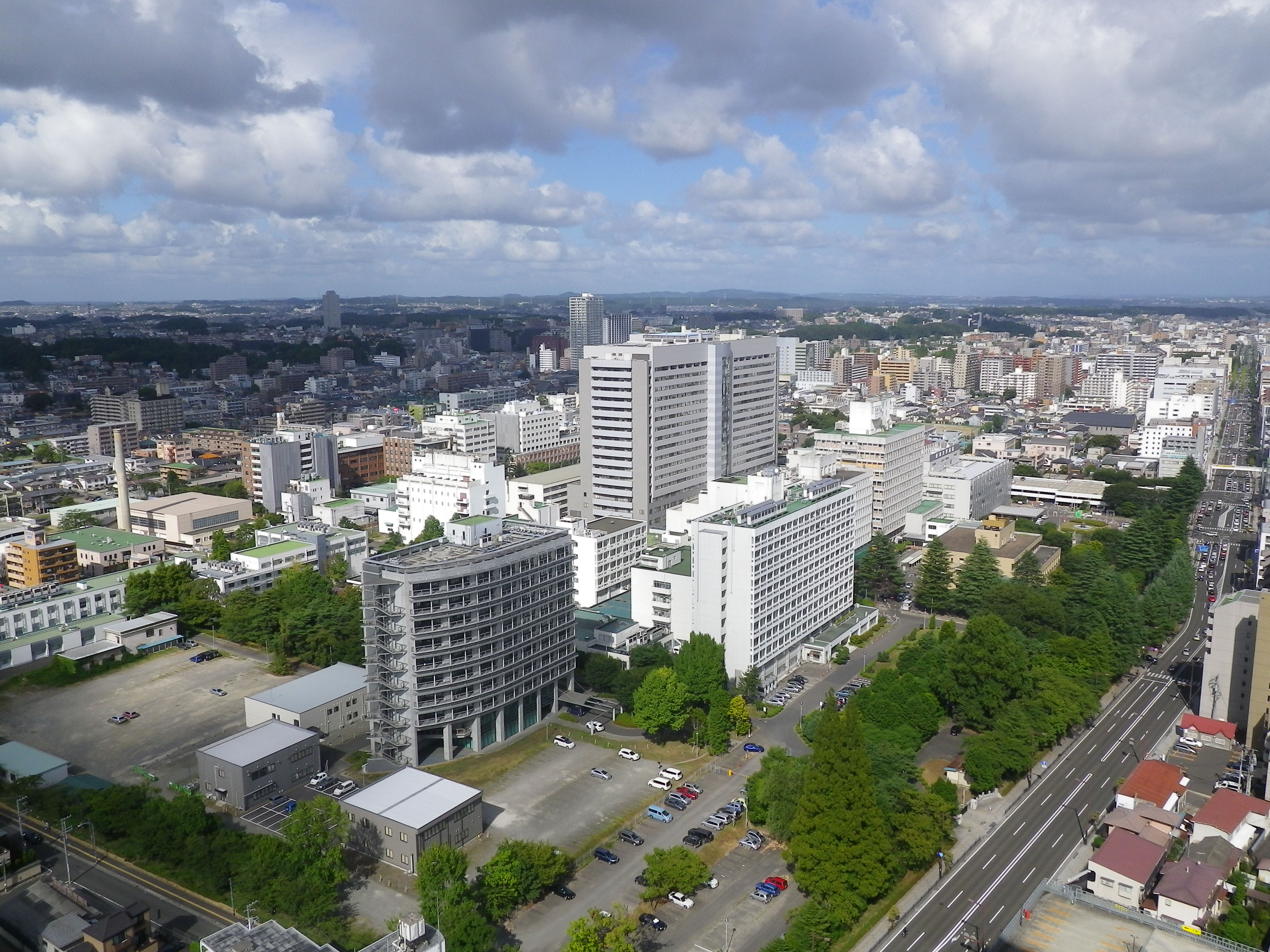
Seiryo campus

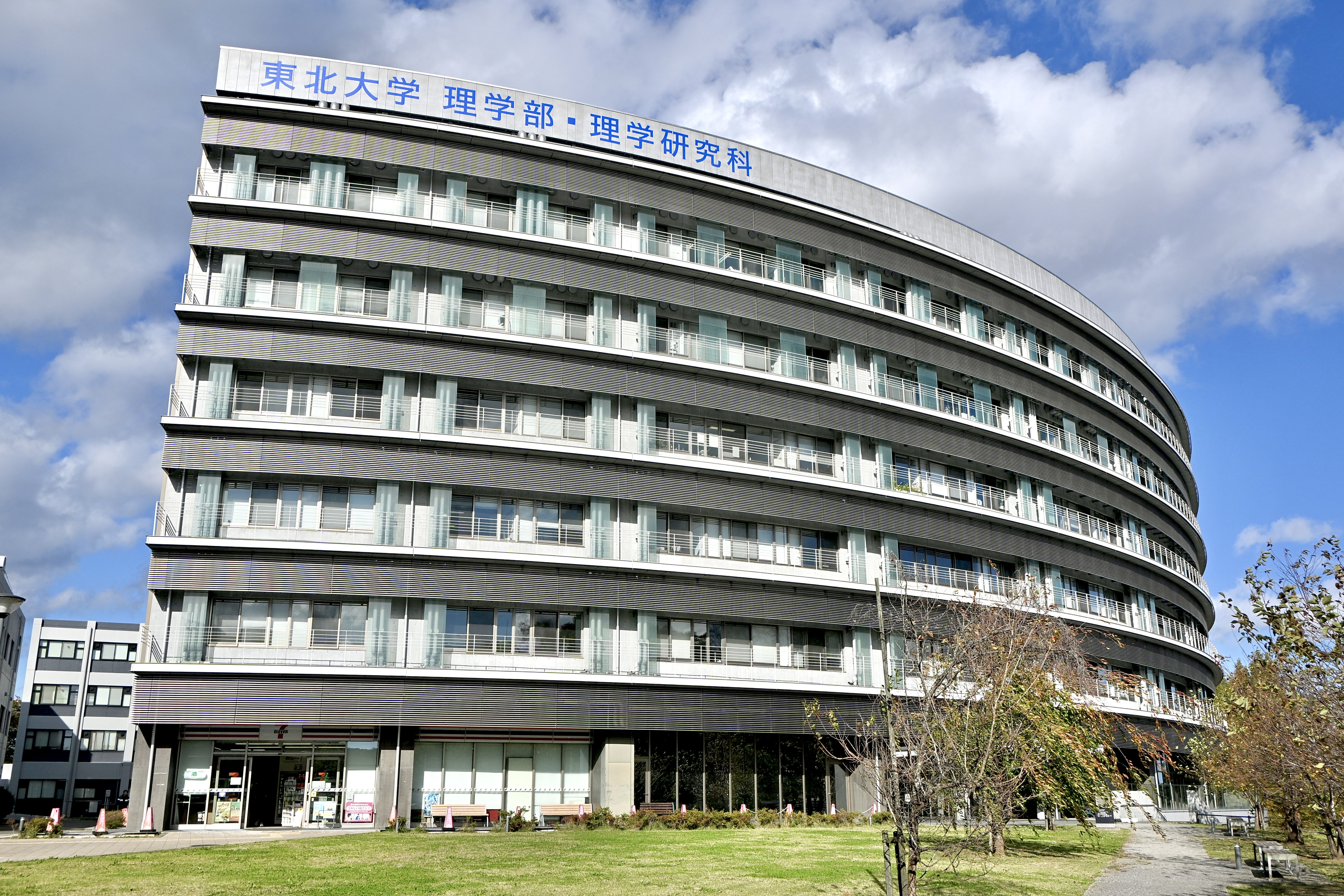
The building of the faculty of science in Aobayama north campus

== Research institutes ==
Tohoku University has several research centers and institutes:

- Institute for Materials Research, IMR (金属材料研究所, 金研, Kinzoku Zairyō Kenkyūjo, Kinken)
- Research Institute of Electrical Communication (電気通信研究所, 通研, Denki Tsūshin Kenkyūsjo, Tsūken)
- Institute of Development, Aging and Cancer (加齢医学研究所, Karei Igaku Kenkyūjo)
- Institute of Fluid Science (流体科学研究所, Ryūtai Kagaku Kenkyūsyo)
- International Center for Synchrotron Radiation Innovation Smart, SRIS (国際放射光 イノベーション･スマート研究センター, Kokusai hōshakō inobēshon sumāto kenkyū sentā)

National Collaborative Research Institute

- Institute of Multidisciplinary Research for Advanced Materials (多元物質科学研究所, Tagen Busshitsu Kagaku Kenkyūjo)
- International Research Institute of Disaster Science (災害科学国際研究所, Saigai Kagaku Kokusai Kenkyūjo)
- Tohoku Medical Megabank Organization (東北メディカル・メガバンク機構, Tōhoku Medikaru Megabanku kikō)

World Premier International Research Center Initiative (WPI)

- Advanced Institutes for Materials Research, AIMR (材料科学高等研究所, Zairyo Kagaku Koutou Kenkyujo)
- Advanced Institutes for Marine Ecosysttem Change, AIMEC (変動海洋エコシステム高等研究所, Hendou Kaiyou Ekoshisutemu Koutou Kenkyujo)

== Centers and facilities ==
=== University library ===
- Tohoku University library
- Medical Library
- Kita-Aobayama Library
- Engineering Library
- Agricultural Library

=== University hospital ===
- Tohoku University Hospital Seiryo

=== Inter-department institutes for education and research ===
- Center for Northeast Asian Studies
- Center for the Advancement of Higher Education
  - Health Administration Center
  - University Counseling Center
  - Admission Center
  - Center for Career Support
  - Center for Culture and Language Education
- The Center for Academic Resources and Archives
  - Tohoku University Museum
  - Tohoku University Archives
  - Tohoku University Botanical Gardens
- Institute for International Advanced Research and Education Organization
- Cyclotron and Radioisotope Center
- New Industry Creation Hatchery Center (NICHe)
- Center for Interdisciplinary Research
- Technology Center for Research and Education Activities
  - Center for Low-Temperature Science
  - High-Voltage Electron Microscope Laboratory
- Information Synergy Organization
  - Information Synergy Center (National Collaboration Institution)

=== Collaborating institutions ===
- Office of Cooperative Research and Development
- Office for Strategic Promotion of Basic Research
- Center for Research Strategy and Support(CRESS)
- Environment Conservation Research Institute
- Center for International Exchange
- Archaeological Research office on the Campus
- Global Operations center
- Campus Planning office

=== Tohoku University Overseas Office ===
Tohoku University US Office
Tohoku University China Office

=== e-learning system ===
- Internet School of Tohoku University (ISTU)

== Dormitories ==
- Ibun-ryo (以文寮, Ibun ryō)
- Josyun-ryo (如春寮, Josyun ryō)
- Seifu-ryo (霽風寮, Seifū ryō)
- Nissyu-ryo (日就寮, Nissyū ryō)
- Meizen-ryo (明善寮, Meizen ryō)
- Matsukaze-ryo (松風寮, Matsukaze ryō)
- University House Sanjo (ユニバーシティ・ハウス三条, University House Sanjo)
- University House Aobayama (ユニバーシティ・ハウス青葉山, University House Aobayama)
- International House (国際交流会館, Kokusai kōryū kaikan)

== Academic rankings ==
University rankings
Global
THE	General	103=
THE Reputation	General	87
QS	General	102
ARWU	Research	201–300
Nature Index Academic	Research	104

Regional
THE Asia (Asia version)	General	21
QS Asia (Asia version)	General	25
ARWU Asia	Research	8

National

Tohoku University has a high reputation, and this is recognised as shown in the rankings below.

=== General rankings ===
In the Times Higher Education World University Rankings 2026, it is ranked 103rd globally, making it the third-highest-ranking university in Japan, after the University of Tokyo (26th) and Kyoto University (61st). The Times Higher Education Japan University Rankings, which is entirely based on teaching, resources, educational outcome, environment, and engagement, unlike the world university rankings, placed Tohoku University 1st in Japan in 2020, 2021, 2022, 2023, and 2025 (no ranking in 2024).

In the QS World University Rankings 2026, Tohoku University is ranked 109th globally and fifth in Japan, after UTokyo, KyotoU, OsakaU, and Science Tokyo.

=== Subject rankings ===
QS World University Rankings by Subject 2024
Subject	Global	National
Arts & Humanities	▲ =268	▼7
Linguistics	▼201–250	▼7–9
Archaeology	151–200	5–6
Architecture and Built Environment	▼151–200	▼5–7
History	▲101–150	▲4–6
Modern Languages	▲101–150	▼6
Engineering and Technology	▼89	4
Engineering – Chemical	101–150	4–7
Engineering – Civil and Structural	151–200	4–5
Computer Science and Information Systems	201–250	▼7
Engineering – Electrical and Electronic	▲ =111	4
Engineering – Mechanical	▼ =85	▼4
Life Sciences & Medicine	▲ =155	4
Agriculture and Forestry	101–150	5
Anatomy and Physiology	▲51–100	3–4
Biological Sciences	151–200	4–7
Dentistry	51–100	2–4
Medicine	▼ =167	6
Pharmacy and Pharmacology	151–200	3–6
Natural Sciences	▼ =97	▼5
Chemistry	▼ =101	▼6–7
Earth and Marine Sciences	101–150	3–6
Environmental Sciences	▼201–250	5–6
Geology	101–150	3–6
Geophysics	101–150	3–6
Materials Sciences	▼ =50	▼4
Mathematics	151–200	4–7
Physics and Astronomy	50	▼5
Social Sciences & Management	▲ =295	▼8
Economics and Econometrics	▲351–400	11
Law and Legal Studies	▲201–250	▲7–8
Sociology	151–200	▼5
Statistics and Operational Research	201–250	▼5

THE World University Rankings by Subject 2024
Subject	Global	National
Arts & humanities	▼251–300	4
Clinical & health	▲126–150	4
Computer science	▲126–150	4–5
Engineering	▲59	3
Life sciences	▲101–125	4
Physical sciences	▲101–125	3
Social sciences	251–300	3–4

ARWU Global Ranking of Academic Subjects 2023
Subject	Global	National
Natural Sciences
Mathematics	▲201–300	▲3–5
Physics	151–200	4–5
Chemistry	▼151–200	▼7–8
Earth Sciences	101–150	2–4
Ecology	401–500	4–5
Atmospheric Science	301–400	7–9
Engineering
Mechanical Engineering	76–100	1
Electrical & Electronic Engineering	▼301–400	▼4–8
Telecommunication Engineering	▲51–75	1–2
Computer Science & Engineering	▲201–300	▼3–4
Civil Engineering	▼201–300	▲2–6
Chemical Engineering	201–300	2–5
Materials Science & Engineering	▼151–200	3–5
Nanoscience & Nanotechnology	201–300	▲2–4
Energy Science & Engineering	▼151–200	2–5
Environmental Science & Engineering	401–500	▼6
Biotechnology	▲151–200	▲1–2
Metallurgical Engineering	▼25	1
Life Sciences
Biological Sciences	301–400	6–10
Human Biological Sciences	401–500	▲9–11
Veterinary Sciences	201–300	1–6
Medical Sciences
Dentistry & Oral Sciences	▲76–100	▲5
Medical Technology	▼301–400	1–6
Social Sciences

Program rankings
Engineering
QS World	General	56

MATERIALS SCIENCE
T.Reuters National	Research	1
T.Reuters World	Research	3

PHYSICS
T.Reuters National	Research	2
T.Reuters World	Research	10

CHEMISTRY
T.Reuters National	Research	4
T.Reuters World	Research	20

BIOLOGY & BIOCHEMISTRY
T.Reuters National	Research	7
T.Reuters World	Research	113

Life Sciences

IMMUNOLOGY
T.Reuters National	Research	6
T.Reuters World	Research	142

PHARMACOLOGY & TOXICOLOGY
T.Reuters National	Research	3
T.Reuters World	Research	64
- * T. Reuters World rankings include non-educational institutions

=== Research performance ===
Tohoku University is one of the top research institutions in Japan. According to Thomson Reuters, Tohoku University is the ninth most innovative university in the Asia-Pacific area. Its research excellence is especially distinctive in Materials Science (1st in Japan, third in the world), Physics (2nd in Japan, tenth in the world), Pharmacology & Toxicology (3rd in Japan, 64th in the world) and Chemistry (6th in Japan, 20th in the world).

Times Higher Education also reported that Tohoku University was ranked 3rd in Japan (201st - 250th in the world) for the World University Rankings 2022 by Subject: social sciences. The social sciences ranking includes the weightings such as Research: volume, income and reputation (accounts for 32.6 per cent) and Citations: research influence (accounts for 25 per cent).

In addition, Nature Index ranked Tohoku University as 4th in Japan (90th in the world, 38th in Asia Pacific) on 2023 tables: Institutions. The 2022 tables are based on Nature Index data from 1 January 2021 to 31 December 2021. Before the 2022 edition, Nature Index also ranked Tohoku University as 5th in Japan (77th in the world, 28th in Asia Pacific) on 2021 tables: Institutions, that are based on Nature Index data from 1 January 2020 to 31 December 2020.

According to the Qs World university rankings on 2012/9 surveyed about the general standards in Engineering&Technology field, Tohoku university was placed 56th (world), fifth (national).

As Tohoku University has been emphasizing 'practical' research, Tohoku received the top place for its number of patents accepted (324) during 2009 among Japanese Universities.

=== Graduate school rankings ===
Tohoku University Law School is one of the most famous Law schools in Japan, as it was ranked fifth in the passing rate of Japanese Bar Examination in 2020.

=== Alumni rankings ===
Mines ParisTech : Professional Ranking World Universities ranks Tohoku University as 13th in the world (5th in Japan) in 2011 in terms of the number of alumni listed among CEOs in the 500 largest worldwide companies.

=== Popularity and selectivity ===
Tohoku University is regarded as a selective university, with its faculty of medicine being particularly noted for its selectivity. It is usually ranked amongst the most selective STEM degrees in the country, alongside the medicine, engineering and science degrees at the University of Tokyo and the faculties of medicine of TMDU, Kyoto, Osaka, Nagoya, and Keio.

=== Evaluation from business world ===
The university ranking according to the order of the evaluation by Personnel Departments of Leading Companies in Japan
	Ranking
Japan	3rd (out of 788 universities in Japan as of 2021)
Source	2021 Nikkei Survey to all listed (3,714) and leading unlisted (1,100), totally 4,850 companies

== Presidents ==
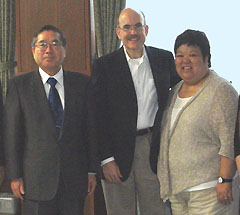
Akihisa Inoue (left) talked with James P. Zumwalt (chargé d'affaires) and Ann Kambara at Tohoku University in 2009.

1. Masataro Sawayanagi
2. kiyuki Ho (北条 時敬)
3. Ryojiro Hukuhara (福原 鐐二郎)
4. Masataka Ogawa
5. Nikichi Inoue (井上 仁吉)
6. Kotaro Honda
7. Taizo Kumagai (熊谷 岱蔵)
8. Yasutaro Satake (佐武 安太郎)
9. Satomi Takahashi (高橋 里美)
10. Toshio Kurokawa (黒川 利雄)
11. Teruji Ishizu (石津 照璽)
12. Koichi Motokawa (本川 弘一)
13. Mutsuo Kato (加藤 陸奥雄)
14. Shiro Maeda (前田 四郎)
15. Nakao Ishida (石田 名香雄)
16. Shigemori Ohtani (大谷 茂盛)
17. Jun-ichi Nishizawa
18. Hiroyuki Abe (阿部 博之)
19. Takashi Yoshimoto (吉本 高志)
20. Akihisa Inoue (井上 明久)
21. Susumu Satomi
22. Hideo Ohno
23. Teiji Tominaga (冨永 悌二)

== Notable people ==
=== Sciences ===
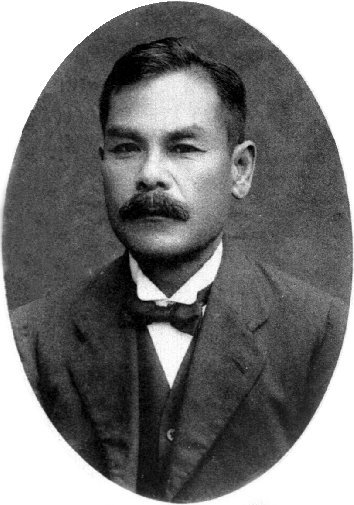
Masataka Ogawa, chemist, former president, known for the discovery of rhenium

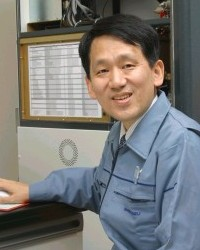
Koichi Tanaka, chemist, 2002 Nobel Prize in Chemistry winner

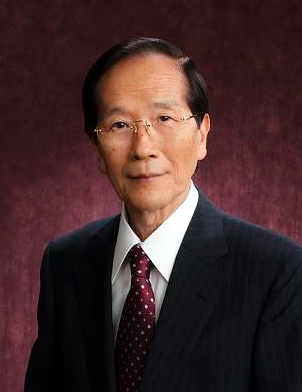
Akira Endo, biochemist, known for the discovery of first statin, 2008 Lasker Award and 2017 Gairdner Award winner

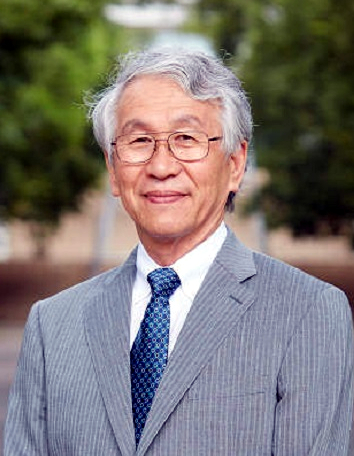
Atsuto Suzuki, physicist, 2016 Breakthrough Prize in Fundamental Physics winner

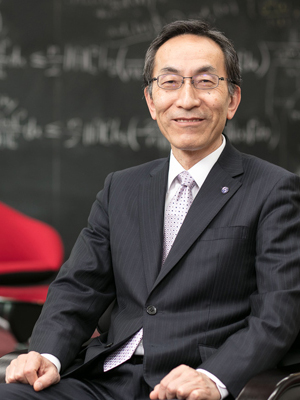
Hideo Ohno, physicist, the 22nd president of Tohoku University
- Hitoshi Oshitani, scientist, virologist and public health expert
- Tetsuo Nozoe, chemist, known for hinokitiol
- Tsutomu Ōhashi, artist and scientist, Doctor of Agriculture
- Syun-Ichi Akasofu, geophysicist, the founding director of the International Arctic Research Center of UAF
- Hiroshi Maeda, pharmacologist and chemist, known for discovery of EPR effect
- Chen Wei-jao, a surgeon and president of National Taiwan University
- Lo Tung-bin, biochemist, pioneer in the research on proteins in Taiwan
- Susumu Satomi, a surgeon and president of Tohoku University
- Ryuta Kawashima, neuroscientist, currently resident professor, the supervisor of Nintendo DS gamesofts; Brain Age: Train Your Brain in Minutes a Day! and Dr. Kawashima's Brain Training: How Old is Your Brain?
- Noriko Osumi, neuroscientist, the vice president of Tohoku University (2018–)
- Mahmoud Nili Ahmadabadi, president of University of Tehran

=== Engineering ===
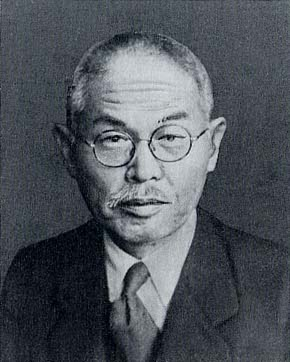
Kotaro Honda, inventor, former president, 1932 Nobel Prize in Physics nominee

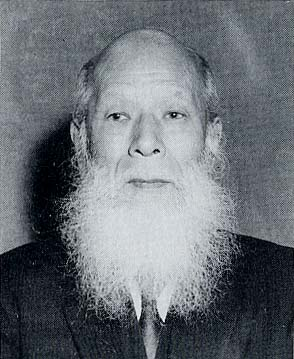
Hidetsugu Yagi, engineer, mentor of Yagi–Uda antenna

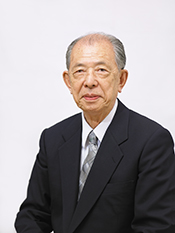
Shun-ichi Iwasaki, engineer, pioneer of perpendicular recording and modern hard disk drives

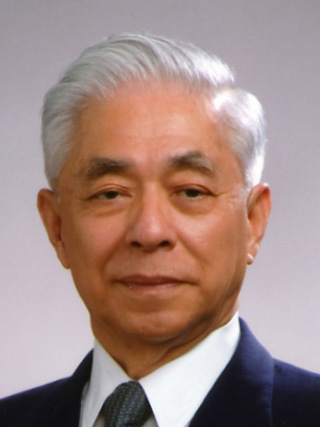
Jun-ichi Nishizawa, engineer, known for inventing optical communication systems including optical fiber, laser diode and so forth, PIN diode and SIT/SITh

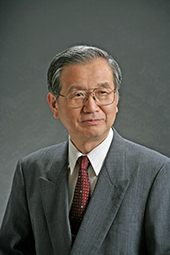
Fujio Masuoka, engineer, the developer of flash memory

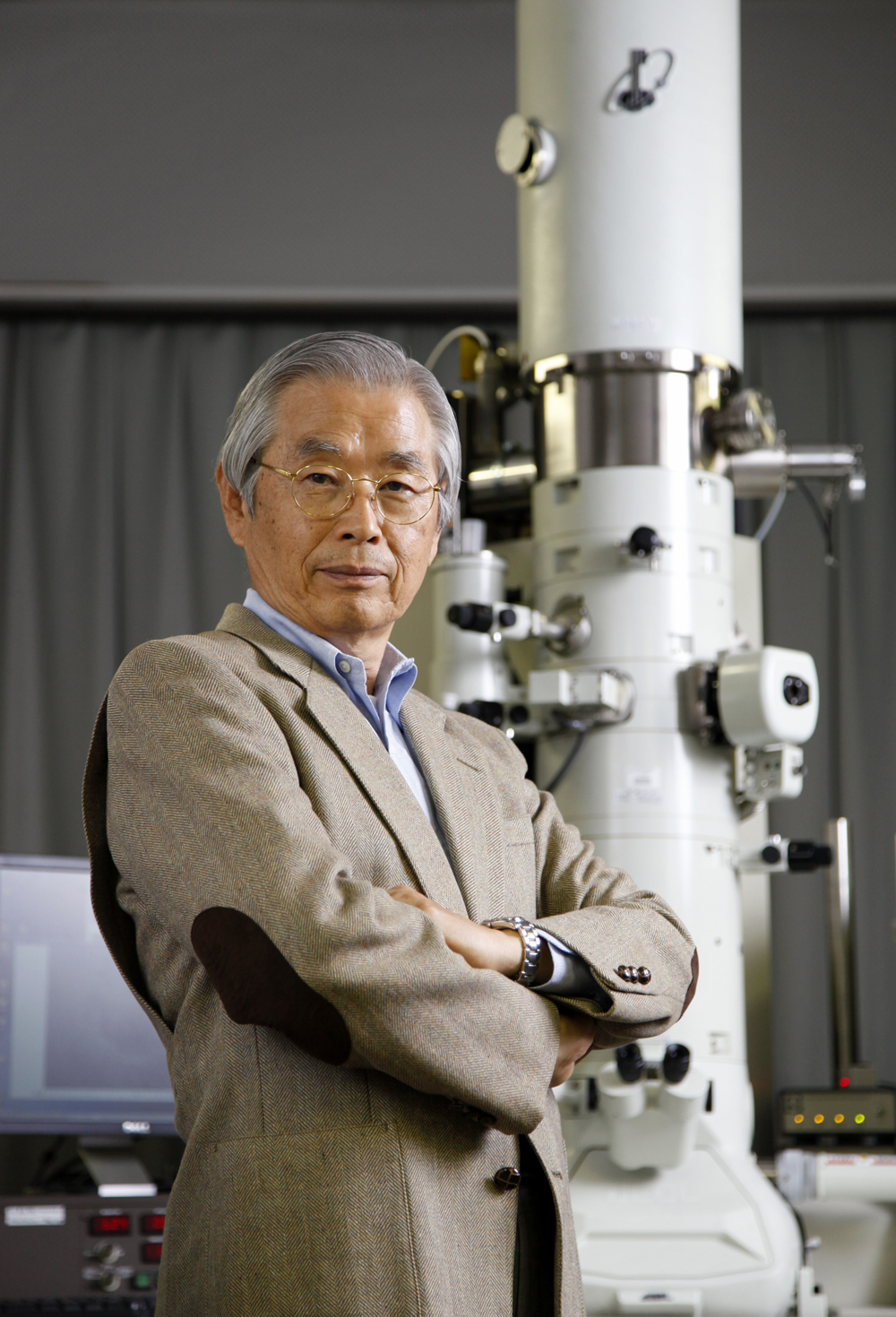
Sumio Iijima, physicist, inventor of carbon nanotubes

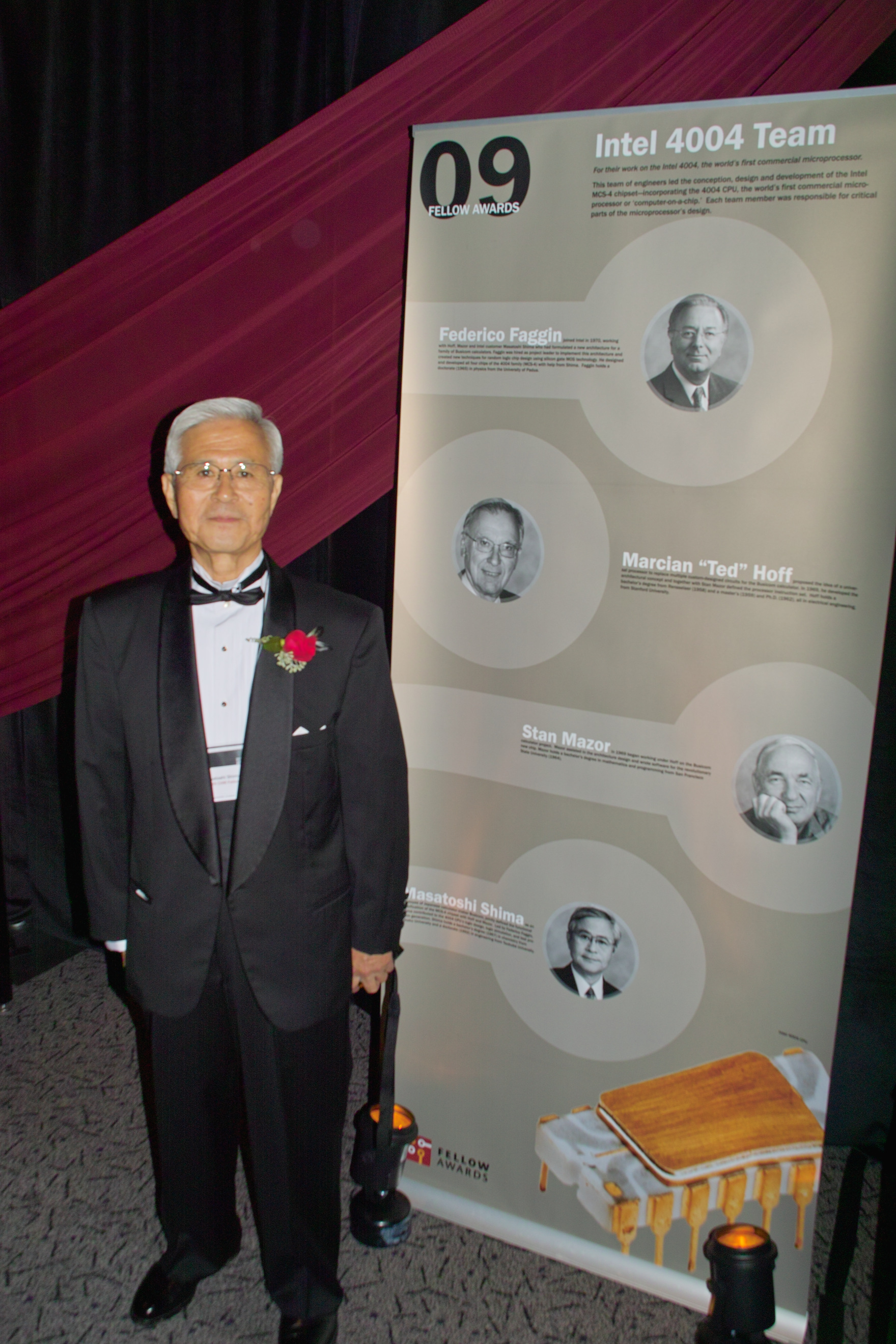
Masatoshi Shima, inventor of CPU Intel 4004

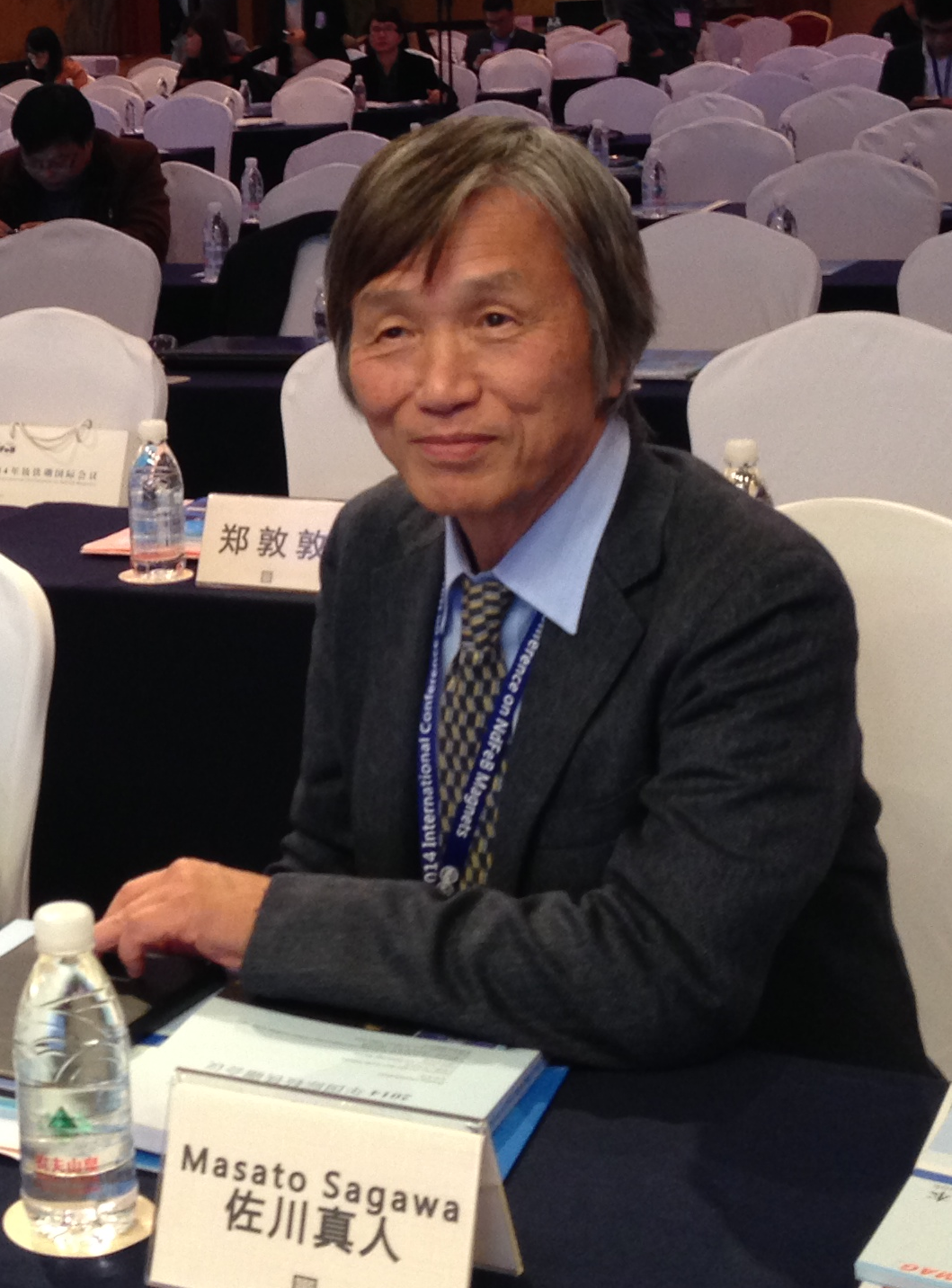
Masato Sagawa, inventor of sintered NdFeB magnets, the winner of 2022 Queen Elizabeth Prize for Engineering
- Shintaro Uda, an inventor of the Yagi-Uda antenna 1926, the ubiquitous television antenna
- Masayoshi Esashi, engineer, the global authority of Microelectromechanical systems
- Toshitada Doi, a pioneer in digital audio, originated Aibo the pet robot
- Fumihiko Imamura, civil engineer, the natural disaster expert for NHK after 2011 Tōhoku earthquake and tsunami
- Masataka Nakazawa, pioneer of optical solitons in high-speed optical communication in fiber optic networks and rare earth-doped optical amplifiers (such as EDFA)

=== Literature and arts ===
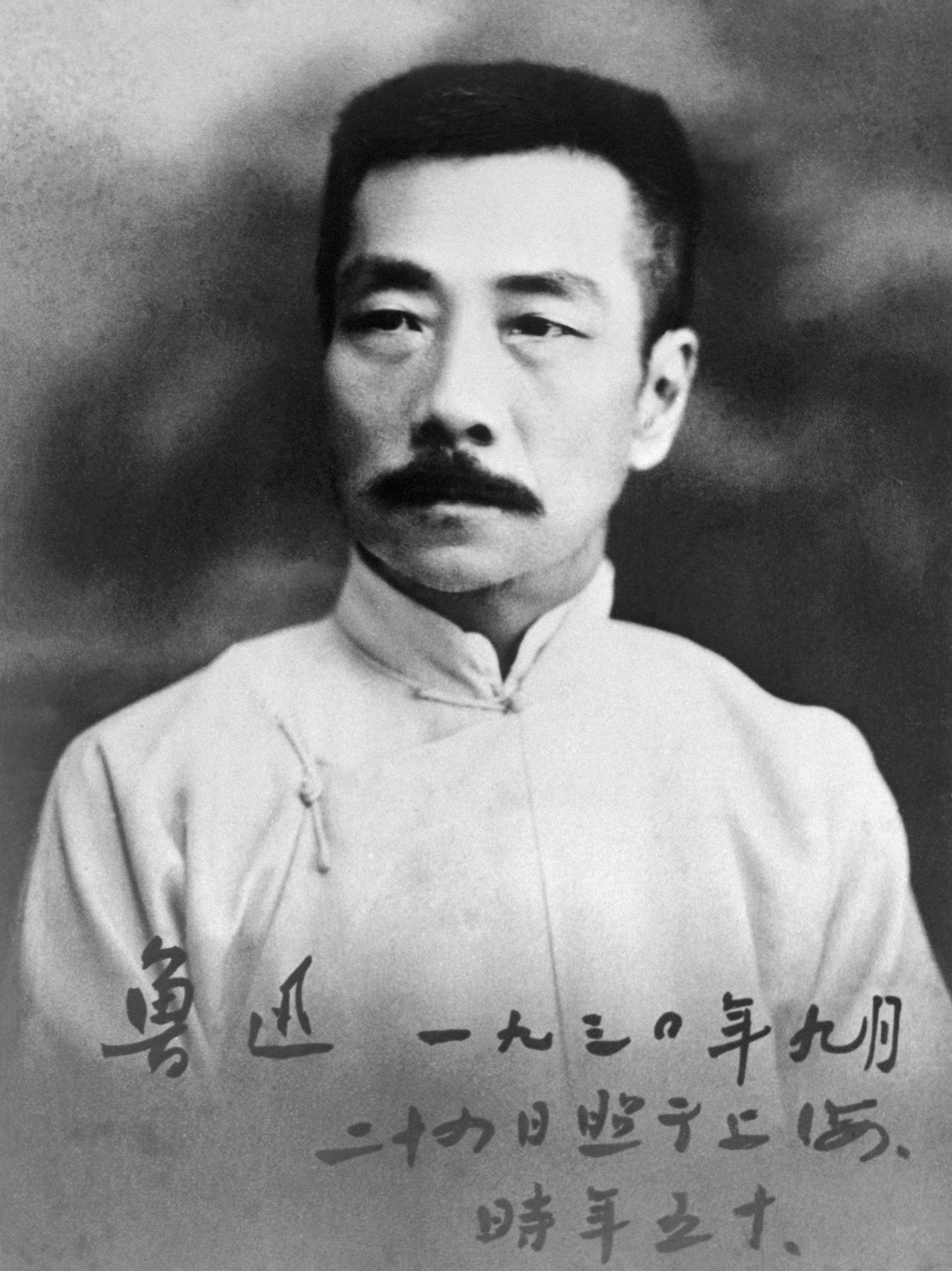
Lu Xun, the greatest writer in modern China

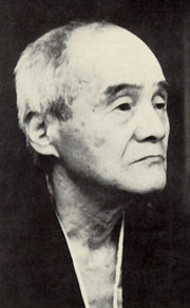
Hajime Tanabe, philosopher of science, member of Kyoto School

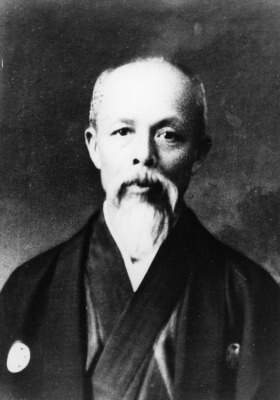
Ido Reizan, a journalist, writer, poet, and involved in Freedom and People's Rights Movement

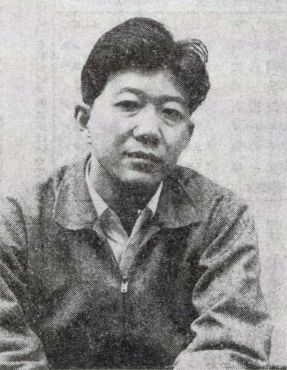
Morio Kita, novelist, 1960 Akutagawa Prize winner

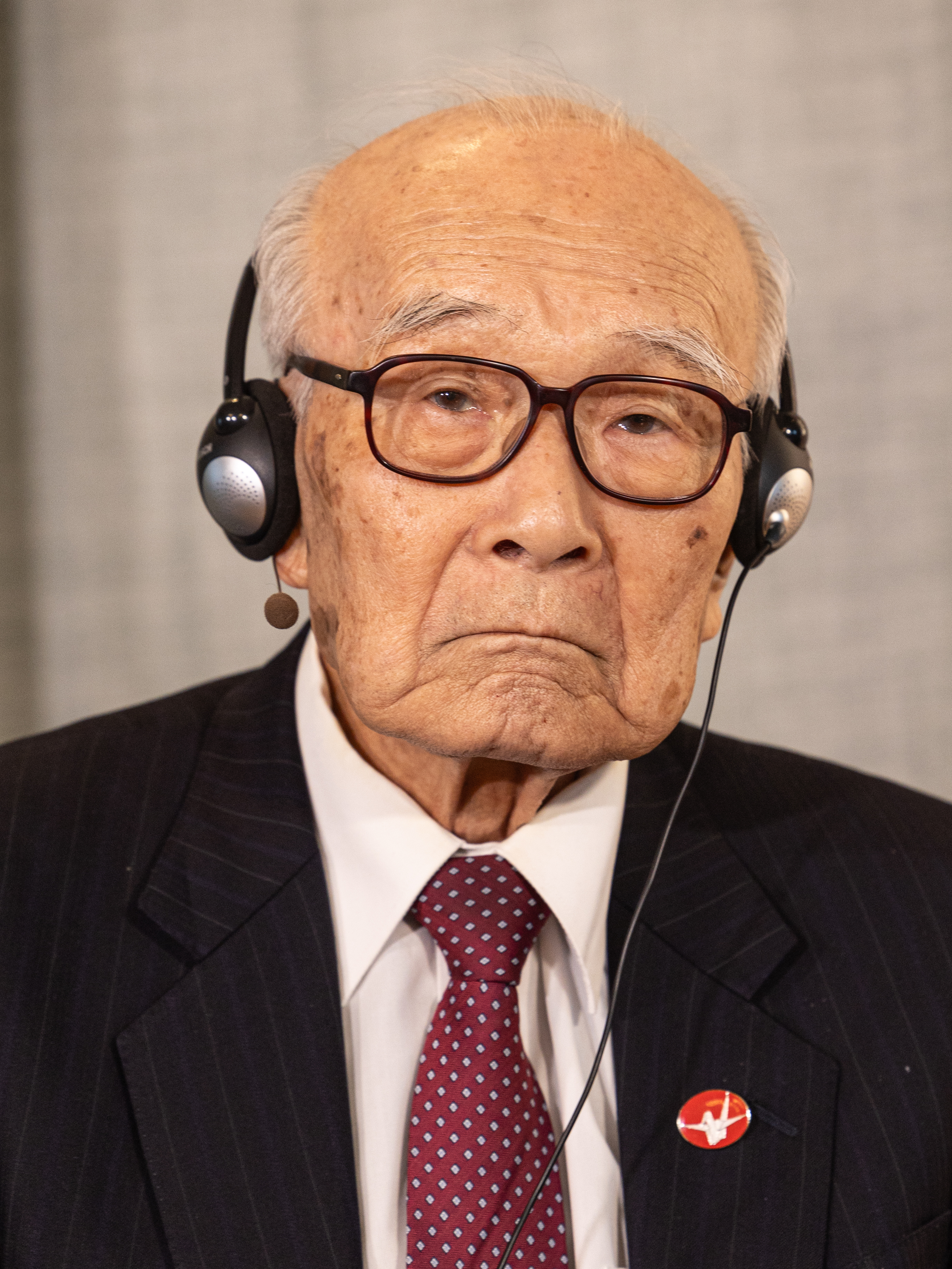
Terumi Tanaka former professor, Representative of Nihon Hidankyo, 2024 Nobel Peace Prize Ceremony in Oslo, Norway
- Ben Goto, a Japanese writer
- Hayao Hamada, a Taiwanese author
- Tadao Ooike, novelist, 1938 Naoki Prize winner
- Yō Tsumoto, novelist, 1978 Naoki Prize winner
- Akihiko Nakamura, novelist, 1994 Naoki Prize winner
- Kenichi Satō, novelist, 1999 Naoki Prize winner
- Toh EnJoe, author, 2012 Akutagawa Prize, Nihon SF Taisho Award, and 2013 Seiun Award winner
- Yuichi Kodama, a Japanese video director
- Kazumasa Oda, one of the most famous musicians in pop music in Japan since the 1970s
- Kōtarō Isaka, a mystery fiction writer, Japan Booksellers Award and Yamamoto Shūgorō Prize winner
- Hideaki Sena, a science fiction writer and Nihon SF Taisho Award winner
- Chūsei Sone, a Japanese film director and screenwriter
- Kenji Suzuki, an announcer of the NHK
- Chinggeltei (1924–2013), a Mongolist, the former vice-rector of Inner Mongolia University

=== Mathematics, economics and business ===
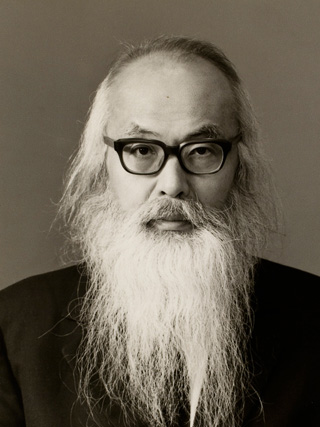
Hirofumi Uzawa, an economist, the father of Theoretical Economics in Japan

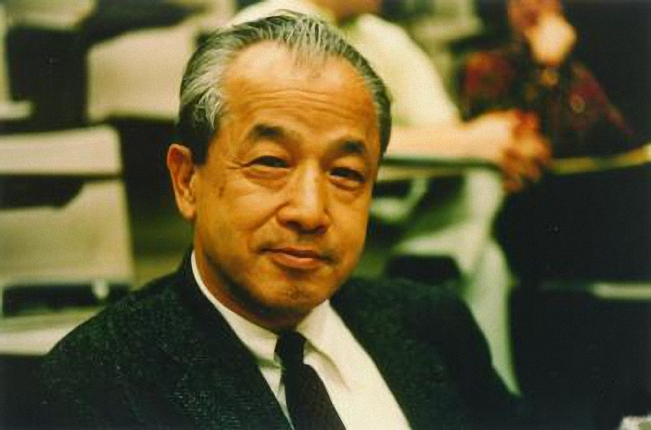
Shizuo Kakutani, mathematician, professor at Yale, known for Kakutani fixed-point theorem

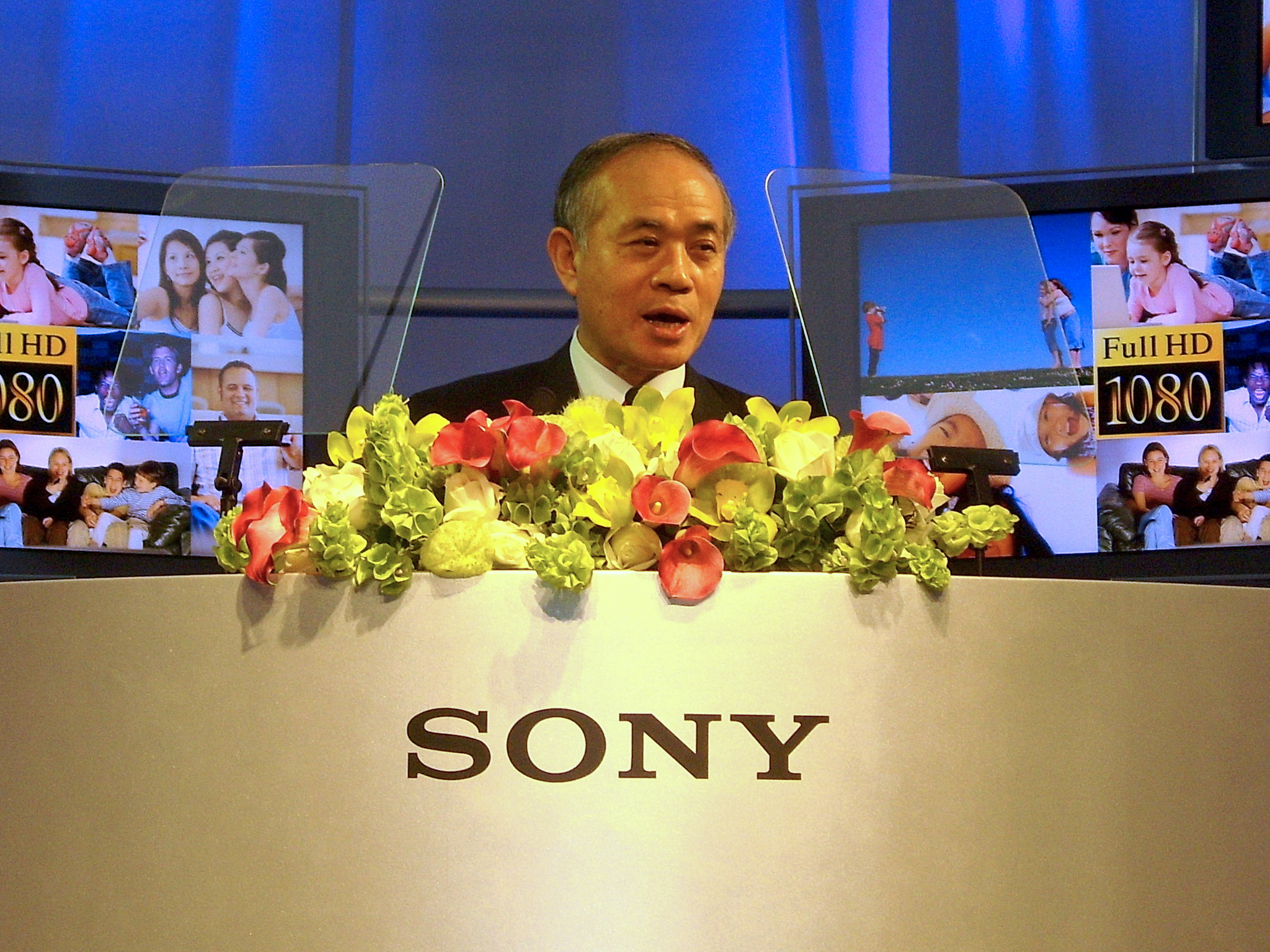
Ryōji Chūbachi, a Japanese businessman, former vice chairman and president of Sony Corporation
- Nobuhiko Kawamoto, CEO of Honda Motor until 1995
- Su Buqing, a Chinese mathematician and former president of Fudan University
- Chen Jiangong, pioneer of modern Chinese mathematics
- Yasumasa Kanada, a mathematician most known for his numerous world records over the past two decades for calculating digits of π
- Shigeo Sasaki, a professor emeritus and mathematician who introduced the Sasaki manifold

=== Politics ===
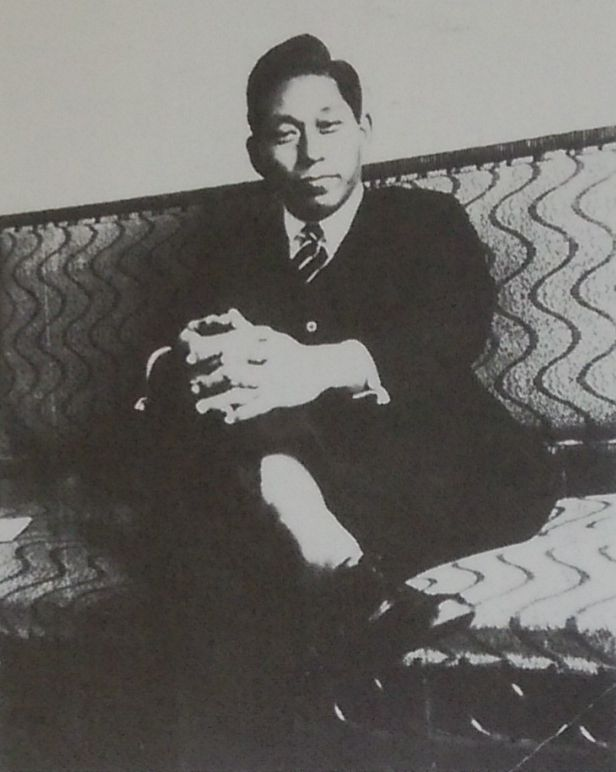
Shigeyoshi Matsumae, a Japanese politician, electrical engineer, and founder of Tokai University

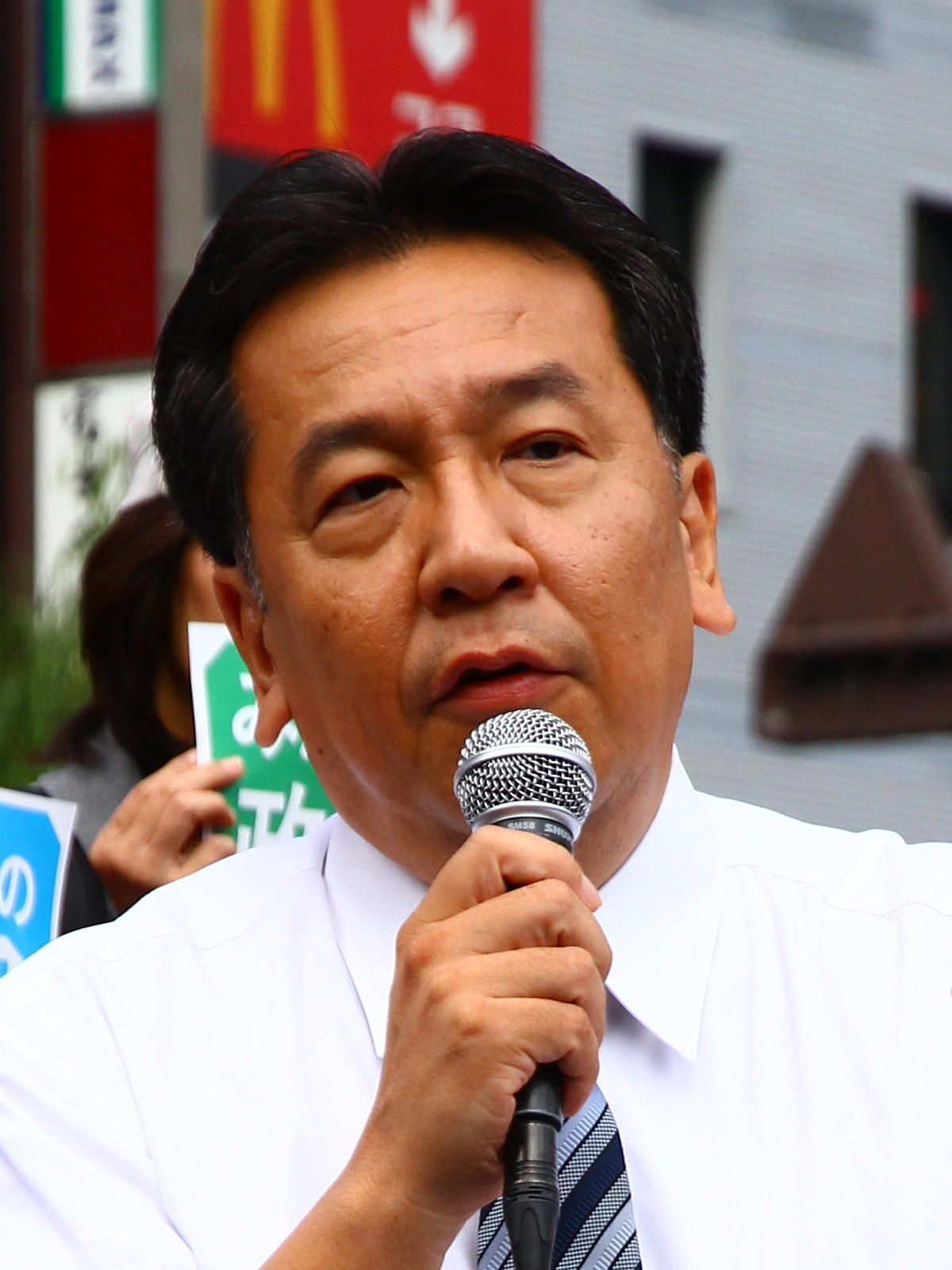
Yukio Edano, a Japanese politician and a member of the House of Representatives in the Diet

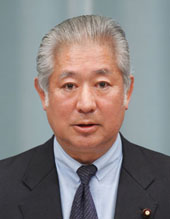
Eisuke Mori, a Japanese politician of the Liberal Democratic Party

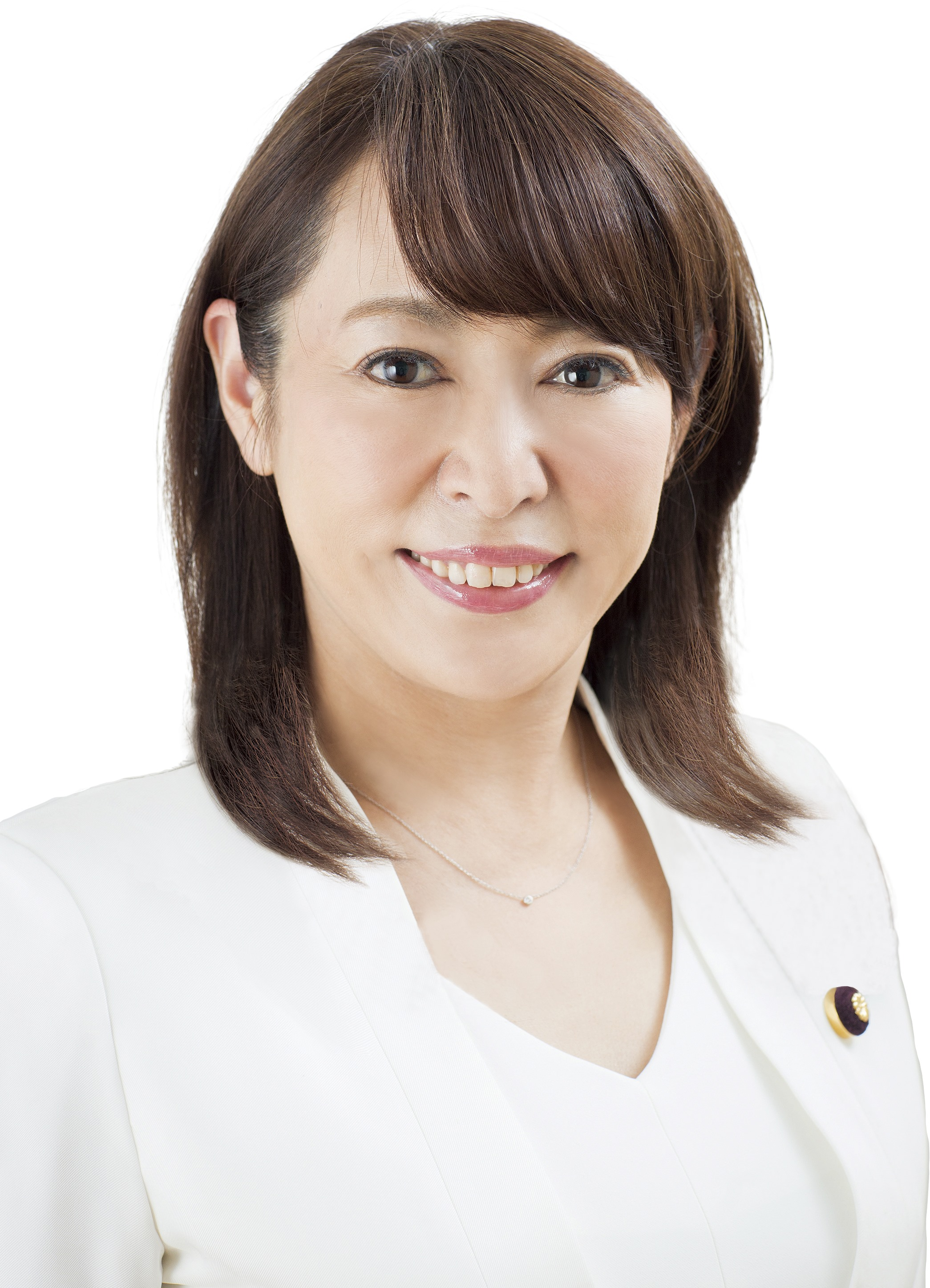
Masako Mori, a Japanese politician of the Liberal Democratic Party
- Kenya Akiba, a Japanese politician of the Liberal Democratic Party
- Masayuki Aoyama, Japanese politician in the House of Representatives
- Yoshihisa Inoue, Japanese politician of the New Komeito Party
- Akira Koike, a Japanese politician of Japanese Communist Party
- Sōichirō Miyashita, governor of Aomori Prefecture
- Mitsuru Sakurai, Japanese politician of the Democratic Party of Japan
- Nori Sasaki, Japanese politician of the Democratic Party of Japan
- Emiko Okuyama, Mayor of Sendai, 2009–2017

== See also ==
- Tohoku Mathematical Journal
- Institute for Materials Research
- Sendai
- List of National Treasures of Japan (writings)
- Tegula kusairo
