= Gaisser =

Gaisser is a surname. Notable people with the surname include:

- Julia Haig Gaisser (born 1941), American classical philologist
- Serge Gaisser (born 1958), French footballer
- Thomas K. Gaisser (1940–2022), American physicist

== See also ==
- Gaisser–Hillas function, named for Thomas
- Gaisser Valley, named for Thomas
