= Ramanath Cowsik =

Indian astrophysicist

- Born: 1940 (age 85–86); Nagpur, India
- Occupation: Astrophysicist
- Years active: Since 1961
- Employer: Washington University in St. Louis
- Known for: Astroparticle physics
- Spouse: Sudha
- Children: Siddhartha; Aditya
- Scientific career
- Doctoral students: Subir Sarkar
- Website: Profile

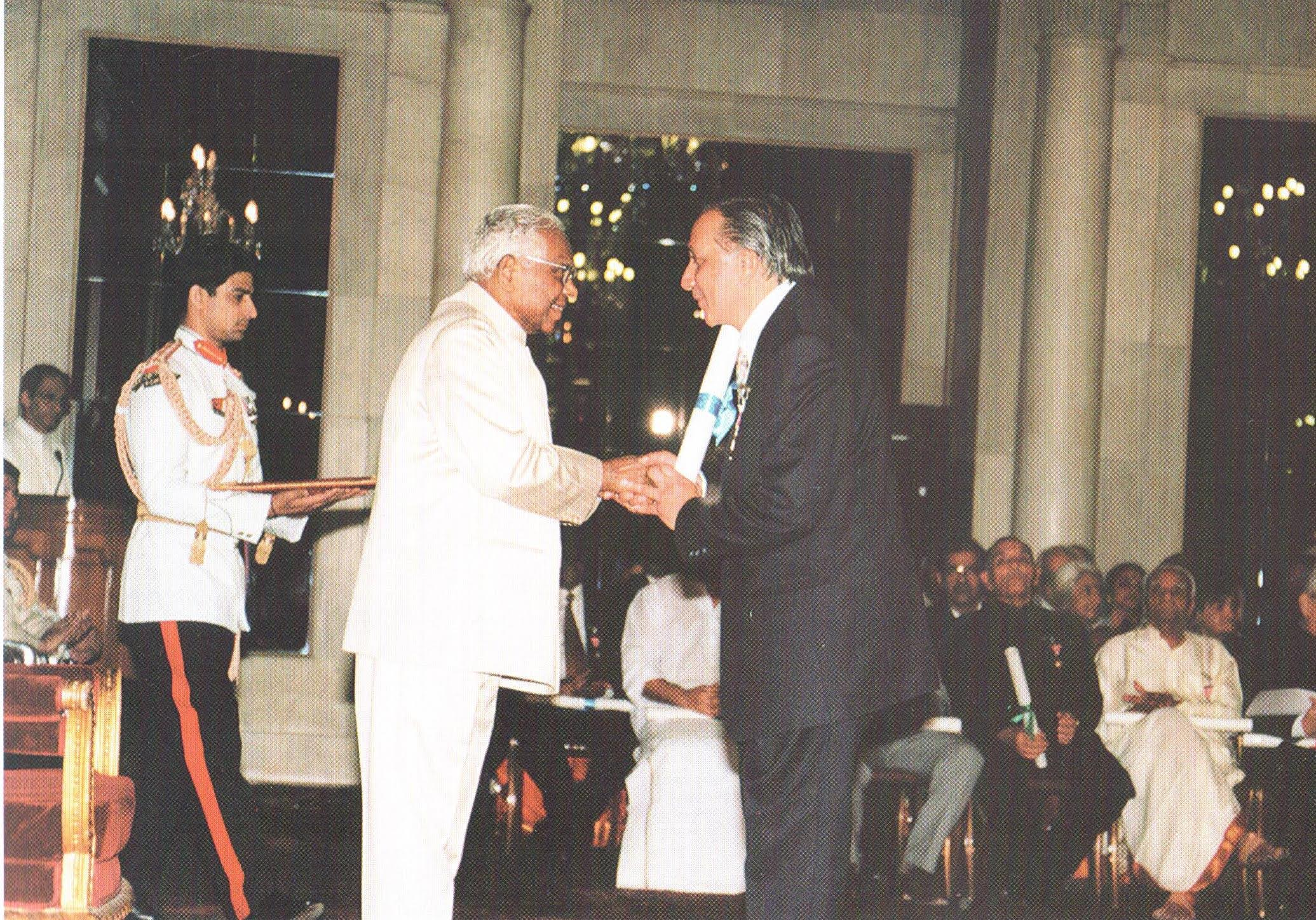
Prof Cowsik receiving the Padma Shri Award from the President of India.

Ramanath Cowsik is an Indian astrophysicist and the James S. McDonnell Professor of Space Sciences at Washington University in St. Louis. He is considered by many as the father of astroparticle physics. A recipient of the Shanti Swarup Bhatnagar Prize, Cowsik was honored by the Government of India, in 2002, with the fourth highest Indian civilian award of Padma Shri

== Biography ==
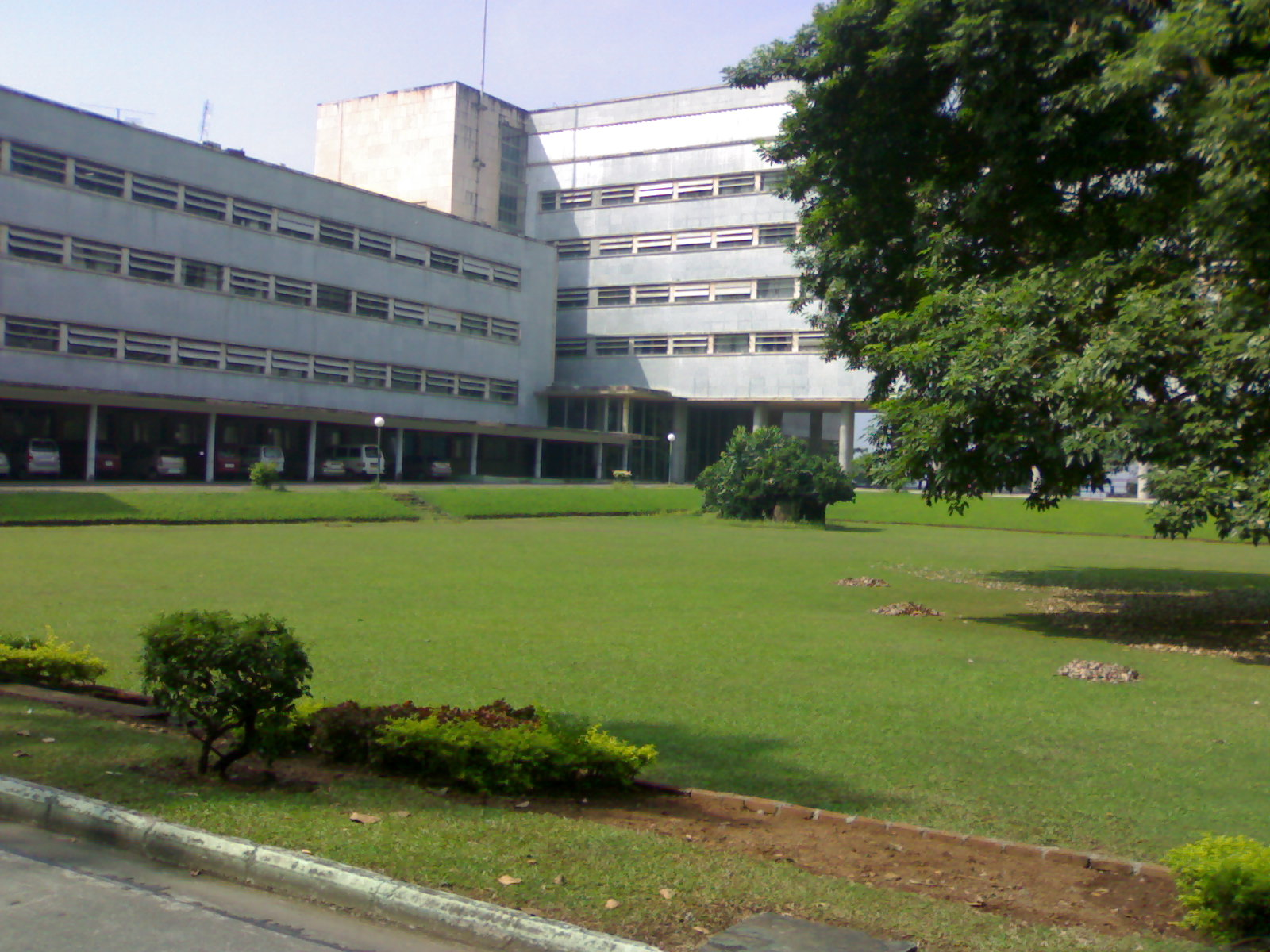
TIFR main campus

Ramanath Cowsik was born in 1940 in Nagpur, in the Western Indian state of Maharashtra. He did his schooling in Karnataka which he completed before turning 14 and graduated from Mysore University in 1958, with physics, chemistry and biology as the optional subjects, at the age of 17. He continued his master's studies at the Karnatak university in Dharwar, to secure the degree in physics in 1960, aged 19 and joined the Atomic Energy Establishment Training School, present day Homi Bhabha National Institute, Trombay where he did a post graduate course. He started his career as a member of faculty of the Tata Institute of Fundamental Research (TIFR) in 1961, simultaneously pursuing his doctoral studies to secure a PhD from Bombay University in 1968, researching under the guidance of Professor Yash Pal. He taught at TIFR for over forty years, growing over the years as a fellow, a reader, an associate professor, a professor, a senior professor, and reaching the status of a distinguished professor of the institute. He also worked as the Director of the Indian Institute of Astrophysics on deputation from TIFR, during the period from 1992 to 2003, where he has been a Vainu Bappu Distinguished Professor. On invitation from P. Buford Price, Cowsik also worked as an assistant professor at the University of California, Berkeley from 1970 to 1973.

In December 2002, he moved to Washington University in St. Louis and serves at the McDonnell Centre for the Space Sciences as the Professor of Physics and Director. He is the James S. McDonnell Professor of Space Sciences of the institute since 2013. A former research fellow of the University of Chicago, Cowsik is a visiting professor at the University of California and a visiting fellow at the Max Planck Institute for Physics and Astrophysics, Munich. He has also served as a member of the governing council of the Commission on Cosmic Rays of the International Union of Pure and Applied Physics. He is a member of the International Society for Science and Religion and sits in the board of advisors of Forgiveness Research, a community of forgiveness.

Cowsik, who is known to be proficient in languages such as Tamil, Hindi, Kannada, Sanskrit, English, German and French, is married to Sudha, a research instructor and a doctoral degree (PhD) holder, associated with the Department of Biochemistry and Molecular Biophysics of the Washington University in St. Louis. Cowsik has two sons, Sasha and Aditya, and resides in the city of St. Louis.

== Legacy ==
Ram Cowsik has the attributes I most admire in a scientist. Throughout his entire career, he has thought broadly and creatively about unsolved puzzles at the forefront of physics, says P. Buford Price, renowned physicist.

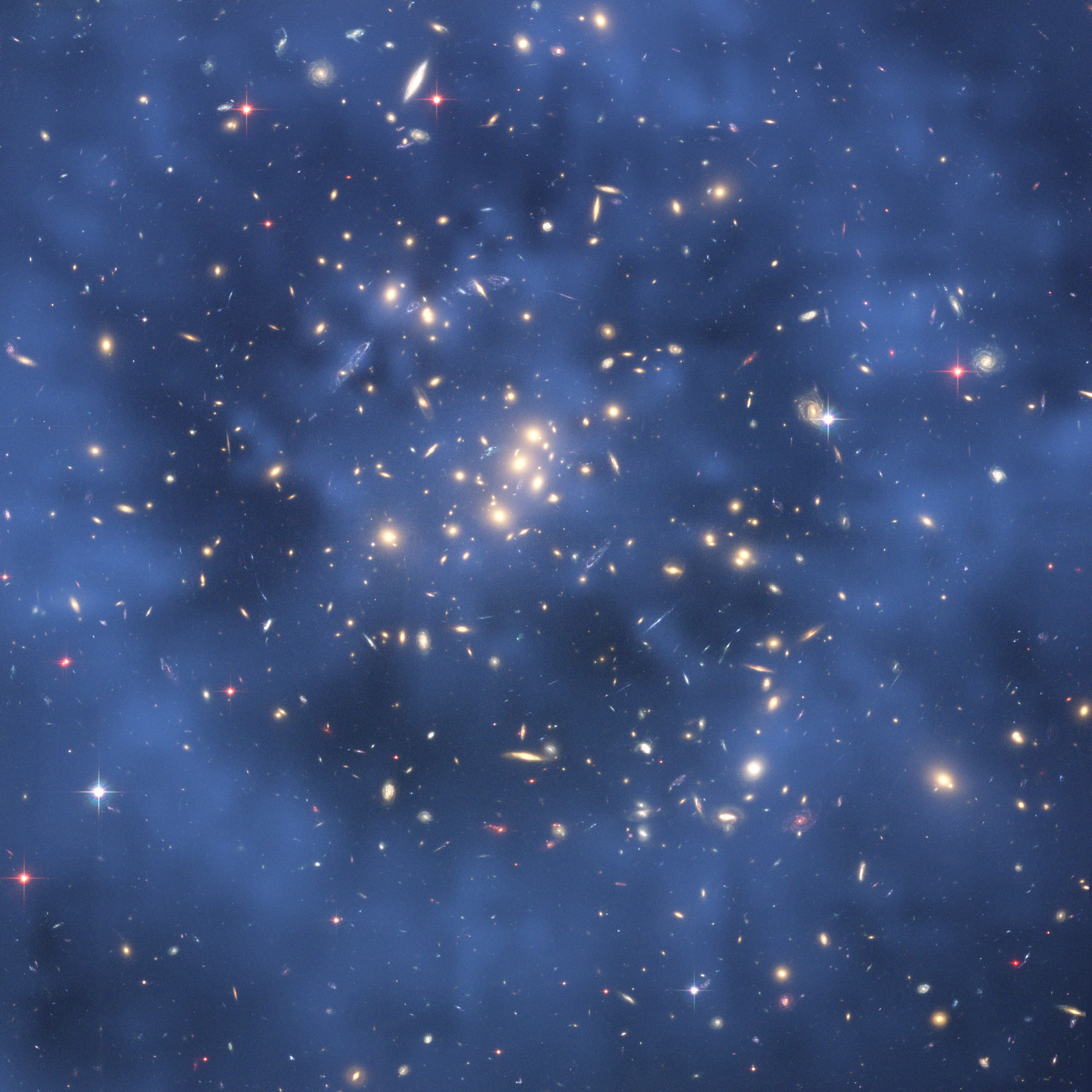
Dark matter is invisible. Based on the effect of gravitational lensing, a ring of dark matter has been detected in this image of a galaxy cluster (CL0024+17) and is represented in blue.

Ramanath Cowsik is known for his theories related to the Big Bang origin of the universe. He argued that, post the Big Bang, gravitationally dominant relicts were formed from the particles with finite rest mass, resulting in the formation of halos of dark matter with galaxies embedded within. He postulated that this would limit the sums of masses of neutrinos, a phenomenon known in the scientific world as the Cowsik-McClelland bound. These theories are said to have explained the velocity dispersion of particles of dark matter and reproduced the luminosity profiles and ratified the rotation curves of galaxies.

Cowsik is credited with the invention of leaky box and nested leaky box models for the observation of optical and infrared wavelength bands of cosmic rays and employing these models, he is known to have established an observatory for optical astronomy in Hanle, Ladakh, at an altitude of 15,000 feet, reported to be the highest observatory in the world. The observatory is controlled remotely from Bangalore and is operational year round. He is involved in experiments related to Grand Unified Theory and attempts to probe violations of the inverse square law of gravity at sub-millimeter scales. His scientific paper on the role of neutrinos was included by the American Physical Society and the Physics Review magazine, in their selection of 1000 most important scientific papers of the century.

Cowsik has reported contributions towards understanding highly energetic phenomena in astrophysics such as cosmic ray, pulsar, supernova remnant, gamma ray burst, active galactic nucleus and other similar sources powered by accretion flows. His studies cover the diffuse non thermal radiations found all over space as well as radiations from discrete astronomical sources. His experiments are known to be interdisciplinary in nature and bridge the gap between universal phenomena and experimental physics. He has conducted extensive research on pre-solar grains of aluminum oxide found in meteorites and has devised a methodology to assess the age of the universe from them.

Ramanath Cowsik is credited with the first detailed calculations on neutrino fluxes generated atmospheric cosmic ray interactions and observations of the same in underground detectors. These findings have been known to have assisted in the discovery of neutrino oscillations at Super-Kamiokande observatory in Japan. He is also known to have made the longest half-life measured in the world which related to that of double beta decay of Te-128, as 7.7 x 1024 years. He has also conducted studies on finite temperature corrections to the Casimir forces occur at large separations. Cowsik has developed a sensitive torsion balance using which he conducted the first laboratory experiment for the so-called fifth force. He is involved in the development of a more sensitive torsion balance for probing the violations of the Inverse-square law of gravity at millimeter scales,

Cowsik, who has drawn comparison with the renowned physicist, Enrico Fermi for his achievements in theoretical and experimental physics, has published his experiments and observations in several scientific papers published in peer reviewed journals and ResearchGate, an online repository has listed 193 of them. He has attended several seminars and conferences and has delivered keynote addresses on astrophysics and the relationship between religion and science. He has edited three books, including "Cosmic Pathways", a collection of essays in physics and astrophysics. He has also assisted other scientists in ratifying their experiments by acting as a reference point; his involvement in the OPERA experiment, a CERN, Geneva and the Laboratori Nazionali del Gran Sasso, Gran Sasso collaboration was one such instance.

== Awards and recognitions ==
Ramanath Cowsik is an elected Fellow of the Indian National Science Academy, Indian Academy of Sciences, National Academy of Sciences, India, Indian Geophysical Union and The Academy of Sciences for the Developing World. He is a Foreign Associate of the National Academy of Sciences, USA, a life member of the American Physical Society and a member of the International Astronomical Union.

Cowsik received the Shri Hari Om Prerit Vikram Sarabhai Award in 1981, followed by Shanti Swarup Bhatnagar Prize in 1984. NASA awarded him the Public Service Group Achievement Award in 1986 and the Indian National Science Academy awarded him the Vainu Bappu Memorial Medal in 1997. The Government of India honoured him with the civilian award of Padma Shri in 2002 and he received the M. P. Birla Award in 2007. In 2009 he was awarded the Ó Ceallaigh Medal by the IUPAP Cosmic Ray Commission. He is also a recipient of TWAS Prize and the ISCA S. N. Bose Birth Centenary Award and has delivered the Sir C. V. Raman Memorial Award Lecture (1996) and the Jawaharlal Nehru Birth Centenary Award Lecture (2002).

== See also ==
- Astroparticle physics
- Neutrino
- Washington University in St. Louis
- Indian Institute of Astrophysics
- Dark matter
- Grand Unified Theory
- Fifth Force
- Optical astronomy
