= Reuven Ramaty =

Romanian-American astronomer (1937–2001)

- Born: February 25, 1937
- Died: April 8, 2001 (aged 64); Silver Spring, Maryland
- Education: Tel Aviv University (BSc); University of California, Los Angeles (PhD)
- Employer(s): Goddard Space Flight Center; University of Maryland, College Park; California Institute of Technology; Stanford University; University of California, Berkeley; University of California, San Diego; University of Pennsylvania; Washington University in St. Louis
- Known for: high-energy astrophysics
- Awards: Alexander von Humboldt Foundation the Senior U.S. Scientist Award 1975; NASA Exceptional Scientific Achievement Award 1980; Lindsay Award, Goddard Space Flight Center 1981; Yodh lifetime Prize 2001

Reuven Ramaty (1937–2001) was a Hungarian-born Israeli-American astrophysicist who worked for 30 years at NASA's Goddard Space Flight Center. He was a leader in the fields of solar physics, gamma-ray line spectrometry, nuclear astrophysics, and low-energy cosmic rays. Ramaty was a founding member of NASA's High Energy Solar Spectroscopic Imager which later was renamed in his honor to Reuven Ramaty High Energy Solar Spectroscopic Imager. This was the first space mission to be named after a NASA scientist and was operational from 2002 until 2018. Ramaty made many contributions in the field of astrophysics and solar physics. He was given the Goddard Lindsay Award in 1980.

== Early life ==
Ramaty was born on February 25, 1937, to two Hungarian parents Michael Miki Reiter and Eliz Ramaty, living in Timișoara, Romania. In 1948, when he was 11 years old, he moved with his family to Israel to escape growing cultural tensions and economic difficulties following the Second World War. He became the stepson of Gizi Reiter after her marriage to his father. Ramaty remained in Israel for 16 years, where he finished his secondary education and graduated from Tel Aviv University in 1961 with a Bachelor of Science in physics. Ramaty taught physics at a secondary level in Israel before his move to Los Angeles. During his life, Ramaty learnt a total of 8 languages (Hebrew, English, French, Romanian, Hungarian, German, Japanese and Italian).

== Education ==
In 1964 Ramaty enrolled into the University of California, Los Angeles where he pursued his PhD on planetary and space physics. Ramaty completed his PhD from UCLA in the record time of two years in 1966. Ramaty then joined the NASA Goddard Space Flight Center in 1967 as a post-doctoral research associate. During his career, Ramaty remained active in tertiary education institutions as he was an adjunct professor of physics at the University of Maryland, College Park from 1983, where he served as a PhD advisor for six students. Other roles in tertiary education include his time on the doctoral dissertation committee at both the University of Paris (1992) as well as the Pierre and Marie Curie University (1997). Ramaty was also a visiting professor at Nagoya University (1993) and a visiting scientist at California Institute of Technology, Stanford University, University of California, Berkeley, University of California, San Diego, University of Pennsylvania and Washington University in St. Louis.

== Notable work ==
Ramaty was a postdoctoral research associate (Laboratory for High-Energy Astrophysics), Astrophysicist (Laboratory for High-Energy Astrophysics), Head of Theory Office (Laboratory for High-Energy Astrophysics), Associate Editor for Physical Review Letters, chairman of the American Physical Society (Astrophysics division), Chairman of the American Physical Society (High-Energy Astronomy Division) and Divisional counselor for astrophysics for the American Physical Society (APS). His most notable work was carried out at the NASA Goddard Space Flight Center, where he worked for over 30 years.

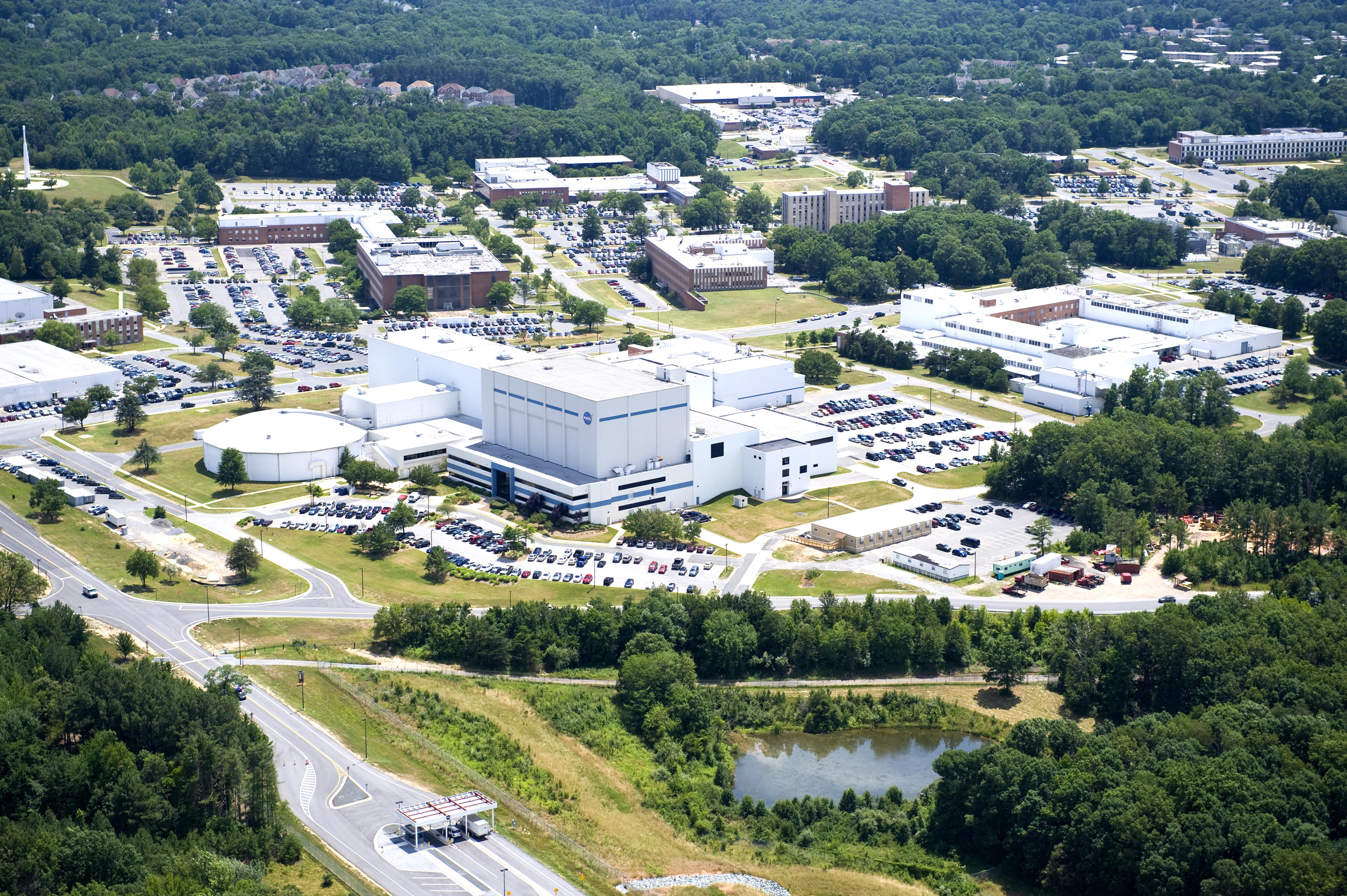
NASA Goddard Space Flight Center Aerial view 2010 facing south.

Ramaty was one of the leading scientists in the field of gamma-ray line astronomy and solar flare physics, cosmic rays and flare-accelerated particles. His work has contributed a wealth of information to the literature in the astrophysical field with over 200 published works under his name and with over 5,000 citations to his works as of 2001, He is credited with studies regarding the observation of high-energy nuclear reactions in solar flares, as well as the use of gamma-ray line observations of flare-accelerated particles to determine their specific properties. The use of gamma-ray line astronomy at the time was new to the field, as it had not been a tool for observing low-energy cosmic rays in interstellar space. With the help of Ramaty's work and his contributions to the field, the observation of Doppler broadening and shape details in nucleosynthesis events are now possible with the RHESSI solar imager and The Compton Observatory. In addition to this, his work on flare-accelerated particles from energetic solar particle events built the foundation for the magnetohydrodynamic simulations which are used to resolve new paradoxes regarding these particles. Having used these simulations. Ramaty's findings have been successfully compared with today's observations. Recent observations within the NASA RHESSI project show his early calculations on low-energy cosmic ray lines and theories on solar flare emissions to be accurate and consistent.

Following the initial discoveries of these observations, Ramaty spent 30 years refining his findings with the Solar Maximum Mission along with the Compton Gamma Ray Observatory. This effort was carried out mainly with the help of Benz Kozlovsky of Tel Aviv University, Ramaty's alma mater. Their discoveries would then lead to Ramaty's theory on the origin of low-energy cosmic rays, now generally accepted within the physics community.

Another notable field of study which Ramaty engaged in was the field of gamma-ray line astronomy, where he published seminal works regarding positron annihilation radiation and studies into nucleosynthetic decay and nuclear de-excitation lines. More of this work, with detailed analysis and presentations of his findings, can be found in the article "Gamma Ray Lines: A New Window to the Universe", co-authored by Ramaty. The study of positron annihilation radiation and nucleosynthetic decay is used in order to understand band structure and Fermi surfaces in metals.

Ramaty's observations of low-energy cosmic rays follow the findings of R. M. Hjellming in order to build upon our understanding of their origins and how they may be observed and imaged with the RHESSI mission and observatories across the world. Ramaty's findings have greatly contributed to the literature in this field of science and current work credits his papers as crucial research. Ramaty's work has been recognized by NASA through his continual efforts and dedication to the field and has honored him with the renaming of the HESSI mission to RHESSI, making it the first NASA mission to be named after a researcher.

== Achievements ==
During his life, Ramaty received a number of significant awards for his work in physics. In 1975 he was awarded the Alexander von Humboldt Foundation the Senior U.S. Scientist Award, the Exceptional Scientific Achievement Award in 1980 from NASA, Lindsay Award from Goddard Space Flight Centre in 1981 and the 2001 Yodh lifetime Prize just a week before his death. These awards were given mainly for his work with Cosmic Rays and the efforts he put into the literature itself as well as the expansion of knowledge in the field. On December 11, 2000, the University of Maryland hosted "A tribute to Reuven Ramaty's Contributions to High- Energy Solar Physics and Astronomy" which celebrated his works in the field of solar physics as well as acknowledging contributions to his work with solar flare emissions throughout his time at the university.

== Notable academic papers and reception ==
The Online Archive of California holds a collection of Ramaty's papers. These works include scientific writings, articles, books, research proposals. Beyond his scientific work at Goddard Space Flight Center, the archive also documents conferences organised by Ramaty. As of 2020, there are over 400 documents in The Online Archive of California on Ramaty's work and remains readily accessible to those who visit the Library of Congress institutions across the U.S.

Ramaty's most notable work includes the early predictions and observations of low energy metagalactic cosmic rays which were first published in 1971 and co-authored by Lennard A. Fisk at the Goddard Space Flight Centre. The paper is a foundation on which later findings on low-energy cosmic rays was built on as Ramaty applied previous understandings of universal cosmic ray models produced by Giancarlo Setti. Using this work, Ramaty continued to pursue his studies in low energy cosmic rays and has published multiple papers on the subject, five of which are available on The Online Archive of California. His early work in the field has been credited by Richard Lingenfelter, Neil Gehrels and Thomas L. Cline as essential for the current discoveries being made through the RHESSI project. In 1973 Ramaty published his first paper on solar flare nuclear gamma rays where he discussed the observations of gamma-ray line emissions from solar flares and gave estimations in spectrum quantity and proton counts from solar flares through these observations. This work in solar flare emissions is reflected in his later papers from 1973 to 1989, which allowed for closer observations to be made following the launch of the RHESSI project in 2002.

== Death ==
Ramaty died on April 8, 2001 (age 64) in his home in Silver Spring, Maryland, due to complications with amyotrophic lateral sclerosis. Reuven now rests at the Rockville Judean Cemetery near Olney, Maryland. His wife, two children and extended family lives in Silver Spring, Maryland.
