= Subir Sarkar =

Indian physicist

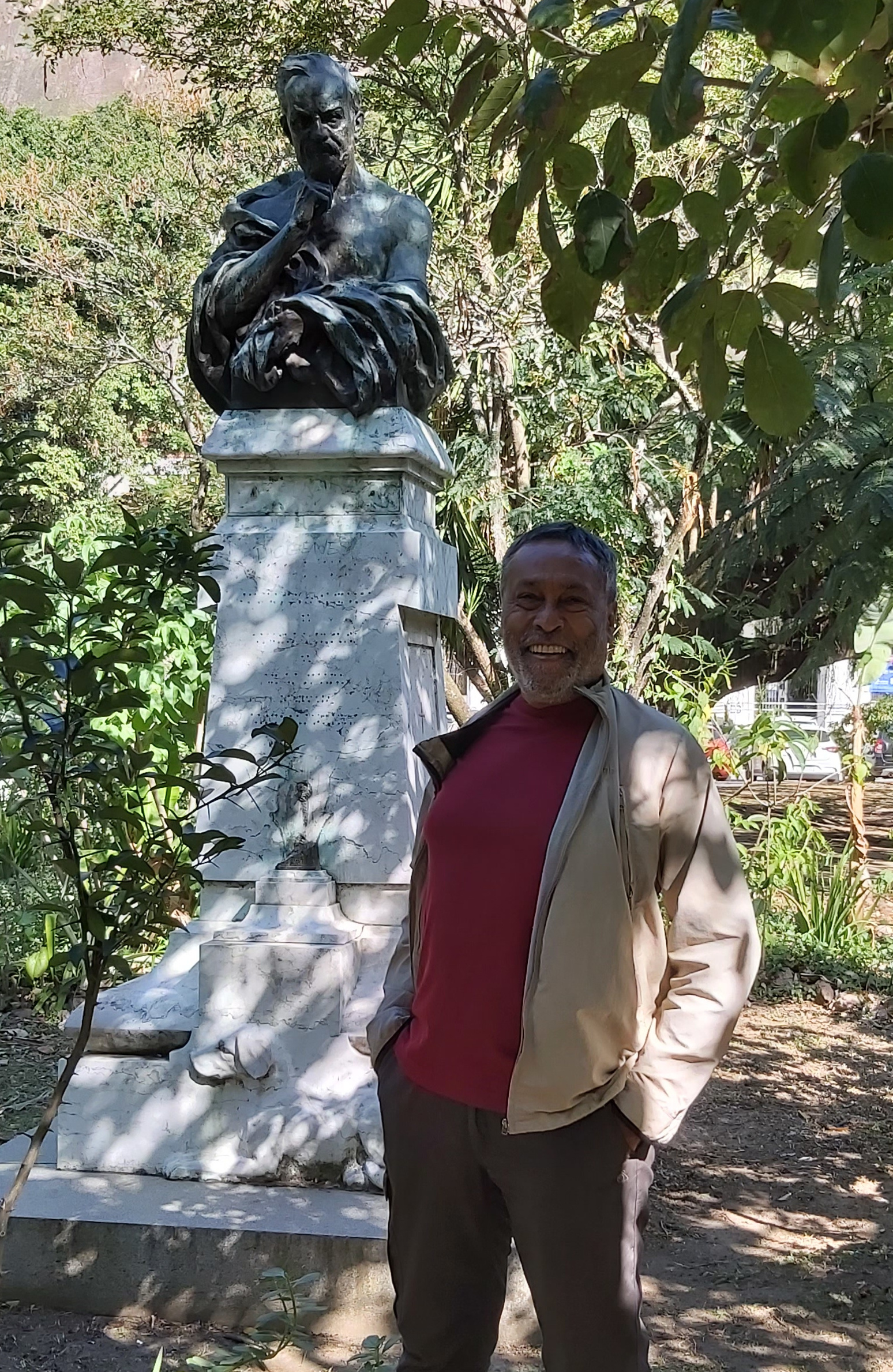
- Professor Subir Sarkar at UNIRIO in Rio de Janeiro, Brazil (June 2025)
- Born: 12 September 1953 (age 73); Ichapore, India
- Education: IIT Kharagpur (B.Sc. and M.Sc.); Tata Institute of Fundamental Research (Ph.D.)
- Awards: Homi Bhabha Medal and Prize (2017); Bruno Rossi Prize for the IceCube collaboration (2021)
- Scientific career
- Fields: Cosmology, High Energy Physics, Astroparticle Physics
- Workplaces: Oxford University, CERN, Tata Institute of Fundamental Research
- Doctoral advisor: Ramanath Cowsik
- Website: www.physics.ox.ac.uk/our-people/sarkar

Subir Sarkar (12 September 1953, Ichapore, India) is an Indian astroparticle physicist and cosmologist, known for his research on the dark sector and astroparticle physics. He has been at the Rudolf Peierls Centre for Theoretical Physics, Oxford University, since 1990, and was Head of the Oxford Particle Theory Group (2011-2019). He was also Niels Bohr Professor at the Niels Bohr Institute, University of Copenhagen (2013-2018). Since 2021, he has been Emeritus Professor and Emeritus Fellow of Linacre College, Oxford.

He was on the Advisory Board of the Gruber Cosmology Prize from 2014 to 2020 and has served since 2021 on Commission C4 (Astroparticle Physics) of the International Union of Pure and Applied Physics.

== Education and career ==
After completing secondary school in 1969, Sarkar studied at IIT Kharagpur, where he graduated with a B.Sc. in 1972 and an M.Sc. in 1974. He then joined the Tata Institute of Fundamental Research (TIFR), where he was appointed as a research associate in the Cosmic Rays Group in 1979 and was awarded a PhD in Physics in 1982. In 1983, he was a visiting fellow at the International School for Advanced Studies (Scuola Internazionale Superiore di Studi Avanzati; SISSA) in Trieste and during 1984–1985 a research associate in CERN's Theory Division. For the academic year 1985–1986, he was a visiting fellow at the University of Oxford's Department of Astrophysics and during 1987–1988 a research associate in the HEP Theory Group of Rutherford Appleton Laboratory (RAL) in Chilton, Oxfordshire. From 1988 to 1989 he worked in Bhopal for an Indian NGO (Eklavya), specialising in science education and popularisation. In 1990 Sarkar became a staff member of the University of Oxford's Rudolf Peierls Centre for Theoretical Physics. He was a visiting scholar at Wolfson College, Oxford from 1991 to 1993 and a research fellow from 1993 to 1997. During 1997-1998, he was a departmental lecturer and a tutor in physics at Pembroke College, Oxford. He was appointed as a University lecturer in 1998, promoted to reader in 2000, and professor in 2006, retiring as professor emeritus in 2021. Sarkar headed the Oxford Particle Theory Group from 2011 to 2019. He has also been an adjunct faculty member at TIFR and at the Raman Research Institute, Bangalore.

Sarkar's research deals with relations between fundamental physics and aspects of astrophysics and cosmology and has a wide range, including dark matter, primordial nucleosynthesis, cosmological phase transitions, cosmological inflation, large-scale structure of the universe, and problems with the ΛCDM model. He has also participated in experiments such as the Pierre Auger Observatory, the Big European Bubble Chamber (BEBC), the IceCube Neutrino Observatory, and the Cherenkov Telescope Array in investigations of very high energy cosmic rays and neutrinos. He is a member of the Dark Energy Science Collaboration of the Vera C. Rubin Observatory. He was a founder member of the India Oxford Initiative, which began funding projects in 2019.

== Personal life ==
Subir Sarkar is married to Amanda Cooper-Sarkar, a particle physicist in the Department of Physics, Oxford University.

== Awards and honours ==
In 2017, Sarkar was awarded the Homi Bhabha Medal and Prize. In 2021, he shared the Bruno Rossi Prize awarded to Francis Halzen and the IceCube collaboration. Sarkar's collaborators and former students held a celebration from 11 to 13 September 2023 in honour of his career achievements and his 70th birthday.

== Selected publications ==
- Sarkar, Subir (2004). "New physics from ultrahigh energy cosmic rays". Acta Physica Polonica B. 35: 351–364. arXiv:hep-ph/0312223.
- Sarkar, Subir (2018). "Is dark matter self-interacting?". Nature Astronomy. 2: 856–857. arXiv:hep-ph/0202013.
- Abel, S.A.; Sarkar, S.; White, P.L. (1995). "On the cosmological domain wall problem for the minimally extended supersymmetric standard model". Nuclear Physics B. 454 (3): 663–681. arXiv:hep-ph/9506359. Bibcode:1995NuPhB.454..663A. doi:10.1016/0550-3213(95)00483-9.
- Sarkar, Subir (1996). "Big bang nucleosynthesis and physics beyond the standard model". Reports on Progress in Physics. 59 (12): 1493–1609. arXiv:hep-ph/9602260. Bibcode:1996RPPh...59.1493S. doi:10.1088/0034-4885/59/12/001.
- Birkel, Michael; Sarkar, Subir (1998). "Extremely high energy cosmic rays from relic particle decays". Astroparticle Physics. 9 (4): 297–309. arXiv:hep-ph/9804285. Bibcode:1998APh.....9..297B. doi:10.1016/S0927-6505(98)00028-0.
- Sarkar, Subir (2002). "Possible Astrophysical Probes of Quantum Gravity". Modern Physics Letters A. 17 (15n17): 1025–1035. arXiv:gr-qc/0204092. Bibcode:2002MPLA...17.1025S. doi:10.1142/S0217732302007521.
- Beyer, Konstantin A.; Sarkar, Subir (2023). "Ruling out light axions: The writing is on the wall". SciPost Physics. 15 (1): 003. arXiv:2211.14635. Bibcode:2023ScPP...15....3B. doi:10.21468/SciPostPhys.15.1.003.
