= Lingenfelter =

Lingenfelter is a German surname. Notable people with the surname include:

- Dwain Lingenfelter (born 1949), Canadian politician from Saskatchewan
- John Lingenfelter (1945–2003), American NHRA driver, engineer and tuner
- Richard Lingenfelter (1934–2021), American physicist and historian
- Steve Lingenfelter (born 1958), American basketball player
- Tom Lingenfelter (born 1939), American political activist
- Matthew Lingenfelter (born 1979), American Federal Government USDA USFS
