= Homi Bhabha Medal and Prize =

Physics award

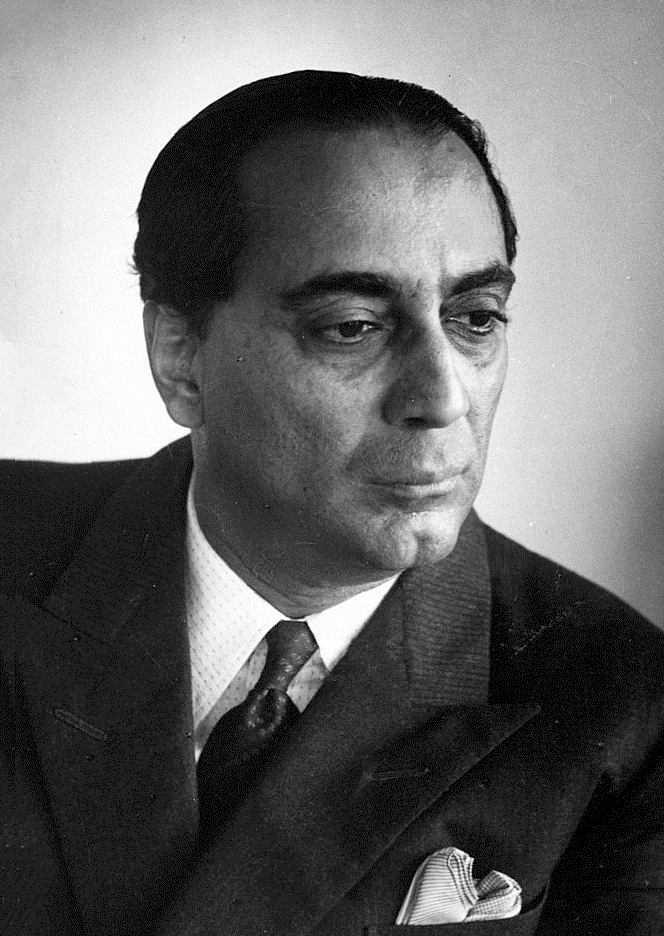
Homi Jehangir Bhabha (1909 - 1966), Indian nuclear theoretical physicist

The Homi Bhabha Medal and Prize is awarded every two years, jointly by the International Union of Pure and Applied Physics (IUPAP) and the Tata Institute of Fundamental Research (TIFR). The award, established in 2010 in honor of Homi J. Bhabha, consists of a certificate, a medal, an award of 250,000 Indian rupees (about US$ 3000, as of 2025), and an invitation to visit and to give public lectures at the TIFR in Mumbai and the Cosmic Ray Laboratory in Ooty. The award ceremony take place at the biennial International Cosmic Ray Conference (ICRC). The recipient is "an active scientist who has made distinguished contributions in the field of high-energy cosmic-ray physics and astroparticle physics over an extended academic career." The inaugural award was made in 2011 to Sir Arnold Wolfendale.

There are several different awards named in honor of the physicist Homi J. Bhabha — for example, the Homi Bhabha Medal (in five different categories) awarded by the Nuclear Fuel Complex of the Department of Atomic Energy of the Government of India.

== Recipients ==
Year	Recipient	Institution
2011	Sir Arnold Wolfendale	Durham University, Durham, England, UK
2013	Heinz Völk	Max Planck Institute for Nuclear Physics, Heidelberg, Germany
2015	Thomas K. Gaisser	Bartol Research Institute, University of Delaware, USA
2017	Subir Sarkar	University of Oxford, UK & Niels Bohr Institute, Copenhagen, Denmark
2019	Takaaki Kajita	Institute for Cosmic Ray Research (ICRR), University of Tokyo, Japan
2021	Francis Halzen	University of Wisconsin, Madison, USA
2023	Samuel C. C. Ting	Massachusetts Institute of Technology (MIT), USA
2025	Barry C. Barish	California Institute of Technology (Caltech), USA

== See also ==
- List of physics awards
