= Michael Hillas =

English physicist

Alexander Michael Hillas (June 1932 – 26 November 2017) was an English cosmic ray physicist. He is known for the Gaisser–Hillas function, the Hillas parameters, and MOCCA, a Monte Carlo computer code used for simulation of extensive air showers (EASs) in the energy range from 10^{12} (tera-) eV to 10^{21} (zetta-) eV.

== Early life and education ==
Born in a village near Leeds, A. Michael Hillas attended school in York. He studied at Bootham School from 1947 to 1950. In secondary school, he showed remarkable signs of talent for computation. At the University of Leeds, he graduated with a B.Sc. in physics in 1955 with First Class Honours and with a Ph.D. in 1958. His Ph.D. thesis is entitled The interaction of stopped negative muons with atomic nuclei. As a postdoc, Hillas held a fellowship at Harwell Science and Innovation Campus. In 1959 at Harwell, Michael Hillas and Thomas Edwin "Ted" Cranshaw (1922–2016) measured, with extreme accuracy, the charge difference between the proton and the electron. (Cranshaw was nominated for a Nobel Prize in 1966 by Yukihisa "Yuki" Nogami, a former doctoral student of Hideki Yukawa.) Hillas worked at Harwell on an experiment to study air showers from cosmic rays. The experiment used an array of approximately 90 Geiger counters deployed over an area of .6 km^{2} (about 148 acres). As part of the experimental team, he had to get up at night to repair cables that had been bitten through by rabbits. The Harwell Safety Officer William Galbraith was alarmed by the way Hillas waded around wet enclosures that housed Geiger counters for muons and had kilovolts of dangerous voltage.

== Career ==
Hillas returned to the University of Leeds in 1959 as a lecturer. Professor John Graham Wilson (1911–1994) at the University of Leeds initiated the study of cosmic rays in a project implemented at Haverah Park and persuaded Hillas to work on the interpretation of data from the project. At the University of Leeds, Hillas was promoted in 1969 from lectureship to readership and in 1990 to a professorial chair in physics. In retirement, he remained in the department of physics and astronomy as a research professor working on TeV (tera-electronvolt) gamma-ray astronomy. He did outstanding research in numerical modelling for cosmic ray physics. His Monte Carlo computer program, MOCCA, for high-energy air shower studies, was used extensively in the design of the Pierre Auger Observatory. MOCCA was written in Pascal and was widely used by the Auger Collaboration (despite their unfamiliarity of the computer language Pascal) and, notably, by the Nobel Laureate, James Cronin, during a sabbatical visit to the University Leeds in 1991. MOCCA was eventually translated into FORTRAN.

Hillas combined outstanding talents as a numerical modeller with good physical insight, as well as considerable ability as an experimentalist. He gained an international reputation as a pioneer of selecting gamma-ray images based on their predicted properties. In the late 1980s, Hillas published his ideas about techniques for distinguishing between gamma rays and hadrons in the cosmic rays at energies around one tera-electronvolt (1 TeV). The concept involves using large mirrors to detect the Cherenkov radiation which these low-energy cosmic-rays produce in Earth's atmosphere. The "Hillas parameters" are used world-wide in cosmic ray research and play an essential role for the Cherenkov Telescope Array, which detects gamma rays in the energy range from 10 GeV to about 300 TeV. In the early part of the 21st century he was a member of the VERITAS science team.

== Awards and honours ==
In 1998 the Institute of Physics (IOP) awarded Hillas the institute's Rutherford Medal and Prize. In 2005 the Commission on Astrophysical Particles of the International Union of Pure and Applied Physics (IUPAP) awarded him the Yodh Prize “for his significant and outstanding contributions to the field of cosmic ray astrophysics”.

== Selected publications ==
- Hillas, A. M.; Ouldridge, M. (1975). "Cosmic rays and the Galaxy". Nature. 253 (5493): 609–610. Bibcode:1975Natur.253..609H. doi:10.1038/253609a0.
- Hillas, A. M. (1982). "Angular and energy distributions of charged particles in electron-photon cascades in air". Journal of Physics G: Nuclear Physics. 8 (10): 1461–1473. Bibcode:1982JPhG....8.1461H. doi:10.1088/0305-4616/8/10/016.
- Hillas, A. M. (1982). "The sensitivity of Cerenkov radiation pulses to the longitudinal development of cosmic-ray showers". Journal of Physics G: Nuclear Physics. 8 (10): 1475–1492. Bibcode:1982JPhG....8.1475H. doi:10.1088/0305-4616/8/10/017.
- Hillas, A. M. (1984). "The Origin of Ultra-High-Energy Cosmic Rays". Annual Review of Astronomy and Astrophysics. 22: 425–444. Bibcode:1984ARA&A..22..425H. doi:10.1146/annurev.aa.22.090184.002233.
- Hillas, A. M. (1989). "The South Pole Air Shower Experiment". Frontier Objects in Astrophysics and Particle Physics: 309. Bibcode:1989foap.conf..309H.
- Hillas, A. M. (1996). "Differences Between Gamma-Ray and Hadronic Showers". TeV Gamma-Ray Astrophysics. pp. 17–30. doi:10.1007/978-94-009-0171-1_2. ISBN 978-94-010-6561-0.
- Hillas, A.M. (1999). "Are we making progress in finding the sources of the most energetic cosmic rays?". Nuclear Physics B - Proceedings Supplements. 75 (1–2): 109–118. Bibcode:1999NuPhS..75..109H. doi:10.1016/S0920-5632(99)00221-2.
- Hillas, A. M. (2005). "Can diffusive shock acceleration in supernova remnants account for high-energy galactic cosmic rays?". Journal of Physics G: Nuclear and Particle Physics. 31 (5): R95–R131. doi:10.1088/0954-3899/31/5/R02.
- Hillas, A. M. (2006). "Cosmic Rays: Recent Progress and some Current Questions". arXiv:astro-ph/0607109.
- Hillas, A.M. (2013). "Evolution of ground-based gamma-ray astronomy from the early days to the Cherenkov Telescope Arrays". Astroparticle Physics. 43: 19–43. Bibcode:2013APh....43...19H. doi:10.1016/j.astropartphys.2012.06.002.

=== Books ===
- Hillas, A. M. (22 October 2013). Cosmic Rays: The Commonwealth and International Library: Selected Readings in Physics. Elsevier. ISBN 978-1-4831-5192-2. (1st edition 1972)
