= Trevor C. Weekes =

Trevor Cecil Weekes (1940, Dublin, Ireland – 2014, Sahuarita, Arizona) was an Irish-born, American astronomer and pioneer of gamma-ray astronomy.

In 1964 Trevor Weekes married Ann Katherine Owens. In 1966 he graduated with a Ph.D. from University College Dublin. His Ph.D. thesis is entitled Radio and optical methods of detecting cosmic rays. He and his wife immigrated to the United States in 1966 and for a brief time lived in Boston. In 1966, Trevor Weekes became a postdoctoral researcher employed by the Smithsonian Astrophysical Observatory. He joined a team, initiated by Giovanni Fazio and Henry F. Helmken (1935–2011), that scavenged parts from searchlight mirrors to experiment with gamma-ray detection in Arizona's Santa Rita Mountains. From 1967 to 1969 on Arizona's Mount Hopkins, Weekes, in collaboration with George H. Rieke, used two searchlight mirrors (each 1.5 meter in diameter) to make observations in the TeV range of gamma rays. In 1969 Tevor Weekes was appointed Resident Director of the Mount Hopkins Observatory, which in 1981 was renamed Fred Lawrence Whipple Observatory. He spent his career living with his family in Sahuarita, Arizona and working for the Smithsonian Astrophysical Observatory, which from 1978 to 1982 suspended research in gamma-ray astronomy — during those years he did research in optical astronomy. With more powerful detectors, Weekes and his team in 1989 established the Crab Nebula as a steady-source of gamma rays above 100 GeV, thus demonstrating the value of ground-based gamma-ray astronomy and motivating construction of more powerful gamma-ray detectors in the energy in the teraelectronvolt to petaelectronvolt range.

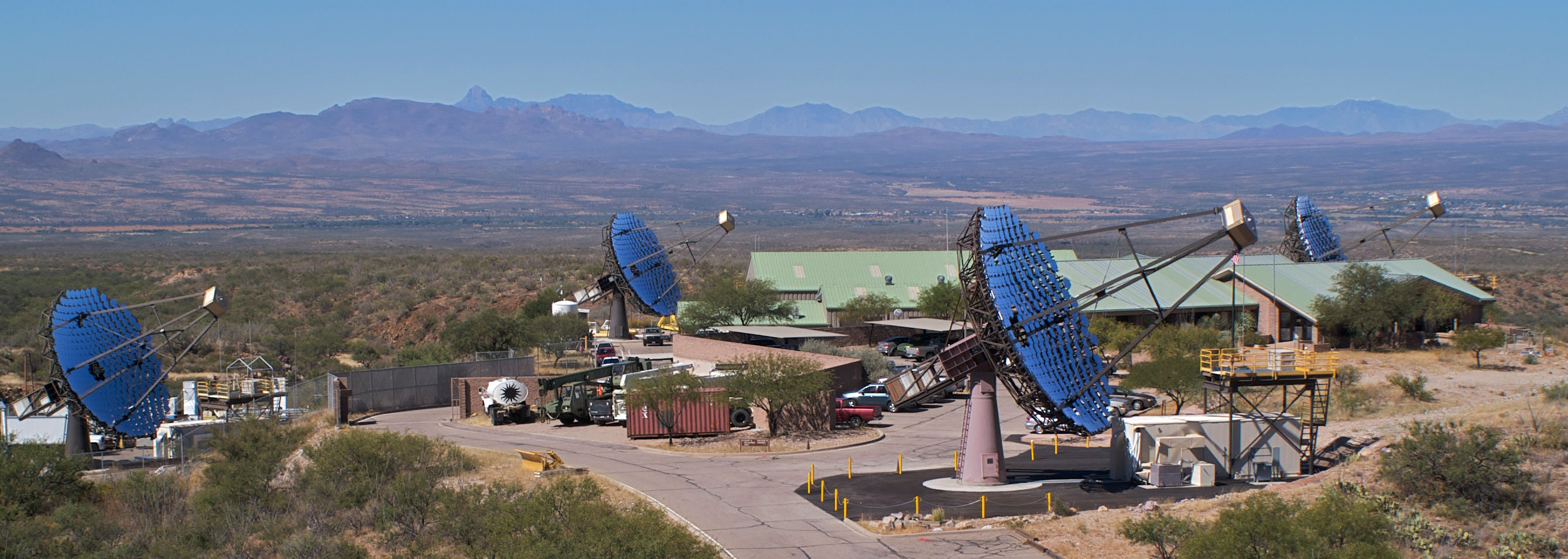
VERITAS — array of 4 telescopes

Weekes was the instigator of the ground-based gamma-ray observatory named VERITAS (Very Energetic Radiation Imaging Telescope Array System). After some difficulties in securing a site, an array of four 12-meter optical reflectors was built near the visitors' center about halfway up to the summit of Mount Hopkins. VERITAS became operational in 2007.

Upon his death he was survived by his widow, three daughters, and four grandchildren.

== Awards and honors ==
Weekes was awarded in 1997 the American Astronomical Society’s Bruno Rossi Prize and in 2007 IUPAP’s Yodh Prize. The National University of Ireland in 1978 and in 2005 the University of Chicago awarded him honorary degrees. In 2001 he was elected a fellow of the American Association for the Advancement of Science. In 2002 he was elected an honorary member of the Royal Irish Academy. In 2013 the "Trevorfest" was held in Tucson.

== Selected publications ==
- Fazio, G. G.; Helmken, H. F.; Rieke, G. H.; Weekes, T. C. (1968). "An experiment to search for discrete sources of cosmic gamma rays in the 10^{11} to 10^{12} eV region". Canadian Journal of Physics. 46 (10): S451 – S455. Bibcode:1968CaJPS..46..451F. doi:10.1139/p68-268.
- Weekes, T. C.; Fazio, G. G.; Helmken, H. F.; O'Mongain, E.; Rieke, G. H. (1972). "A Search for Discrete Sources of Cosmic Gamma Rays of Energy 10^{11}-10^{12} eV". The Astrophysical Journal. 174: 165. Bibcode:1972ApJ...174..165W. doi:10.1086/151479.
- Helmken, H. F.; Weekes, T. C. (1979). "A search for very high energy gamma-ray emission from CG 195+4, and other 100 MeV sources". The Astrophysical Journal. 228: 531. Bibcode:1979ApJ...228..531H. doi:10.1086/156875.
- Weekes, T. C. (1983). "A search for very high energy gamma-ray transients from Cygnus X-3 and PSR 0531". Astronomy and Astrophysics. 121: 232. Bibcode:1983A&A...121..232W.
- Lamb, R. C.; Weekes, T. C. (1987). "Very High Energy Gamma-Ray Binary Stars". Science. 238 (4833): 1528–1534. Bibcode:1987Sci...238.1528L. doi:10.1126/science.238.4833.1528. PMID 17784290.
- Weekes, Trevor C. (1989). "Gamma-ray astronomy at the highest energies". Nuclear Instruments and Methods in Physics Research Section A: Accelerators, Spectrometers, Detectors and Associated Equipment. 280 (2–3): 349–357. Bibcode:1989NIMPA.280..349W. doi:10.1016/0168-9002(89)90931-5.
- Weekes, T. C.; Cawley, M. F.; Fegan, D. J.; Gibbs, K. G.; Hillas, A. M.; Kowk, P. W.; Lamb, R. C.; Lewis, D. A.; MacOmb, D.; Porter, N. A.; Reynolds, P. T.; Vacanti, G. (1989). "Observation of TeV gamma rays from the Crab nebula using the atmospheric Cerenkov imaging technique". The Astrophysical Journal. 342: 379. Bibcode:1989ApJ...342..379W. doi:10.1086/167599.
- Halzen, F.; Zas, E.; MacGibbon, J. H.; Weekes, T. C. (1991). "Gamma rays and energetic particles from primordial black holes". Nature. 353 (6347): 807–815. Bibcode:1991Natur.353..807H. doi:10.1038/353807a0.
- Pomarède, D.; Boyle, P.J; Urban, M.; Badran, H.M; Behr, L.; Brunetti, M.T; Fegan, D.J; Weekes, T.C (2001). "Search for shadowing of primary cosmic radiation by the moon at TeV energies". Astroparticle Physics. 14 (4): 287–317. Bibcode:2001APh....14..287P. doi:10.1016/S0927-6505(00)00126-2.
- Weekes, T. C. (2003). "TeV Gamma-ray Observations and the Origin of Cosmic Rays: I". arXiv:astro-ph/0312179.
- Horan, D.; Weekes, T.C (2004). "Extragalactic sources of TeV gamma rays: A summary". New Astronomy Reviews. 48 (5–6): 527–535. arXiv:astro-ph/0310391. Bibcode:2004NewAR..48..527H. doi:10.1016/j.newar.2003.12.057.

=== Books ===
- Weekes, Trevor C. (1969). High-energy astrophysics. London: Chapman and Hall. ISBN 0389010669. LCCN 70006409; xi+209 pages, illustrated
- Weekes, Trevor C., ed. (1979). The MMT and the future of ground-based astronomy: proceedings of a symposium held to mark the dedication of the Multiple Mirror Telescope at the Mount Hopkins Observatory, Arizona, on May 9, 1979. SAO special report; no. 385. Cambridge, Massachusetts: Smithsonian Astrophysical Observatory. LCCN 79126970; x+210 pages, illustrated (See Multiple Mirror Telescope.)
- Ramana Murthy, P. V.; Weekes, Trevor C. (eds.). Proceedings of the International Workshop on Very High Energy Gamma Ray Astronomy, Ootacamund, India, September 20-25, 1982. Bombay, India: Tata Institute of Fundamental Research. LCCN 84903351; xv, 325 pages, illustrated
- Weekes, Trevor C. (2003). Very high energy gamma-ray astronomy. Series in astronomy and astrophysics. CRC Press. ISBN 0750306580. LCCN 2003282204; xv+221 pages, illustrated
