= Robin Devenish =

British physicist

- Education: St John's College, Cambridge
- Known for: Deep inelastic scattering
- Awards: Max Born Prize (2009)
- Scientific career
- Workplaces: University of Oxford; DESY
- Doctoral students: Terry Wyatt Phillip Hallam-Baker

Robin Devenish was a physicist at the University of Oxford. An Emeritus Fellow of Hertford College, Devenish was a former Dean of Hertford College, University of Oxford, Fellow and Tutor of Physics. He was known for his work in the field of deep inelastic scattering, and was awarded the Max Born Prize in December 2009 for his work in this field, in which he was active until his death.

== Education and early career ==
Devenish was educated by the Benedictines at St Benedict's School, Ealing before attending St John's College, Cambridge. He joined Oxford in 1979 having held various research positions in UK Universities and at the DESY Laboratory in Hamburg after finishing his doctorate in 1968.

With Amanda Cooper-Sarkar, Devenish co-authored a book on the subject of deep inelastic scattering, entitled Deep Inelastic Scattering.

== Awards and honours ==
The Max Born prize (announced in December 2008) was awarded to Devenish in March 2009. The prize was awarded by the IoP because: "Devenish's work has led to important advances in our understanding of the structure of nucleons, in particular that of the proton. Devenish played a key role in the determination of the structure functions of the proton and the derivation of the quark and gluon densities at small Bjorken x, which has led to major advances in the understanding of Quantum Chromodynamics.".
