= Yodh Prize =

Biennial physics award

- Description: Recognition of an outstanding career in cosmic ray research
- Presented by: University of California, Irvine / IUPAP
- Website: ps.uci.edu/yodh-prize

The Yodh Prize, awarded every two years, honors a scientist for that scientist's outstanding career in cosmic ray research.

== Background ==
The award ceremony takes place at the International Cosmic Ray Conference (ICRC). The recipient is selected by the Commission on Astroparticle Physics of the International Union of Pure and Applied Physics (IUPAP) on behalf of the University of California Irvine Foundation, which sponsors the prize. The prize winner gives a talk at UC Irvine's department of physics and astronomy. In 1998 Gaurang Bhaskar Yodh (1928–2019) and his wife Kanwal G. Yodh (1928–2015) endowed the prize to the UC Irvine Foundation.

The inaugural winner of the Yodh Prize was Reuven Ramaty. He was severely ill with amyotrophic lateral sclerosis (ALS) at the time in April 2001 of his selection by the IUPAP and died about one week after he was informed of the honor.

== Yodh Prize recipients ==
Year	Recipient	Institution at time of award	Citation
2001	Reuven Ramaty	NASA Goddard Space Flight Center	For his significant and outstanding contributions to the field of cosmic ray astrophysics.
2003	B. V. Sreekantan	National Institute of Advanced Studies, Bangalore	For his significant and outstanding contributions to the field of cosmic ray astrophysics.
2005	A. Michael Hillas	University of Leeds	For his significant and outstanding contributions to the field of cosmic ray astrophysics.
2007	Trevor C. Weekes	Harvard–Smithsonian Center for Astrophysics	For his significant and outstanding contributions to the field of cosmic ray astrophysics.
2009	Dietrich Müller	University of Chicago	For his leadership in path-breaking experiments in cosmic ray astrophysics.
2011	W. Vernon Jones	NASA Headquarters	For his outstanding contributions to balloon-borne cosmic ray and particle astrophysics experiments.
2013	Motohiko Nagano	University of Tokyo	For his pioneering leadership in the experimental study of the highest energy cosmic rays.
2015	Werner Hofmann	Max Planck Institute for Nuclear Physics, Heidelberg	For his outstanding leadership in the field of high-energy gamma-ray astronomy.
2017	Jordan Goodman	University of Maryland	For his outstanding leadership in the development of water Cherenkov instruments in high-energy gamma-ray astronomy.
2019	Francis Halzen	University of Wisconsin	His leadership and landmark contributions cleared a path for the emergence of neutrino astronomy.
2021	Anthony Raymond Bell	University of Oxford	His theoretical contributions led to a breakthrough in understanding the acceleration of cosmic rays by amplified magnetic fields.
2023	John Learned	University of Hawaiʻi	For his groundbreaking ideas and profound influence on the early development of neutrino astronomy.
