= Amanda Cooper-Sarkar =

English particle physicist

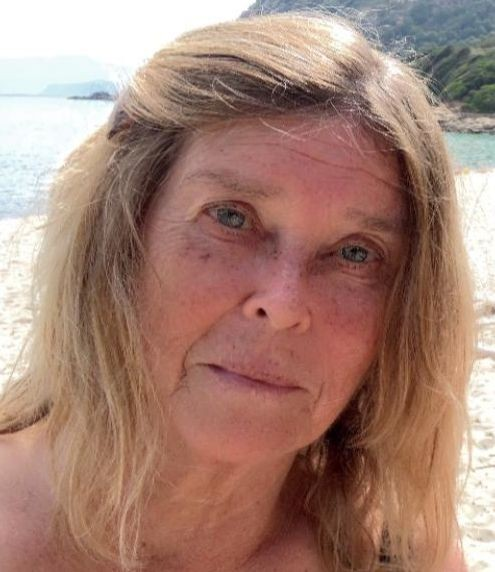
- Born: Amanda Margaret Cooper
- Education: University of Oxford (DPhil, 1975)
- Known for: Deep inelastic scattering; Parton distribution functions
- Spouse: Subir Sarkar
- Awards: Institute of Physics Nuclear and Particle Physics Divisional Prize (2009); James Chadwick Medal and Prize (2015)
- Scientific career
- Fields: Particle physics
- Workplaces: University of Oxford; CERN; Rutherford Appleton Laboratory

Amanda Margaret Cooper-Sarkar (née Cooper) is a British experimental particle physicist and Professor Emeritus of Physics at the University of Oxford, known for her pioneering contributions to the study of deep inelastic scattering and the determination of parton distribution functions (PDFs) of the proton. Her research has played a key role in testing and refining quantum chromodynamics (QCD), the theory of the strong interaction, and in providing essential inputs for analyses at the Large Hadron Collider (LHC).

== Early life and education ==
Cooper-Sarkar was born in Liverpool and attended Oxford for her undergraduate and graduate education. She earned her DPhil in particle physics from the University of Oxford in 1975. After postdoctoral appointments at the Tata Institute of Fundamental Research in Mumbai and the National Laboratory for High Energy Physics (KEK) in Tsukuba, she joined the Rutherford Appleton Laboratory (RAL) in Oxfordshire. From 1979 to 1987, she worked on neutrino scattering experiments using the Big European Bubble Chamber (BEBC) at CERN and served as a CERN Fellow from 1983 to 1985.

== Career ==
She left academia to work at an educational institute in Bhopal, India, but in 1990, with the birth of her first child, she returned to Oxford with a plan to "combine undergraduate teaching with childcare, soft-peddling on the research". She became a Beale Fellow and Senior Tutor in Physics at St Hilda's College, Oxford. She later wrote that, although these steps delayed her research career by 10 or 15 years, they also allowed her to focus more single-mindedly on a single research topic, "which was ultimately what made me into a world expert in my field". In 2008 she became a professor of particle physics at the University of Oxford. Cooper-Sarkar was part of the ZEUS collaboration, and is also part of the ATLAS collaboration.

== Research ==
Cooper-Sarkar is an expert on the deep structure of the nucleon. Her work focuses on how the constituents of protons and neutrons, quarks and gluons, collectively known as partons, are distributed in momentum and how these distributions evolve according to the predictions of QCD. Deep inelastic scattering (DIS) experiments probe these distributions, known as parton distribution functions (PDFs), and form the basis for understanding hadronic cross-sections and testing the Standard Model at modern colliders.

=== Neutrino scattering experiments ===
During her time at RAL and CERN, Cooper-Sarkar led studies of neutrino and antineutrino interactions with nuclear targets in the BEBC experiments WA25, WA59, and WA66. Her analyses provided early insight into the so-called "EMC effect," an anomaly in parton distributions in nuclear environments that revealed the influence of nuclear matter on quark behaviour. She led early searches for physics beyond the Standard Model (BSM) in neutrino data, ruling out a light supersymmetric gluino and setting limits on heavy neutral lepton mixing with light neutrinos, a constraint that remains relevant today.

=== HERA and ZEUS experiments ===
In 1987, Cooper-Sarkar joined the ZEUS experiment at the electron–proton collider HERA in Hamburg to extend DIS studies to a new kinematic regime. She led the first studies exploring the longitudinal structure function at very small momentum fractions (x), which enabled the extraction of the gluon momentum distribution in the proton. Early ZEUS data confirmed that the proton structure function F_{2} rises steeply with decreasing x, a key, although largely unexpected, experimental validation of perturbative QCD, which hints at the need to consider non-linear parton interactions, beyond the conventional DGLAP formalism for perturbative QCD calculations. This is an area which is still at the research forefront.

Her analyses through the 1990s established the quantitative behaviour of gluon and sea-quark distributions and guided theoretical developments on the low-x and low-Q^{2} limits of QCD. She co-authored a comprehensive review, "Structure Functions of the Nucleon and Their Interpretation" (1998), and later co-wrote the textbook Deep Inelastic Scattering (Oxford University Press, 2004) with Robin Devenish.

=== QCD analysis and global fits ===
As leader of the ZEUS QCD fitting group from 2000, Cooper-Sarkar produced global PDF fits that accounted for correlated experimental uncertainties. These analyses, particularly the ZEUS-JETS fits, provided the first direct constraints on the gluon density from jet data and enabled a precision determination of the strong coupling constant, α_{s}(M_Z).

She subsequently led the joint H1–ZEUS QCD fitting group (2007–2022), combining data from both HERA experiments to produce a unified and statistically consistent dataset. The HERAPDF2.0 PDF set which resulted from this work remains a valuable reference. The resulting combined HERA data remain foundational in modern collider physics, providing the baseline for all current global PDF determinations.

=== Work with ATLAS and PDF4LHC ===
With the end of the HERA programme, Cooper-Sarkar joined the ATLAS experiment at the LHC in 2004, serving as ATLAS-UK Standard Model Convenor from 2005 to 2008. She emphasized the role of precise PDFs in interpreting LHC cross-sections and co-founded the PDF4LHC working group in 2007. This group provides recommendations for the use of PDFs by collider collaborations, as well as the PDF4LHC PDF sets, which are a statistical combination of the PDFs produced by the global PDF fitting groups CT, MSHT and NNPDF. Cooper-Sarkar became the chairperson of the PDF4LHC in 2022.

Her contributions to ATLAS include the development of the APPLgrid project for fast QCD calculations and the creation of the open-source HERAFitter (now xFitter) framework for global PDF fitting. She co-founded and led the ATLAS PDF Forum as its convenor 2012/3 and again in 2016/2018. She led studies of W^{+}, W^{-} and Z production that revealed an unexpectedly unsuppressed strange-quark distribution at low x. These ATLAS data have improved precision in PDF determinations of all groups. Cooper-Sarkar also led the most recent ATLAS PDF analysis ATLASpdf21, in which systematic correlations between differing classes of ATLAS data were assessed and their impact on percent level accuracy of PDFs was evaluated.

Cooper-Sarkar's work also extended to modelling ultra-high-energy neutrino cross-sections, adopted as benchmarks by the IceCube Neutrino Observatory.

== Recent work ==
Cooper-Sarkar's current research focuses on achieving sub-percent PDF precision necessary for searches for new physics through deviations in Standard Model measurements, such as the W-boson mass. She leads efforts within ATLAS to quantify correlations of systematic uncertainties between different datasets, enabling precision in next-to-next-to-next-to-leading-order (N^{3}LO) QCD and QED-corrected global fits. Her leadership in the PDF4LHC21 combination (2022) has resulted in the most comprehensive unification of global PDF analyses to date.

== Awards and honours ==
- Institute of Physics James Chadwick Medal and Prize (2015), for "her study of deep-inelastic scattering of leptons on nuclei which has revealed the internal structure of the proton".
- IOP Particle Physics Divisional Prize 2009
- Leverhulme Emeritus Fellowship 2019–2024
- Fellow of St Hilda's College, Oxford, where she also served as Vice Principal.
- Editorial board chair of multiple international collaborations, including ZEUS and ATLAS, and chair of PDF4LHC group.
- International Advisory Committee member for Deep Inelastic Scattering Workshops and Low-x Workshops
- Referee for Physical Review Letters, Physical Review D, European Physical Journal C

== Selected publications ==
- H1 and ZEUS Collaborations (F. D. Aaron et al.). "Combined measurement and QCD analysis of the inclusive e±p scattering cross sections at HERA." J. High Energy Phys. 2010 (1):109. DOI: 10.1007/JHEP01(2010)109.
- H1 and ZEUS Collaborations (H. Abramowicz et al.). "Combination of measurements of inclusive deep inelastic e±p scattering cross sections and QCD analysis of HERA data." Eur. Phys. J. C 75 (2015)12,580. DOI: 10.1140/epjc/s10052-015-3710-4.
- Butterworth J., Carrazza S., Cooper-Sarkar A., de Roeck A., Feltesse J., Forte S., Gao J., Glazov S., Huston J., Kassabov Z., McNulty A., Morsch A., Nadolsky P., Radescu V., Rojo J., Thorne R. S. "PDF4LHC recommendations for LHC Run II." J. Phys. G – Nucl. Part. Phys. 43 (2016) 023001. DOI: 10.1088/0954-3899/43/2/023001.
- Lin H. W., Nocera E., Olness F., Orginos K., Rojo J., Accardi A., Alexandrou C., Bacchetta A., Bozzi G., Chen J. W., Collins S., Cooper-Sarkar A., Constantinou M., Del Debbio L., Engelhardt M., Green J., Gupta R., Harland-Lang L. A., Ishikawa T., Kusina A., ... et al. "Parton distributions and lattice QCD calculations: A community white paper." Prog. Part. Nucl. Phys. 102 (2018) 1-31. DOI: 10.1016/j.ppnp.2018.01.007.
- Ball R., Butterworth J., Cooper-Sarkar A., Courtoy A., Cridge T., de Roeck A.,et al. "The PDF4LHC21 combination of global PDF fits for the LHC Run III." J. Phys. G – Nucl. Part. Phys. 49 (2022) 8, 080501. DOI: 10.1088/1361-6471/ac7126.
- ATLAS Collaboration (G. Aad et al.). "Determination of the parton distribution functions of the proton using diverse ATLAS data from pp collisions at √s= 7, 8 and 13 TeV." Eur. Phys. J. C 82 (2022)5,438. DOI: 10.1140/epjc/s10052-022-1

== Personal life ==
Amanda Cooper-Sarkar is married to Subir Sarkar, a cosmologist at the Rudolf Peierls Centre for Theoretical Physics, University of Oxford.
