= Jordan A. Goodman =

American physicist

Jordan A. Goodman is an American physicist whose expertise is in particle astrophysics. He is the former Chair of Physics Department, at the University of Maryland. In 2009, Goodman was elected a fellow of the American Association for the Advancement of Science. In 2017 he was awarded the Yodh Prize.

== Education ==
- Undergraduate: B.S., Physics, University of Maryland - 1973
- Graduate: M.S., Physics, University of Maryland - 1975
- Ph.D., Physics, University of Maryland - 1978

== Publications ==
- Measurement of the atmospheric neutrino energy spectrum from 100 GeV to 400 TeV with IceCube, Phys. Rev. D 83, 012001 (2011)
- Constraints on high-energy neutrino emission from SN 2008D. (R. Abbasi et al.) Astron. Astrophys. 527:A28, 2011. [arXiv:1101.3942]
- Search for neutrino-induced cascades with five years of AMANDA data. (R. Abbasi, et al.) Astropart. Phys. 34:420-430, 2011.
- Search for a Lorentz-violating sidereal signal with atmospheric neutrinos in IceCube. (R. Abbasi et al.) Phys. Rev. D 82:112003, 2010. [arXiv:1010.4096]
- Search for relativistic magnetic monopoles with the AMANDA-II neutrino telescope. By R. Abbasi, et al., Eur. Phys. J. C 69:361-378, 2010.
- The first search for extremely-high energy cosmogenic neutrinos with the IceCube Neutrino Observatory. (R. Abbasi et al.) Phys. Rev. D 82:072003, 2010. [arXiv:1009.1442]
- Measurement of the Anisotropy of Cosmic Ray Arrival Directions with IceCube. (R. Abbasi et al.) Astrophys. J. 718:L194, 2010. [arXiv:1005.2960]
- The Energy Spectrum of Atmospheric Neutrinos between 2 and 200 TeV with the AMANDA-II Detector. (R. Abbasi et al.) Astropart. Phys. 34:48-58, 2010. [arXiv:1004.2357]
- Limits on a muon flux from Kaluza-Klein dark matter annihilations in the Sun from the IceCube 22-string detector. (R. Abbasi et al.) Phys. Rev. D 81:057101, 2010. [arXiv:0910.4480]
- Milagro Observations of TeV Emission from Galactic Sources in the Fermi Bright Source List (A. Abdo et al.) Astrophys. J. Letters Apr 2009 700:L127-L131,(2009)
- Limits on a muon flux from neutralino annihilations in the Sun with the IceCube 22-string detector. (R. Abbasi et al.) Phys. Rev. Lett. 102:201302,(2009)
- Determination of the Atmospheric Neutrino Flux and Searches for New Physics with AMANDA-II. (R. Abbasi et al.) Phys. Rev. D 79:102005,(2009)
- Search for Point Sources of High Energy Neutrinos with Final Data from AMANDA-II. (R. Abbasi et al.). Phys. Rev. D 79:062001,(2009)
- The Large Scale Cosmic-Ray Anisotropy as Observed with Milagro. (A.A. Abdo et al.) Astrophys. J. 698:2121-2130,(2009)
