= Thomas K. Gaisser =

American physicist (1940–2022)

Thomas Korff Gaisser (March 12, 1940, Evansville, Indiana – February 20, 2022, Swarthmore, Pennsylvania) was a particle physicist, cosmic ray researcher, and a pioneer of astroparticle physics. He is known for his book Cosmic Rays and Particle Physics and the Gaisser–Hillas function.

== Biography ==
Thomas K. Gaisser graduated in 1962 from Wabash College with a B.A. in physics. Supported by a Marshall Scholarship, Gaisser sailed in 1962 to England on RMS Queen Elizabeth. Aboard ship, he met Julia Haig, who also held a Marshall Scholarship. In England the two studied at different universities, but their romance deepened when Gaisser wrote to her asking if she would like to see some plays in London during the academic holidays. They married in 1964 and, over decades, he pursued an academic career in physics, while she pursued an academic career in classics and eventually became a professor of Latin at Bryn Mawr College. In 1965 Thomas Gaisser graduated with an M.Sc. in physics from England's University of Bristol. In 1967 he graduated with a Ph.D. from Brown University. His Ph.D. thesis is entitled Solutions of a Model Field Theoretical Equation for the Neutron-Proton Mass Difference. In 1967 Gaisser and his Ph.D. adviser, Herbert Martin Fried (1929–2023), published a paper related to Gaisser's Ph.D. thesis.

From 1967 to 1969, Gaisser was a research associate at Massachusetts Institute of Technology (MIT) and, for the academic year 1969–1970, a NATO postdoctoral fellow at England's University of Cambridge. In 1970, he became an assistant professor at the Bartol Research Foundation, which in 1970 was located at Swarthmore College. In 1977, the Bartol Research Foundation moved to the University of Delaware and was renamed the Bartol Research Institute. (In 2000, the institute was integrated as a center of the University of Delaware's Department of Physics and Astronomy.) At Bartol, Tom transitioned from particle physics to cosmic ray physics. He stayed at Bartol for the remainder of his career. He was promoted in 1974 from assistant professor to associate professor and in 1979 to full professor. Thomas and Julia Gaisser collaborated in the publication of the 1977 paper Partons in Antiquity. From 1976 to 1978, Gaisser was one of the organizers of the Bartol Conference, held in October 1978, in particle astrophysics, bringing together cosmic ray researchers and particle physicists with expertise involving particle accelerators. In 2001 he became the University of Delaware's Martin A. Pomerantz Professor of Physics. He gained an international reputation for his research in modeling complex phenomena in analytic or semi-analytic formulations involving cosmic-ray physics. He is one of the creators of the Monte Carlo event generator called "Sibyll", which is an important simulator for air showers caused by cosmic rays.

Gaisser's research involved calculating the parameters of air showers caused by cosmic rays, computing the antiproton yields of such air showers, and, with Michael Hillas, parameterizing the longitudinal particle density in such air showers. Although primarily a theorist, he traveled to Antarctica for more than 10 seasons, staying for 6 to 7 weeks on each scientific tour. He actively participated in the design and construction of experiments at the Amundsen–Scott South Pole Station. He contributed to the South Pole Air Shower Experiment (SPASE), the Antarctic Muon And Neutrino Detector Array (AMANDA), and, especially, the IceCube Neutrino Observatory with its IceTop surface array measuring air showers. In 1985, Gaisser and his Bartol colleague Todor Stanev calculated the flux of atmospheric neutrinos from Cygnus X-3, a binary star system. Gaisser was the author or co-author of more than 400 scientific articles. He was one of the founding editors of the journal Astroparticle Physics (first published in 1992) and served as a member of the Franklin Institute Committee on Science and the Arts. He is the author of the book Cosmic Rays and Particle Physics (1990); the 2nd edition (2016) was co-authored by Ralph Engel and Elisa Resconi. In 2002, he held a Leverhulme Visiting Professorship at the University of Oxford. In 2003, he and Stuart Pittel were the presenters of the Benjamin Franklin Medal in Physics. From 2007 to 2011 Gaisser was a spokesperson for the IceCube Neutrino Observatory.

== Awards and honors ==
Gaisser was elected a Fellow of the American Astronomical Society and in 1984 a Fellow of the American Physical Society. He received the O'Ceallaigh Medal in 2005 and the Homi Bhabha Medal and Prize in 2015. He was a visiting professor at the Humboldt University of Berlin supported by a Humboldt Research Award in 2009. Gaisser Valley in Antarctica's Cruzen Range is named in his honor.

== Selected publications ==
=== Articles ===
- Gaisser, T. K.; Hillas, A. M. (1977). "Reliability of the Method of Constant Intensity Cuts for Reconstructing the Average Development of Vertical Showers". International Cosmic Ray Conference. 8: 353. Bibcode:1977ICRC....8..353G.
- Gaisser, Thomas K.; Schaefer, Robert K. (1992). "Cosmic-Ray Secondary Antiprotons: A Closer Look". The Astrophysical Journal. 394: 174. Bibcode:1992ApJ...394..174G. doi:10.1086/171568.
- Gaisser, Thomas K.; Halzen, Francis; Stanev, Todor (1995). "Particle astrophysics with high energy neutrinos". Physics Reports. 258 (3): 173–236. arXiv:hep-ph/9410384. Bibcode:1995PhR...258..173G. doi:10.1016/0370-1573(95)00003-Y.
- Gaisser, T. K.; Protheroe, R. J.; Stanev, Todor (1998). "Gamma-Ray Production in Supernova Remnants". The Astrophysical Journal. 492 (1): 219–227. arXiv:astro-ph/9609044. Bibcode:1998ApJ...492..219G. doi:10.1086/305011.
- Ahn, Eun-Joo; Engel, Ralph; Gaisser, Thomas K.; Lipari, Paolo; Stanev, Todor (2009). "Cosmic ray interaction event generator SIBYLL 2.1". Physical Review D. 80 (9) 094003. arXiv:0906.4113. Bibcode:2009PhRvD..80i4003A. doi:10.1103/PhysRevD.80.094003.
- Schönert, Stefan; Gaisser, Thomas K.; Resconi, Elisa; Schulz, Olaf (2009). "Vetoing atmospheric neutrinos in a high energy neutrino telescope". Physical Review D. 79 (4) 043009. arXiv:0812.4308. Bibcode:2009PhRvD..79d3009S. doi:10.1103/PhysRevD.79.043009.
- Gaisser, Thomas K. (2012). "Spectrum of cosmic-ray nucleons, kaon production, and the atmospheric muon charge ratio". Astroparticle Physics. 35 (12): 801–806. arXiv:1111.6675. Bibcode:2012APh....35..801G. doi:10.1016/j.astropartphys.2012.02.010.
- Gaisser, T. K.; Stanev, T.; Tilav, S. (2013). "Cosmic ray energy spectrum from measurements of air showers". Frontiers of Physics. 8 (6): 748–758. arXiv:1303.3565. Bibcode:2013FrPhy...8..748G. doi:10.1007/s11467-013-0319-7.
- Gaisser, Thomas K.; Jero, Kyle; Karle, Albrecht; Van Santen, Jakob (2014). "Generalized self-veto probability for atmospheric neutrinos". Physical Review D. 90 (2) 023009. arXiv:1405.0525. Bibcode:2014PhRvD..90b3009G. doi:10.1103/PhysRevD.90.023009.
- Riehn, Felix; Engel, Ralph; Fedynitch, Anatoli; Gaisser, Thomas K.; Stanev, Todor (2020). "Hadronic interaction model sibyll 2.3d and extensive air showers". Physical Review D. 102 (6) 063002. arXiv:1912.03300. Bibcode:2020PhRvD.102f3002R. doi:10.1103/PhysRevD.102.063002.

=== Books ===
- Gaisser, Thomas K.; Engel, Ralph; Resconi, Elisa (2 June 2016). Cosmic Rays and Particle Physics (2nd ed.). Cambridge University Press. ISBN 978-1-316-59843-6. Gaisser, Thomas K. (1990). 1st edition. Cambridge University Press. ISBN 978-0-521-33931-5.
- Gaisser, Thomas K.; Karle, Albrecht, eds. (20 March 2017). Neutrino Astronomy: Current Status, Future Prospects. World Scientific. ISBN 978-981-4759-42-7.
