= Elisa Resconi =

Italian astroparticle physicist

Elisa Resconi (born 1 December 1971 in Brescia, Italy) is an Italian astroparticle physicist and the Chair of Experimental Physics with Cosmic Particles at the Technical University of Munich, Germany. Her research concentrates on high-energy neutrino astronomy and developing advanced detection technologies for cosmic particles.

== Academic career ==
From 1989 to 1995, Resconi studied physics at the University of Milan. She earned her PhD from the University of Genoa in 2001 under the supervision of G. Manuzio and R. Raghavan. From 2002 to 2005, she worked as a Marie Curie Postdoctoral Fellow at DESY Zeuthen, Germany, and from 2005 to 2011, she led an Emmy Noether research group at the Max Planck Institute for Nuclear Physics in Heidelberg, Germany. After serving as a guest professor at the University of Erlangen-Nuremberg in 2011, she moved to the Technical University of Munich (TUM) and held a Heisenberg Professorship from 2013 to 2016. In 2018, she was appointed Liesel Beckmann Distinguished Professor for Experimental physics at TUM.

Since 2017, Resconi has been the spokesperson of the DFG Collaborative Research Center 1258 (SFB1258) "Neutrinos and Dark Matter in Astrophysics and Particle Physics". In 2022, she received an ERC Advanced Grant for the project ‘Neutrinoshot'. In 2023, Resconi was elected the spokesperson of the Pacific Ocean Neutrino Experiment (P-ONE), an international initiative to construct a high-energy neutrino detector that instruments the waters of the Pacific Ocean. Together with Thomas K. Gaisser and Ralph Engel, Resconi is author of the book Cosmic Rays and Particle Physics (2nd edition, 2016).

== Research ==
Elisa Resconi's research is focused on the detection and analysis of high-energy neutrinos, elementary particles that offer insights into the universe's most energetic astrophysical phenomena. As a member of the IceCube Collaboration, she has been particularly involved in studies linking neutrino emissions to the AGN NGC 1068, a nearby Seyfert galaxy. This discovery provides critical evidence for AGN as potential sources of high-energy cosmic neutrinos and highlights the role of neutrinos in understanding the universe's most extreme environments.

She advocates for developing innovative neutrino observatories and advanced detection techniques, complementing existing high-energy neutrino observatories like IceCube and KM3NeT.

== The Pacific Ocean Neutrino Experiment (P-ONE) ==
Resconi's recent work centers on the Pacific Ocean Neutrino Experiment (P-ONE), an international collaboration to establish a large-scale neutrino observatory in the Pacific Ocean. The experiment seeks to deploy an array of detectors at great depths to capture high-energy neutrinos with unprecedented precision using the subsea infrastructure of the NEPTUNE observatory of Ocean Networks Canada (ONC). P-ONE aims at addressing key unanswered questions in astrophysics, such as the origin of cosmic rays and the properties of dark matter.

== Book ==
- Gaisser, Thomas K.; Engel, Ralph; Resconi, Elisa (2 June 2016). Cosmic Rays and Particle Physics (2nd ed.). Cambridge University Press. ISBN 978-1-316-59843-6.
