= Terry Wyatt =

British scientist (born 1957)

Terry Wyatt FRS
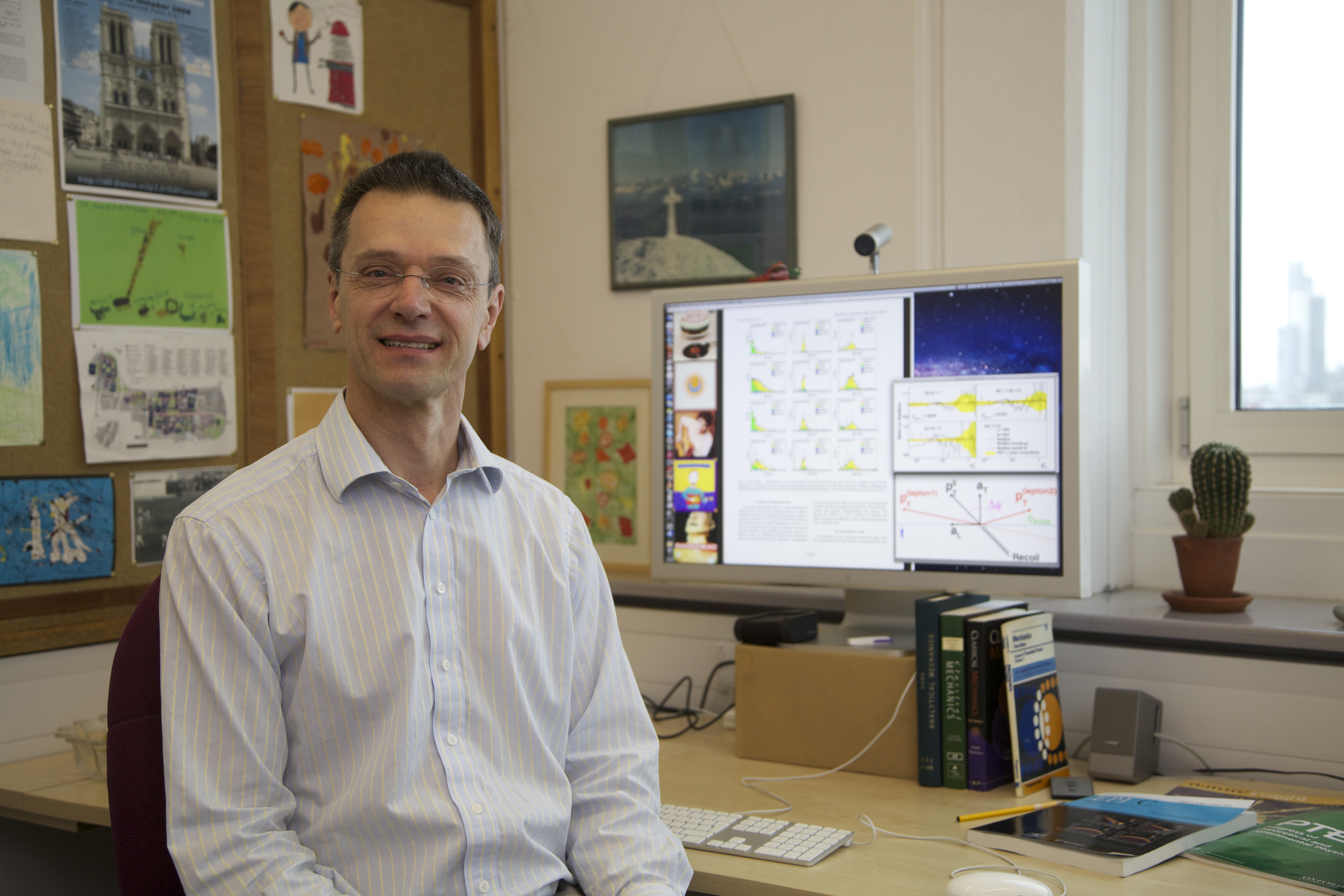
- Terry Wyatt in his office in 2013
- Born: Terence Richard Wyatt; 29 June 1957 (age 69)
- Education: Queen Elizabeth's Grammar School, Tamworth
- Alma mater: Imperial College London (BSc); University of Oxford (DPhil)
- Known for: DØ experiment
- Awards: Chadwick Medal (2011)
- Scientific career
- Fields: Particle physics; Standard model of particle physics; Physics beyond the Standard Model
- Workplaces: University of Manchester; Fermilab; CERN
- Thesis: A study of the production of b quarks in e^{+}e^{−} annihilation at high energies (1983)
- Doctoral advisor: Robin Devenish
- Website: www.hep.man.ac.uk/u/wyatt/

Terence Richard Wyatt (born 29 June 1957) FRS is a Professor in the School of Physics and Astronomy at the University of Manchester, UK.

== Education ==
Wyatt was educated at Queen Elizabeth's Grammar School, Tamworth, Imperial College London (Bachelor of Science) and St Edmund Hall, Oxford where he was awarded a Doctor of Philosophy degree in 1983 for research supervised by Robin Devenish at the University of Oxford.

== Career and research ==
Wyatt's conducts research in particle physics primarily on the DØ experiment at the Tevatron proton-antiproton collider in Fermilab and on the ATLAS experiment at the Large Hadron Collider proton-proton collider in CERN. He was one of three short-listed candidates for the position of CERN Director General in 2014, with Fabiola Gianotti and Frank Linde.

== Awards and honours ==
Wyatt was elected a Fellow of the Royal Society (FRS) in 2013. His certificate of election reads:

Terry Wyatt is an experimental particle physicist who is distinguished for a number of original and important contributions to the experimental verification of the Standard Model (SM). By combining unusual expertise in detector performance with exceptional insight into the topological features of different interaction dynamics, Wyatt has developed and implemented powerful new discriminants of signatures for the production of heavy quarks (b and t) and electroweak bosons (W and Z). His application of these techniques in electron-positron interactions (LEP at CERN) and in antiproton-proton interactions (TeVatron at Fermilab) has resulted in measurements of unprecedented precision. His experimental insight and innovation continue to underpin his work, most notably in his recent leadership as co-spokesperson of the D0 experiment at Fermilab. As new high quality data are taken, he continues to pursue measurements of SM observables with new sensitivity, based on the exploitation of the present luminosity regime at the TeVatron.

Wyatt was also awarded the James Chadwick Medal and Prize from the Institute of Physics (IOP) in 2011.
