= Tony Bell (physicist) =

British physicist (born 1952)

Tony Bell FRS
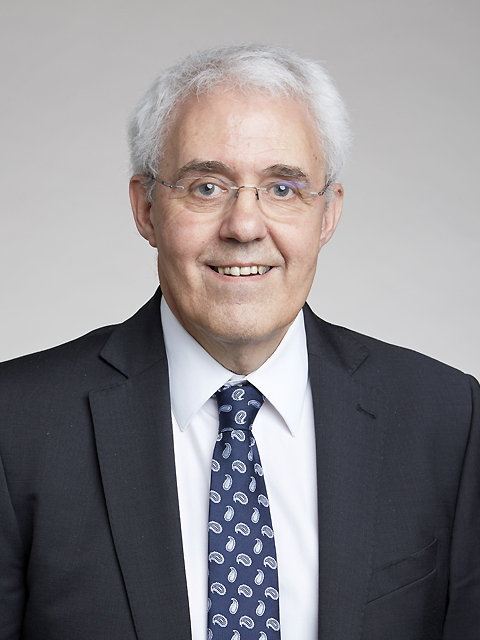
- Bell in 2017
- Born: 9 June 1952 (age 74); Lincoln, England
- Education: Leeds Modern School; Churchill College, Cambridge
- Spouse: Irene Barnett (m. 1975)
- Children: 3
- Awards: Yodh Prize (2021); Fred Hoyle Medal and Prize (2014); Eddington Medal (2016); Hannes Alfvén Prize (2018)
- Scientific career
- Fields: Physics
- Workplaces: University of Oxford; Imperial College London; Marconi Electronic Systems; Central Laser Facility; Methodist Church
- Thesis: Young supernova remnants (1977)
- Website: www2.physics.ox.ac.uk/contacts/people/bellt

Anthony Raymond Bell FRS (born 9 June 1952) is a British physicist. He is a professor of physics at the University of Oxford and the Rutherford Appleton Laboratory. He is a senior research fellow at Somerville College, Oxford.

== Early life and education ==
Anthony Raymond Bell was born on 9 June 1952 in Lincoln, England, to Raymond and Muriel Bell. He was educated at Leeds Modern School and Churchill College, Cambridge, where he studied natural sciences and later gained a PhD in radio astronomy in 1977 for research investigating supernova remnants.

== Career and research ==
Following his PhD, Bell worked on radar signal processing with Marconi Electronic Systems before moving to the Central Laser Facility as a laser-plasma theorist. In 1985 he was appointed a lecturer at Imperial College London, and was appointed professor in 1998. In 2007, following two years with the Methodist Church, he was jointly appointed at the Clarendon Laboratory and the Central Laser Facility.

Bell's research investigates plasma physics. He wrote one of four independent papers proposing the theory of cosmic ray acceleration by shocks. He showed how strong magnetic field is generated during particle acceleration and how it enables cosmic ray acceleration to high energy. He initiated the theory of non-local transport for heat flow in inertial confinement fusion, explained the collimation of laser-produced energetic electrons by resistively generated magnetic field, and with John G. Kirk demonstrated the possibility of electron-positron pair production in ultra-high intensity laser-plasma interactions.

=== Awards and honours ===
Bell was awarded the 2014 Fred Hoyle Medal and Prize of the Institute of Physics "for elucidating the origin and impact of cosmic rays and for his seminal contributions to electron energy transport in laboratory plasmas". In 2016 he was awarded the Eddington Medal of the Royal Astronomical Society for "his development of the theory of the acceleration of charged particles in astrophysics, known as Diffusive Shock Acceleration". He was elected a Fellow of the Royal Society (FRS) in 2017. In 2021 he received the Yodh Prize of the International Union of Pure and Applied Physics (IUPAP). In 2024, Bell was awarded the Royal Society's Rumford Medal.

== Personal life ==
Bell married Irene Barnett in 1975; they have two sons and one daughter. He is a local preacher in the Methodist Church of Great Britain and plays the piano.
