= Cormac Ó Ceallaigh =

Irish physicist

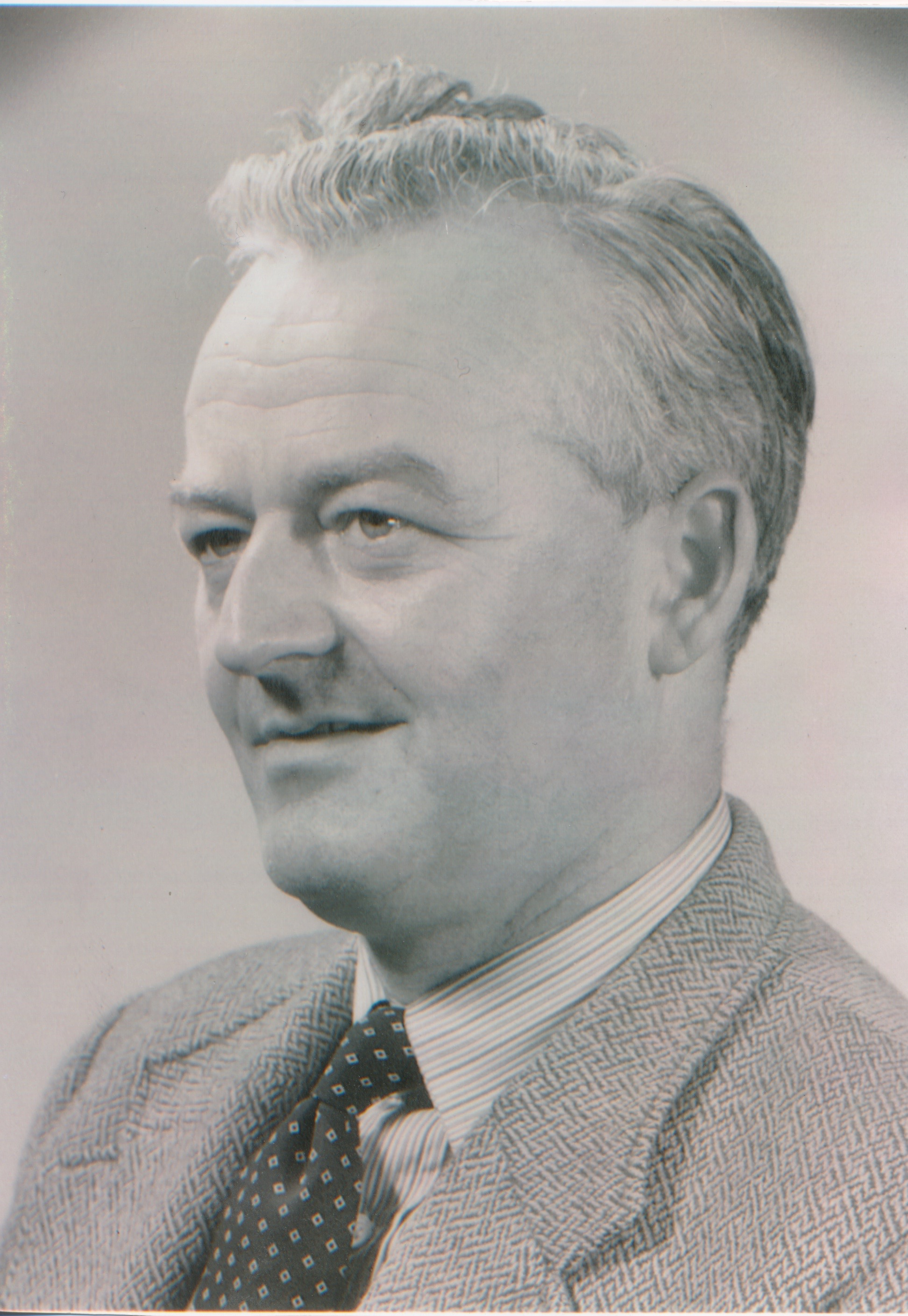
Cormac Ó Ceallaigh

Cormac Ó Ceallaigh (29 July 1912 in Dublin – 10 October 1996 in Dublin) was an Irish physicist who worked in the fields of cosmic ray research and elementary particle physics.

== Education and career ==
Ó Ceallaigh entered University College, Dublin (UCD) to study physics in 1930 and graduated with First Class Honours in Experimental Physics and Chemistry (Inorganic and Physical) in 1933. He got his MSc and an NUI Travelling Studentship in Experimental Physics in 1934 and worked for one year in Paris with the eminent cosmic ray physicist Pierre Auger. From 1935 to 1938 he did postgraduate research at the Cavendish Laboratory, Cambridge, where he was mentored by Lord Rutherford and concentrated on nuclear physics. He got a lectureship at University College Cork in 1937 and returned to Ireland in 1938.

Ó Ceallaigh remained at Cork until 1947, during which time he was conferred with the degree of Ph.D., and then took a position at the University of Bristol working in a group assembled by the Nobel Prize winning particle physicist C F Powell. Bristol was at the time the worldwide centre of cosmic ray research, and O'Ceallaigh, nurtured by Rutherford and Powell, two of the greatest experimental physicists in history, soon became one of its leading figures. Their research into cosmic rays, involving pions, kaons, and neutrinos, helped to establish The Standard Model of particle physics.

The Bristol facility had frequently co-operated with the Dublin Institute for Advanced Studies (DIAS), and in 1953 Ó Ceallaigh became a Senior Professor and Head of the Cosmic Ray Section at that institution. Unlike at Bristol, where the source of the particles he studied was exclusively from cosmic rays, at DIAS he also used man-made particle accelerators. Ó Ceallaigh remained at DIAS for 29 years until his retirement in 1982.

== Personal life ==
Cormac Ó Ceallaigh was born in Dublin in 1912 to prominent obstetrician and early Irish historian Seamus Ó Ceallaigh and his wife Maire Cecilia. He married Millie Carr in 1939; they had three daughters. He was an expert sailer and cabinet maker. He spoke at least five languages. When speaking at conferences, he was known for his sparkling wit.

== Awards and honours ==
In 1936 Ó Ceallaigh was awarded an 1851 Research Fellowship by the Royal Commission for the Exhibition of 1851. In 1951, he became a member of the Royal Irish Academy. He was also a Council Member of the European Physical Society. He was awarded the Boyle Medal in 1979.

In 1999 DIAS and the estate of Cormac Ó Ceallaigh jointly established a medal in his name. The medal recognises scientists who have made important contributions to Cosmic Ray Physics and is presented at the opening ceremony of the biennial International Cosmic Ray Conference.

== Papers ==
- “Masses and modes of decay of heavy mesons.—Part I. κ-particles” The London, Edinburgh, and Dublin Philosophical Magazine and Journal of Science, Series 7, Volume 42, 1951
- "Observations on the multiple scattering of ionizing particles in photographic emulsions.—Part II. The scattering of positrons at 105 and 185 MeV" [with M.G.K. Menon & O. Rochat] The London, Edinburgh, and Dublin Philosophical Magazine and Journal of Science, Series 7, Volume 42, 1951
