= Gaisser–Hillas function =

Function in physics to determine particle density

The Gaisser–Hillas function is used in astroparticle physics. It parameterizes the longitudinal particle density in a cosmic ray air shower. The function was proposed in 1977 by Thomas K. Gaisser and Anthony Michael Hillas.

The number of particles $N(X)$ as a function of traversed atmospheric depth $X$ is expressed as

$$N(X)= N_\text{max}\left(\frac{X-X_0}{X_\text{max}-X_0}\right)^{\frac{X_\text{max}-X_{0}}{\lambda}}\exp\left(\frac{X_\text{max}-X}{\lambda}\right),$$

where $N_\text{max}$ is maximum number of particles observed at depth $X_\text{max}$, and $X_0$ and $\lambda$ are primary mass and energy dependent parameters.

Using substitutions

$n=\frac{N}{N_\text{max}}$, $x=\frac{X-X_0}{\lambda}$ and $m=\frac{X_\text{max}-X_0}{\lambda}$

the function can be written in an alternative one-parametric (m) form as

$$n(x)=\left(\frac{x}{m}\right)^m\exp(m-x)=\frac{x^m \, e^{-x}}{m^m \, e^{-m}}=\exp\left[m\,(\ln x-\ln m)-(x-m)\right]\, .$$
