= Francis Halzen =

Belgian-American particle physicist (born 1944)

Francis Halzen MAE
- Halzen in 2025
- Born: Francis Louis Halzen; 23 March 1944 (age 82); Tienen, Belgium
- Education: Catholic University of Leuven (MSc, PhD)
- Known for: IceCube Neutrino Observatory
- Awards: American Physical Society Fellow (1994); Nobel Prize in Physics (2026)
- Scientific career
- Fields: Particle physics; Neutrino physics
- Workplaces: CERN; University of Wisconsin–Madison
- Thesis: Gebroken symmetrieën van hadronen – dynamica van het π N kanaal (1968)
- Website: icecube.wisc.edu/~halzen

Francis Louis Halzen (born 23 March 1944) is a Belgian-American physicist who has worked in both theoretical and experimental particle physics, including high-energy astrophysics. Born in Belgium, he was educated at the Catholic University of Leuven and worked as a scientific associate at CERN before moving to the United States, where he has been a professor at the University of Wisconsin–Madison since 1972. Since 2001 he has been the principal investigator and co-spokesperson of the IceCube Neutrino Observatory, the world's largest neutrino detector, based at the Amundsen–Scott South Pole Station in Antarctica. He received the 2026 Nobel Prize in Physics "for decisive contributions to the IceCube Neutrino Observatory and the discovery of high-energy neutrinos of astrophysical origin."

== Early life and education ==
Halzen with a replica of Galileo's telescope, 2025

Francis Louis Halzen was born on 23 March 1944 in Tienen, Belgium. He graduated from the Catholic University of Leuven with an MSc Physics degree in 1966, a PhD in 1969. His doctoral dissertation, written in Dutch, was titled Gebroken symmetrieën van hadronen – dynamica van het π N kanaal ("Broken symmetries of hadrons: Dynamics of the π N channel"). Between 1969 and 1971, he worked as a scientific associate at CERN. In 1972, Halzen completed his agrégation de l'enseignement supérieur, which at the time was the habilitation required to advance to senior research and teaching positions in a Belgian university.

== Career ==
In 1972, Halzen was appointed as an assistant professor at the University of Wisconsin–Madison (UW), in the United States. He became a full professor at UW in 1977. Since 1984 he has been director of UW's Institute for Elementary Particle Physics Research. In 1987 he was promoted to the Gregory Breit Distinguished Chair. Halzen's early research was focused on theoretical particle physics and nuclear physics. With British theoretical physicist Alan Martin, Halzen co-authored Quarks and Leptons: An Introductory Course in Modern Particle Physics (1984), which soon became a standard textbook in particle physics.

Halzen also became a leading researcher in cosmic ray physics and astroparticle physics. He has published many papers on cosmic ray anomalies and quark matter, on relations between particle physics and cosmic rays, on particles from supernovae, and on muon production in atmospheric gamma-ray showers.

Halzen was appointed Vilas Research Professor in 2021. As of October 2026 he retains this position, as well as continuing in the roles of director of the Institute for Elementary Particle Physics Research and Gregory Breit Distinguished Professor.

=== AMANDA ===
Halzen first learned about attempts by Russian scientists to detect neutrinos in Antarctica, using radio antennas at their Antarctic research station to search for electric sparks resulting from cosmic neutrinos colliding with the ice. After determining these interactions would be too weak to register, in 1987 he started working on the AMANDA project, which proposed burying an array of light sensors deep in the Antarctic ice which is clear, dark, stable, sterile and free of background light. That design was based on an idea by Soviet physicist Moisey Markov, originally proposed in 1960 but never implemented, to look for high-energy neutrinos by putting Cherenkov detectors into Lake Baikal.

This pilot AMANDA experiment was able to detect high-energy cosmic muons and neutrinos, but its measurements were affected by interference from cosmic rays, as well as by air bubbles in the ice. These factors convinced Halzen that a much larger and deeper array would be needed, and in 2005 the AMANDA project became part of its successor project, the IceCube Neutrino Observatory.

=== IceCube Neutrino Observatory ===
IceCube Neutrino Observatory at the South Pole

In 2005, his team began construction of the IceCube project, designed to be 100 times larger than AMANDA, with a total volume of 1 km^{3} (0.24 cu mi) and buried up to 2,400 metres (7,900 ft) deep. After six years of construction, IceCube became fully operational in 2011. The most important result from IceCube was the clear breakthrough observation of high-energy neutrinos (about 100 times more energetic than the particles accelerated today at the world's most powerful machine, the LHC at CERN) in 2013, from as-yet-unidentified sources outside the galaxy. This discovery has stimulated the planning and development of even larger neutrino telescopes, both at the South Pole and deep underwater.

=== Other roles ===
Halzen has served on various advisory committees, including those for the SNO, Telescope Array and Auger-upgrade experiments, the Max Planck Institutes in Heidelberg and Munich, the ICRR at the University of Tokyo in 1983 and 1987, the US Particle Physics Prioritization Panel and the ApPEC particle astrophysics advisory panel in Europe.

== Honours and awards ==
In 1994, Halzen became fellow of the American Physical Society and elected to National Academy of Sciences in 2024. He has received many awards, including:

- 2013: Breakthrough of the Year Award by the journal Physics World for the first-time discovery of cosmic neutrinos beyond the Milky Way
- 2015: Balzan Prize
- 2015: Giuseppe and Vanna Cocconi Prize of the European Physical Society "for his visionary and leading role in the detection of very high-energy extraterrestrial neutrinos, opening a new observational window on the Universe."
- 2018: Bruno Pontecorvo Prize for significant contribution to the IceCube detector construction and experimental discovery of high-energy astrophysical neutrinos.
- 2019: Yodh Prize of IUPAP for "his leadership and landmark contributions cleared a path for the emergence of neutrino astronomy."
- 2021: Homi Bhabha Medal and Prize of IUPAP and TIFR
- 2026: APS Medal for Exceptional Achievement in Research
- 2026: Nobel Prize in Physics "for decisive contributions to the IceCube Neutrino Observatory and the discovery of high-energy neutrinos of astrophysical origin"

In 2005, the U.S. Advisory Committee on Antarctic Names named the Halzen Mesa (within the Insel Range in Victoria Land, Antarctica) after Francis Halzen.

=== Nobel Prize in Physics ===
In 2026, Halzen was awarded the Nobel Prize in Physics "for decisive contributions to the IceCube Neutrino Observatory and the discovery of high-energy neutrinos of astrophysical origin." In announcing the award, the Royal Swedish Academy of Sciences credited Halzen's scientific leadership in developing IceCube as an instrument for neutrino astronomy. It explained that high-energy neutrinos can point us to distant astrophysical particle accelerators, because neutrinos travel over cosmic distances without changing direction or losing energy.
