= Richard Lingenfelter =

American astrophysicist and historian (1934–2021)

- Born: April 5, 1934; Farmington, New Mexico
- Died: March 20, 2021 (aged 86)
- Education: University of California, Los Angeles (BA)
- Occupations: Astrophysicist and historian
- Employer(s): Lawrence Livermore National Laboratory; University of California, Los Angeles; University of California, San Diego
- Organization(s): American Physical Society; American Geophysical Union; Western History Association; American Astronomical Society; International Astronomical Union
- Known for: Work on cosmic rays, gamma rays, and the history of Death Valley
- Awards: Fulbright Scholarship

Richard Emery "Rich" Lingenfelter (April 5, 1934 – March 20, 2021) was an American astrophysicist and historian. He is known for his work on the origin of cosmic rays and gamma rays. As a historian, he is recognized for his efforts at chronicling the history of Death Valley.

== Biography ==
Lingenfelter was born on April 5, 1934, in Farmington, New Mexico. He received his bachelor's degree from the University of California, Los Angeles (UCLA) in 1956. He then worked at Lawrence Livermore National Laboratory from 1957 to 1962, after which he worked at UCLA's Institute of Geophysics from 1962 to 1968. From 1969 to 1979, he was a professor in residence at UCLA's Institute of Geophysics and Planetary Physics, and in their Department of History. He was concurrently a faculty member in UCLA's Department of Astronomy from 1974 to 1979. In 1979, he joined the faculty of the University of California, San Diego (UCSD) as a research physicist, theoretician and senior lecturer. After his retirement he remained at UCSD as a research physicist emeritus at UCSD's Center for Astrophysics and Space Sciences.

== Honors and awards ==
Lingenfelter received a Fulbright Scholarship to serve as a visiting fellow at the Tata Institute of Fundamental Research from 1968 to 1969. He was a fellow of the American Physical Society and the former chair of its Division of Astrophysics. His other professional memberships included the American Geophysical Union, the American Astronomical Society, the International Astronomical Union, and the Western History Association.
