= International Cosmic Ray Conference =

Biannual physics conference

The International Cosmic Ray Conference, or ICRC, is a physics conference organized biennially by the Commission C4 (Astroparticle Physics) of the International Union of Pure and Applied Physics (IUPAP) since 1947, where physicists from the whole world present the results of their research in Astroparticle Physics. The main topics of Astroparticle Physics are

- Cosmic Ray Physics,
- Gamma-Ray Astronomy,
- Neutrino Astronomy,
- Dark Matter Physics,
- Multi-Messenger Astrophysics,
- Solar and Heliospheric Physics,
- Astroparticle Physics Theory and Models,
- Experimental Methods, Techniques and Instrumentation and
- Outreach & Education in Astroparticle Physics.

As part of the opening ceremonies, The O'Ceallaigh Medal is presented to a researcher who has made distinguished contributions to Cosmic Ray Physics. Also, the Yodh Prize and the Bhabha Medal and Prize are awarded to senior members of the community.

For young researchers, the Shakti Duggal Award and two IUPAP Young Scientist Awards are presented at each ICRCs.

Proceedings are published for each conference. Some are, partially or in full, available online (see external links). The NASA's Astrophysics Data System (ADS) has started to gather these proceedings and publish them online on the ADS webserver.

== List of ICRCs ==
- 41st ICRC : 2029, Jinan, China
- 40th ICRC : 2027, Buenos Aires, Argentina (webpage)
- 39th ICRC : July 15–24, 2025, Geneva, Switzerland (webpage)
- 38th ICRC : July 26 – August 3, 2023, Nagoya, Japan (webpage)
- 37th ICRC : July 12–23, 2021, Berlin, online conference, Germany (webpage)
- 36th ICRC : July 25 – August 1, 2019, Madison, United States (webpage)
- 35th ICRC : July 12–20, 2017, Busan, South Korea (webpage)
- 34th ICRC : July 30 – August 6, 2015, The Hague, Netherlands (webpage)
- 33rd ICRC : July 2–9, 2013, Rio de Janeiro, Brazil (webpage)
- 32nd ICRC : August 11–18, 2011, Beijing, China (webpage)
- 31st ICRC : July 7–15, 2009, Łódź, Poland (webpage)
- 30th ICRC : July 3–11, 2007, Mérida, Mexico (webpage)
- 29th ICRC : August 3–10, 2005, Pune, India (webpage)
- 28th ICRC : July 31 – August 7, 2003 Tsukuba, Japan (webpage)
- 27th ICRC : August 8–15, 2001, Hamburg, Germany (webpage)
- 26th ICRC : 1999, Salt Lake City, United States
- 25th ICRC : 1997, Durban, South Africa
- 24th ICRC : 28 August – 8 September 1995, Rome, Italy (webpage)
- 23rd ICRC : 1993, Calgary, Canada
- 22nd ICRC : 1991, Dublin, Ireland
- 21st ICRC : 1990, Adelaide, Australia
- 20th ICRC : 1987, Moscow, USSR
- 19th ICRC : 1985, La Jolla, United States
- 18th ICRC : 1983, Bangalore, India
- 17th ICRC : 1981, Paris, France
- 16th ICRC : 1979, Kyoto, Japan
- 15th ICRC : 1977, Plovdiv, Bulgaria
- 14th ICRC : 1975, Munich, West Germany
- 13th ICRC : 1973, Denver, United States
- 12th ICRC : 1971, Hobart, Australia
- 11th ICRC : 1969, Budapest, Hungary
- 10th ICRC : 1967, Calgary, Canada
- 9th ICRC : 1965, London, United Kingdom
- 8th ICRC : 1963, Jaipur, India
- 7th ICRC : 1961, Kyoto, Japan
- 6th ICRC : 1959, Moscow, USSR
- 5th ICRC : 1957, Varenna, Italy
- 4th ICRC : 1955, Guanajuato, Mexico
- 3rd ICRC : 1953, Bagnères-de-Bigorre, France
- 2nd ICRC : 1949, Como, Italy
- 1st ICRC : 1947, Kraków, Poland
