= Project GRAND =

Cosmic ray observatory at the University of Notre Dame

Project GRAND ("Gamma Ray Astrophysics at Notre Dame")
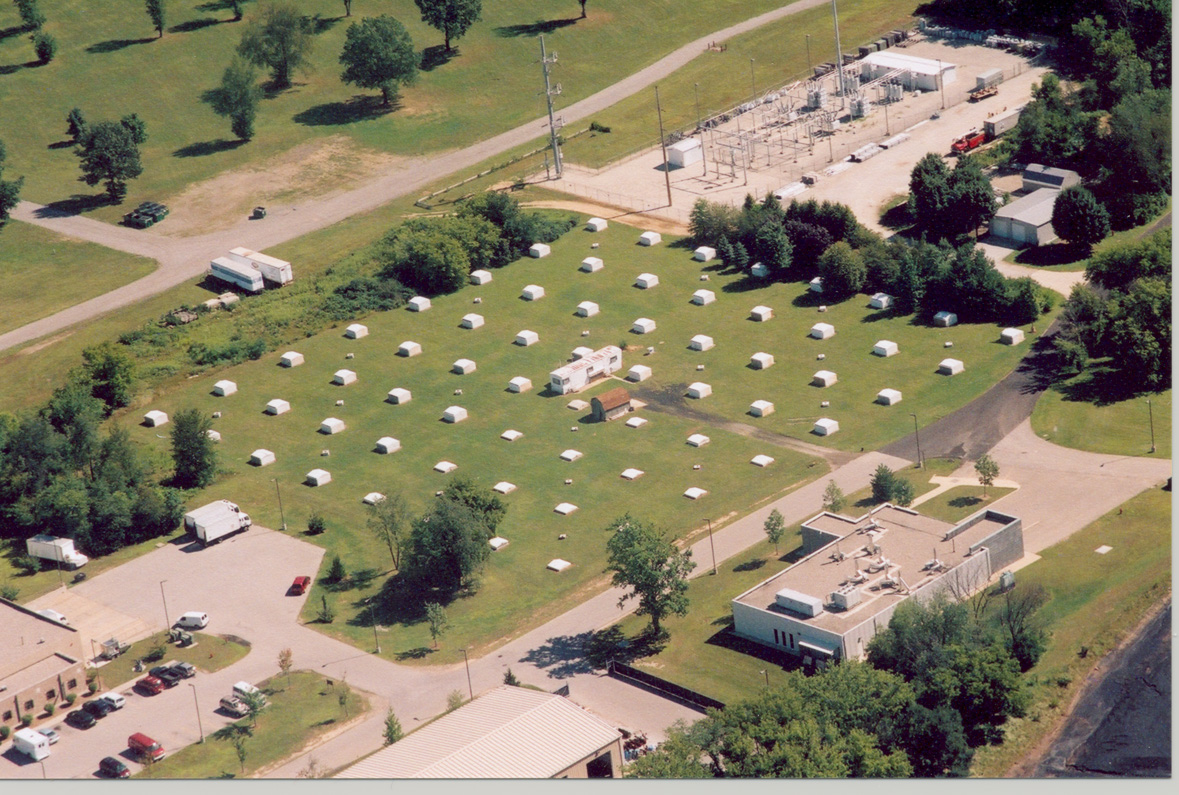
- Project GRAND, 2004
- Location: University of Notre Dame, Notre Dame, IN
- Coordinates: 41°42′41″N 86°14′20″W
- Organization: Notre Dame Department of Physics and Astronomy, National Science Foundation
- Altitude: 220 m
- Built: 1987–1996
- Diameter: 64, 1.29 m^{2} proportional wire chambers
- Angular resolution: 0.25°
- Collecting area: 83 m^{2}
- Website: https://www3.nd.edu/~grand/
- Location within the United States

Project GRAND is a cosmic ray observatory located on the University of Notre Dame campus. The observatory features a grid of sixty-four proportional wire chamber (PWC) particle detectors positioned within a 10,000 m^{2} field. Project GRAND was designed and built by Notre Dame professor emeritus John Poirier and his students. The observatory operated mainly between 1989 and 2011. Project GRAND detected cosmic rays from the sun and extrasolar sources. Project GRAND was also able to discern the effect of atmospheric temperature and pressure on cosmic ray surface counts.

== Concept and features ==
Cosmic rays were discovered in 1912 by Austrian physicist Victor F. Hess for which he won the 1936 Nobel Prize in physics. Cosmic rays are particles, mostly protons, that are emitted by the sun and extrasolar sources. These particles impact earth's atmosphere to produce showers of particles ("extensive air showers" or EAS) that can be detected from the surface. In 1983, German physicists Wilhelm Stamm and Manfred Samorski were able to link cosmic rays to a source in space named Cygnus X-3 (the third brightest x-ray emitting object in the constellation Cygnus). Cygnus X-3 emits two major types of particles: protons and gamma ray photons. The gamma rays fall within two categories, "very high energy" (10^{12} eV) and "ultra high energy" (10^{15} eV). Of these categories, ultra high energy gamma rays can be observed using ground based cosmic ray detectors.

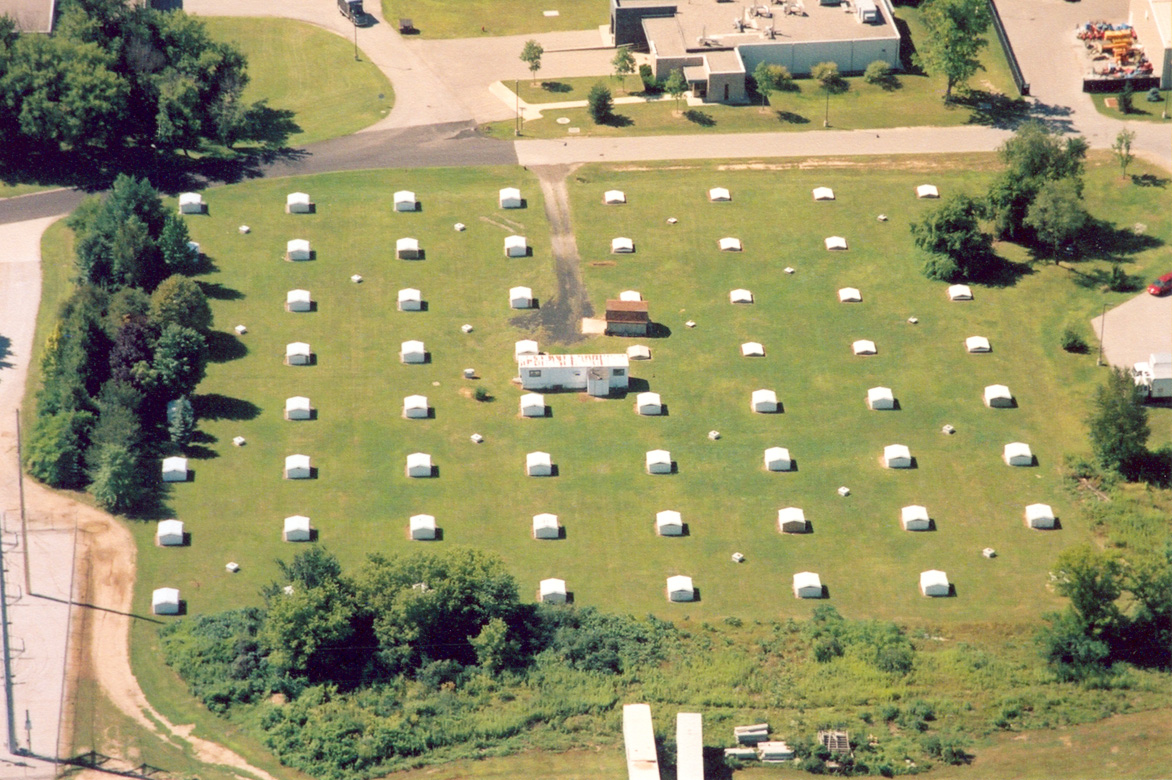
View from the north of Project GRAND, 2004, Calvin Swartzendruber.

Professor emeritus John Poirier of the University of Notre Dame founded Project GRAND in the late 1980s. Poirier obtained his PhD in particle physics from Stanford University, and he later performed research at the Serpukhov accelerator in Russia and at Fermilab near Chicago. Poirier joined the Notre Dame Department of Physics faculty in 1964. Poirier later pursued the study of cosmic rays and their sources in space. He initially made plans to build a conventional optical detector that would be placed in a northern Indiana soybean field, but a leading expert in scintillation detector technology from Krakow, Poland then visiting the Notre Dame campus convinced Poirier to pursue a different approach, one that wouldn't be dependent upon weather conditions. Poirier employed Monte Carlo simulations to design a scintillator-based cosmic ray observatory that would detect extensive air showers produced by ultra high energy gamma rays and protons. The observatory, named Project GRAND, would be able to pinpoint the sources of cosmic ray particles to an angular resolution of 0.25° (an apparent angle of half the size of a full moon). Poirier presented this plan in a 1987 paper for the 20th International Cosmic Ray Conference held in Moscow. GRAND is an acronym for "Gamma Ray Astrophysics at Notre Dame". The observatory would be built with the assistance of the National Science Foundation (NSF) as well as funds from the University of Notre Dame and private individuals. Newspaper articles about Poirier and Project GRAND were published in the January 9 and November 19, 1989, editions of the South Bend Tribune.

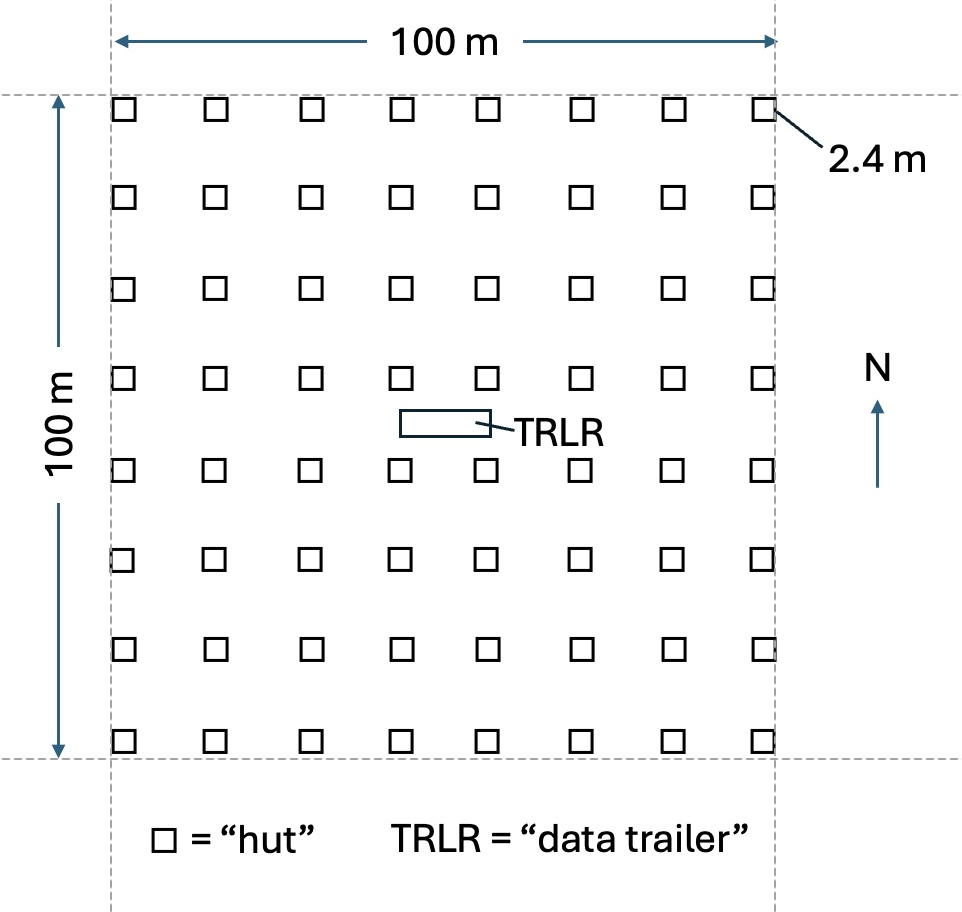
Project GRAND schematic.

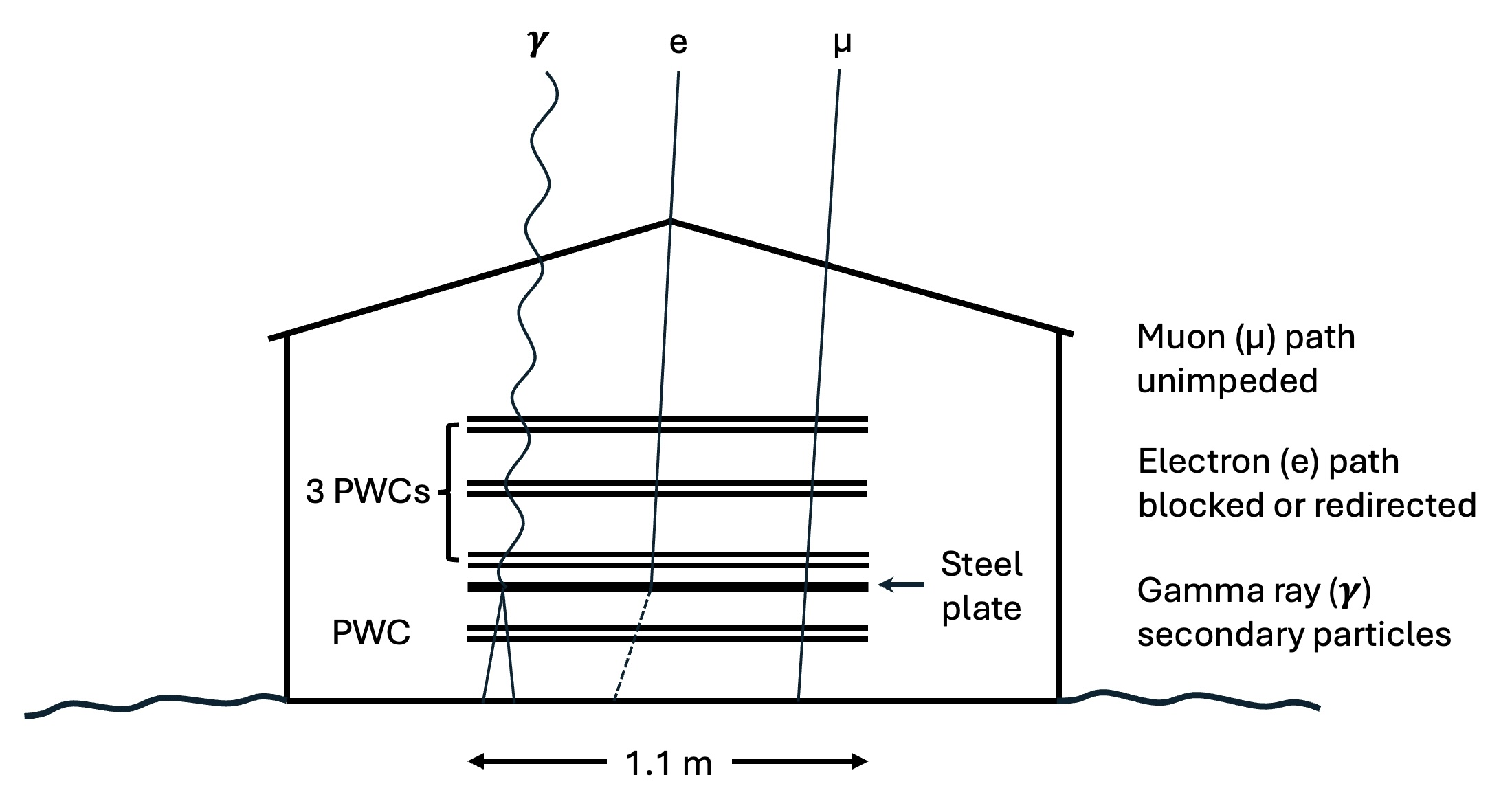
Project GRAND wooden "hut" schematic. Each hut features 4 proportional wire chambers (each containing two sets of tungsten wires) to detect cosmic rays.

In its heyday, Project GRAND used a set of 64 cosmic ray detecting installations that were located on a level field north of the Notre Dame main campus. Each of the 64 installations employed a set of eight vertically stacked proportional wire chambers (PWCs). (George Charpak won a 1992 Nobel Prize in physics for inventing the PWC.) At Project GRAND, each PWC chamber features 160 orthogonally positioned tungsten wires (two sets of 80 wires) sealed within an atmosphere consisting of argon and carbon dioxide (80% and 20% respectively). Cosmic ray "hits" were registered by the detection of ionized gases as voltage differences in the tungsten wires. The 64 installations, termed "huts", are plywood buildings arrayed in an 8 by 8 grid covering an area of 10,000 m^{2} (a 100 m by 100 m field). The grid is oriented directly north to south and, along with the stacked PWCs, allowed estimation of the angles of entry of cosmic ray induced particles.

Extensive air showers display a cone of particles that impact earth's surface in an approximate 200 m diameter circular area. At Project GRAND, near simultaneous detections within multiple huts established the occurrences of an extensive air showers. A steel plate positioned above the bottom PWC in each hut was used to detect muons. Muons are heavy, short-lived cousins of the electron that are generated in earth's atmosphere by the impact of cosmic rays. The steel plate also allowed discrimination between air showers generated by gamma ray photons and those generated by protons, and the detection of muons enabled the differentiation of these sources of air showers. According to Poirier, in his proposal for the experiment, background protons would be reduced to zero by the detection of muons, and the detection of muons could then be linked to extended air showers produced by ultrahigh energy gamma rays.

Each of the 64 huts was connected to a central trailer where data from the experiment was accumulated. The data trailer had been obtained from NASA surplus and may have been used as a quarantine facility for Mercury and Gemini mission astronauts.

== Discoveries, educational opportunities ==
The Project GRAND experiment operated between 1989 and 2011. As stated, the observatory received funds from the National Science Foundation. After construction, the main expense of the experiment was the purchase of the argon gas used in the PWCs.

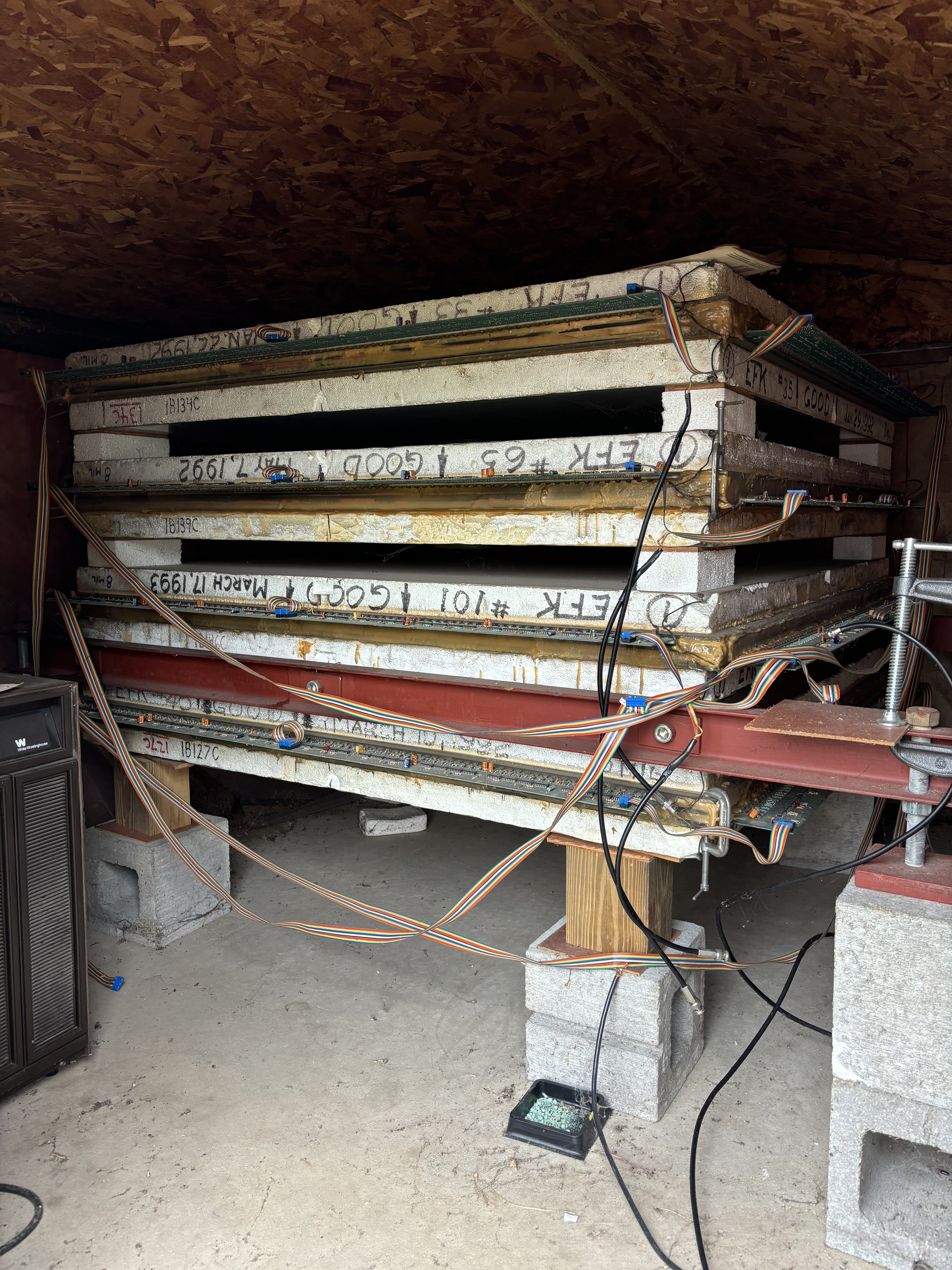
Interior view of a Project GRAND hut. 4 proportional wire chambers are featured (each containing two sets of tungsten wires). The red component supports a 5 cm thick steel plate used to distinguish muons from electrons.

At the 28th International Cosmic Ray Conference held in Tsubuka, Japan in 2003, Professor Poirier presented results suggesting that Project GRAND may have been able to detect excess muons from cosmic ray bursts visible from the observatory. Poirier used data from the BATSE experiment that was part of the NASA's Compton Gamma Ray Observatory. In particular, he demonstrated that a 2.7σ statistical significance was obtained for the detection of muons at Project GRAND from gamma ray burst GRB 971110.

Results of Project GRAND observations of two solar flares were reported at the 30th International Cosmic Ray Conference held in Mérida, Mexico in 2007. On April 15, 2001, an X14 solar flare erupted on the sun and Project GRAND was able to detect excess muons from this event at a statistical level of 6.1σ. Project GRAND also detected excess muons with a confidence of 9.9σ from an X7.1 solar flare that occurred on January 20, 2005. Another phenomenon related to solar flares, the Forbush decrease, was also observed using Project GRAND data. A Forbush decrease is a temporary lowering of the detectable flux of extrasolar cosmic rays due to the magnetic interference of a solar coronal mass ejection (CME). A decrease in extrasolar cosmic ray flux was detected at Project GRAND after the September 11, 2005, CME and reported at the Mérida conference.

An earlier Forbush decrease had been observed after the CME of October 28, 2003. According to Christopher D'Andrea's PhD thesis, the muon flux dropped by 8% after the October 29 CME and a change of direction in associated cosmic ray particles was observed. This change of direction may have been linked to the interaction of earth's magnetic field with that of the CME.

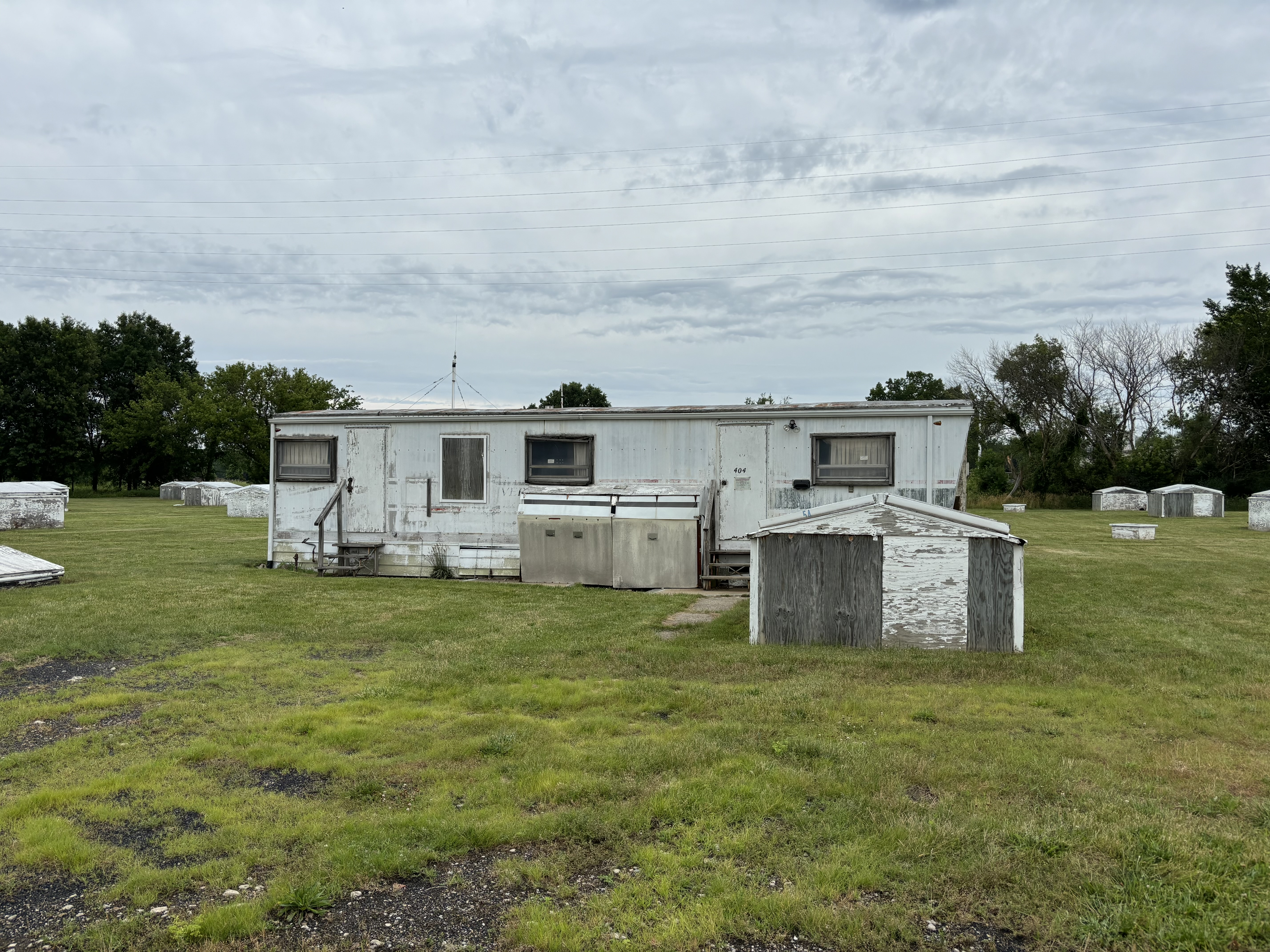
Project GRAND NASA surplus data trailer, July 2024.

At the 32nd International Cosmic Ray Conference held in Beijing in 2011, Professor Poirier was able to demonstrate a relationship between muon flux and atmospheric temperature and pressure using data from Project GRAND. The experiment had been detecting muons since 1995, and the entire array collected muons at a rate of approximately 2,000 per second. Poirier found that higher atmospheric pressures caused a decrease in muon detections. He also determined that higher temperatures likewise produce lower rates of muon detection in the experiment. At this same conference, Poirier unveiled the results of a 117-day run of muon detections at the observatory in 2007. Muon fluxes throughout a 24-hour period differed and exhibited daily highs and lows. A longer-term variation over the entire observing period was also observed with a high flux of muons occurring in October 2008. Poirier attributed this seasonal flux to the location of earth within the solar system's magnetic field (interplanetary magnetic field, IMF).

Graduate students as well as undergraduate and high school teachers and students have performed research and maintenance of the Project GRAND experiment. Using Project GRAND data under the aegis of Dr. Poirier, Younan Lu earned a PhD in 1991 and Christopher D'Andrea earned a PhD in 2006. In 2007 it was reported that six Notre Dame undergraduate students had performed research at Project GRAND and wrote three theses. During summers, undergraduate students from other universities have participated in Project GRAND through Notre Dame's Research Experiences for Undergraduates (REU) program. In 2004, Cornell REU student David Levitan updated the experiment's Fortran code to C. Levitan went on to earn a PhD in astrophysics from Caltech and is now a data scientist for Microsoft. Local high school teachers and students have also worked at Project GRAND through Notre Dame's research experiences for high school students (REHS) and Research Experiences for Teachers (RET) programs administered by the QuarkNet Center at the University of Notre Dame. According to QuarkNet National Staff Teacher Ken Cecire, "the project serves as a valuable outreach tool for high school students and teachers to study astrophysics."

== See also (Wikipedia) ==
- Notre Dame QuarkNet Center
- Cosmic Ray Observatory
- Project GRAND panorama
- International Cosmic Ray Conference
