= Notre Dame QuarkNet Center =

Research program at the University of Notre Dame

Coordinates: 41°42′34″N 86°14′14″W

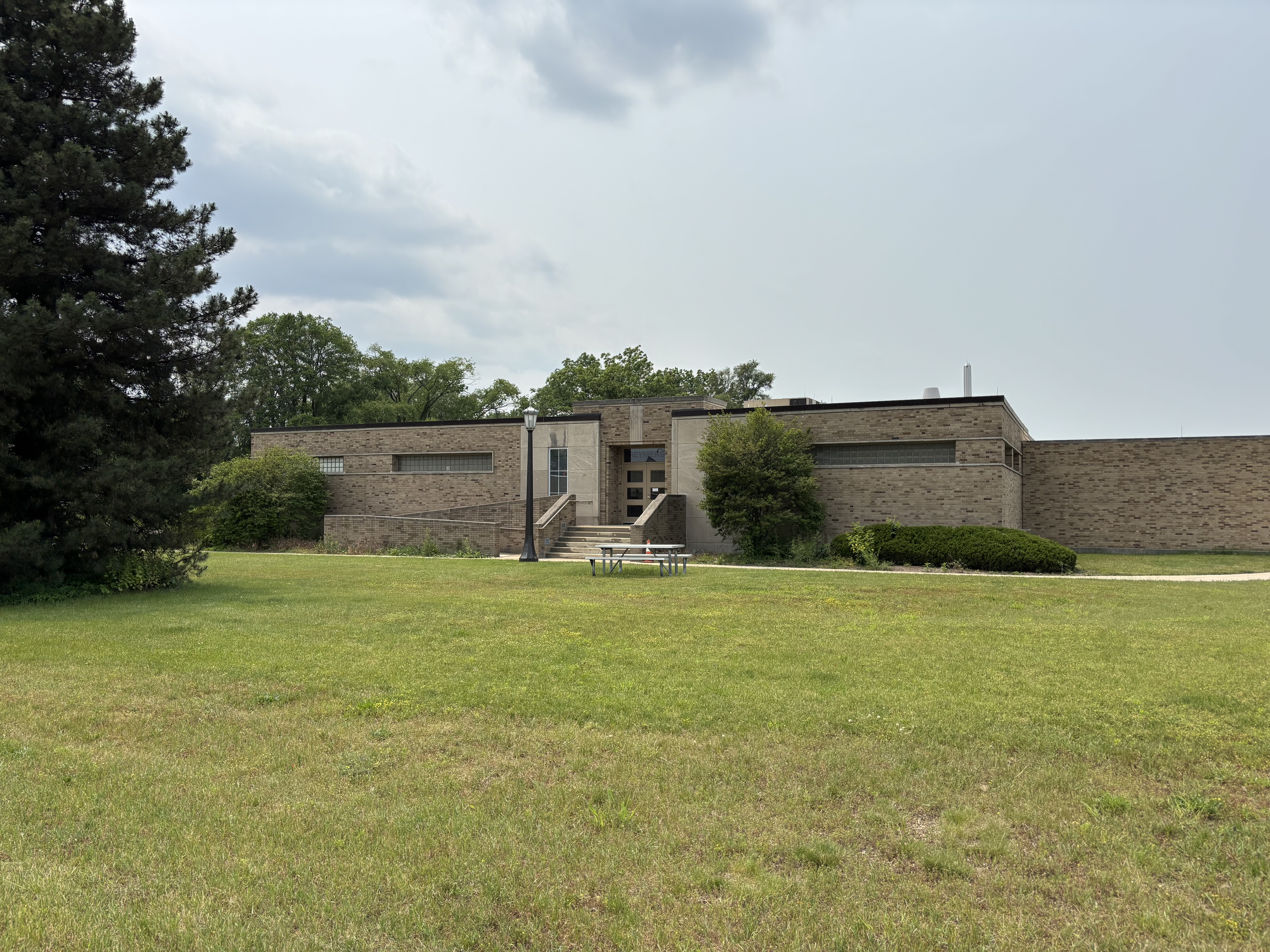
- Reyniers Life Building, University of Notre Dame
- Established: 1999, 2019 (Reyniers)
- Laboratory type: Physics
- Directors: Kenneth Cecire, Antonio Delgado (mentor), Patrick Mooney, Randal Ruchti (founding), Mitchell Wayne
- Staff: Joel Griffith, Jeff Marchant, Mike McKenna, Dan Ruggiero, Mark Vigneault, Anne Zakas
- Location: 19121 Moreau Dr., Notre Dame, Indiana, 46556
- Campus: University of Notre Dame
- Website: physics.nd.edu/research/quarknet/

The Notre Dame QuarkNet Center at the University of Notre Dame was established in 1999. QuarkNet is a nation-wide program that pairs university faculty with high school teachers and students to perform summer research related to physics, astronomy, chemistry, and biology. Along with Notre Dame, QuarkNet centers are sponsored by dozens of other universities. The Notre Dame QuarkNet Center is regarded as a flagship center for the program. The program was started by particle physicists associated with Fermilab in Illinois and CERN in Switzerland and has been sponsored by the National Science Foundation (NSF) and the United States Department of Energy (DoE).

In July, 2026, a letter was sent to QuarkNet teachers asking them to contact their elected representatives in the U.S. House of Representatives and the U.S. Senate and ask them to support the reinstatement of funding for the national QuarkNet program. Funding for the program ended in August 2026.

== 1997 to early 2000s ==
=== Randal Ruchti and Patrick Mooney ===
In 1997, professor Randal Ruchti of the University of Notre Dame began efforts to teach particle physics to local high school students in the South Bend, Indiana community. In particular, he wanted to link students to experiments being conducted at Fermi National Accelerator Laboratory in Illinois and the Large Hadron Collider (LHC) in Switzerland. Ruchti had also been selected as a United States educator coordinator for the LHC. Ruchti engaged young people with demonstrations at the annual Science Alive event hosted by the South Bend Public Library. Ruchti approached a former Physics graduate student, Patrick Mooney of the Trinity School at Greenlawn, about starting science outreach at Trinity and eventually the greater community. Ruchti and Mooney had worked on the D-Zero project that discovered the top quark at Fermilab in 1995. Mooney stated "We want to see if we can forge some cooperative effort that will fit into the high school's program". These early efforts of Ruchti and Mooney would eventually find fruition in the national QuarkNet program.

=== SSC ===
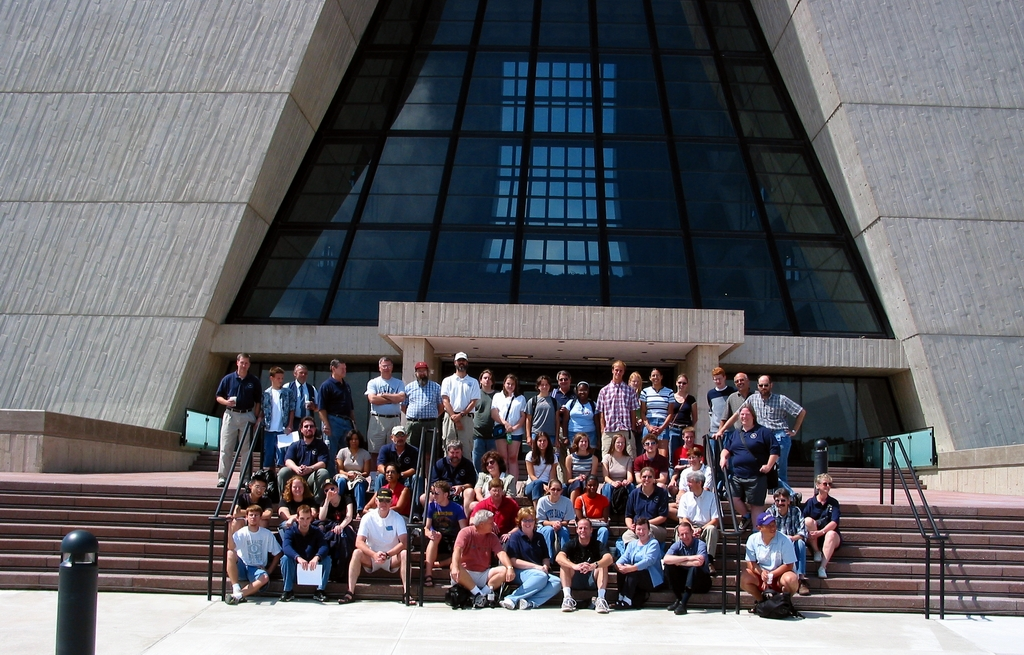
QuarkNet Fermilab field trip, summer 2002, Wilson Hall. Top row (standing), numbers indicate position from left: Tom Loughran (1), Dale Wiand (5), Tom Guthrie (6), Kevin Johnston (11), Dan Karmgard (19). Second row from top: Helene Dauerty (11, standing). Third row from top: Mark Vinneault (11). Fourth row from top: Lynda Rose (5), Pat Mooney (8).

Another factor involved with the establishment of QuarkNet was the demise of the Superconducting Super Collider (SSC), an American particle accelerator that had been planned for Texas. The U. S. Congress canceled funding for the project five years before the establishment of QuarkNet. Ruchti was concerned that a major impetus for particle physics research and education was leaving the United States. He believed that a program like QuarkNet could serve to fill the vacuum left by the departure of the center of the particle physics universe from the United States to CERN in Switzerland.

=== National QuarkNet program ===
The national QuarkNet program was established by Keith Baker of Hampton University, Marge Bardeen of Fermilab, Michael Barnett of Lawrence Berkeley National Laboratory, and Randal Ruchti of the University of Notre Dame in 1998. QuarkNet was started as a network of particle physicists and high school students and educators with the goal of providing hands-on experience in particle physics research. Ruchti established the Notre Dame QuarkNet Center at the University of Notre Dame in 1999 as one of 25 sites in the United States that were part of the nascent QuarkNet program. Ruchti would later assume leadership positions within the University of Notre Dame in 2008 and the National Science Foundation in 2011.

=== N. Eddy St. Lab ===
At Notre Dame, two local South Bend, Indiana Adams High School students, David Dickerson and Daniel Saddawi-Konefka, were recruited in the summer of 1999 by professor Ruchti to build components for the Large Hadron Collider (LHC) experiment being constructed at CERN in Switzerland. Two local high school teachers, LeRoy Castle of LaPorte High School and Dale Wiand of Adams High School, also joined to work with Ruchti and the students. The team set up a laboratory in an abandoned Aldi grocery store on N. Eddy Street adjacent to the University of Notre Dame campus. The students began work on 500 calorimeters to be used in the LHC. The devices employed strands of fiber optic scintillating material that would detect light from collisions in the experiment. This project established the annual summer employment for area high school students and educators at the Notre Dame QuarkNet Center.

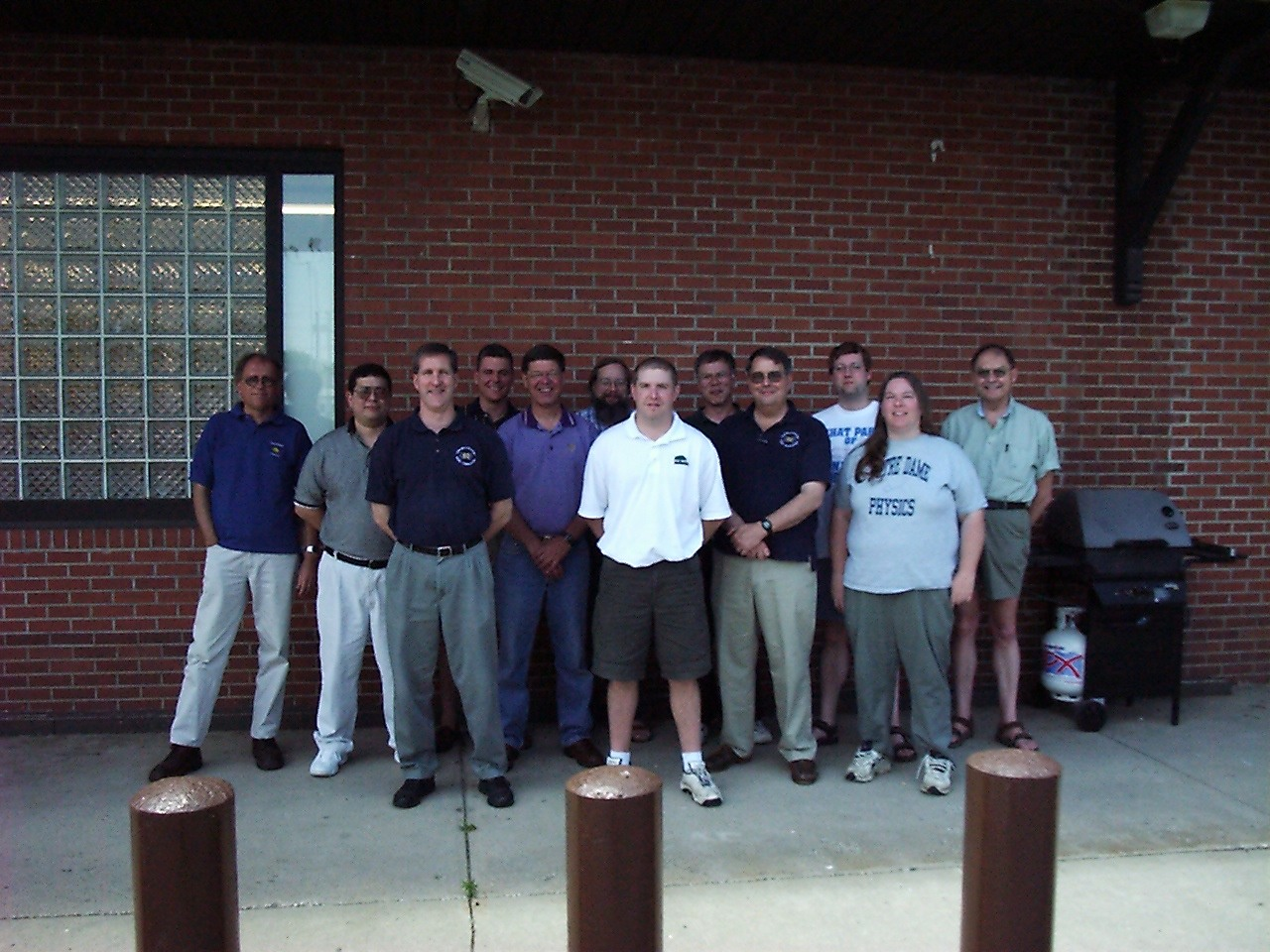
Notre Dame QuarkNet Center teachers and mentors, N. Eddy St. Lab, summer 2002. Numbered from left, Randal Ruchti (1), LeRoy Castle (2), Tom Loughran (3), Jeff Chorny (4), Gerald Van Laecke (5), Tom Guthrie (6), Ed Fidler (7), Dale Wiand (8), Kevin Johnston (9), Ken Andert (10), Helene Dauerty (11), James Bishop (12).

=== D-Zero waveguides ===
During the summer of 2000, the Notre Dame QuarkNet Center would employ students Michael Busk of Trinity School at Greenlawn, Zach Clark of Jimtown High School, and Jenny Tristano of LaLumiere High School. Recruited by local science teachers, the students worked on fiber optic waveguides to be installed in the D-Zero experiment at Fermilab in Illinois. The waveguides were to be incorporated into D-Zero's Central Fiber Tracker in order to carry light signals derived from the emergence of high energy particles from the collisions of protons and antiprotons in the experiment. These collisions were conducted inside the ring-shaped Tevatron particle accelerator. At this time in the early 21st century, researchers were focused on obtaining evidence for the long sought Higgs boson particle which was later detected at CERN in 2012. Physics education was also included in the student's experience. During lunches, physicist Dan Karmgard of Notre Dame provided instruction on topics such as cosmic rays from space. The students also visited Fermilab to learn about the D-Zero detector and modern particle physics.

=== Fermilab Summer 2000 Training Session ===
QuarkNet staff member Patrick Mooney of the Trinity School at Greenlawn was one of the organizers of a Summer 2000 teacher training session at Fermilab. Mooney had been a researcher with the D-Zero experiment and had obtained his Ph.D. in physics from Notre Dame in 1986. 24 high school teachers participated in the Fermilab experience. Training session organizer Ken Cecire of Hampton University had recruited one of the teachers for the summer workshop. Cecire was also a QuarkNet national staff member. He had studied physics at the City College of New York and had worked previously as a high school teacher.

=== Tom Loughran ===
Tom Loughran of the University of Notre Dame participated in a summer 2000 Research Experience for Teachers (RET) experience at the Notre Dame QuarkNet Center under the guidance of professor Ruchti. Loughran had obtained a Ph.D. in philosophy from Notre Dame in 1986. Loughran would go on to work in various aspects and offshoots of the Notre Dame QuarkNet Center and Fermilab such as the I2U2 education program, Michiana BioEYES, and the Notre Dame Extended Research Community (NDeRC).

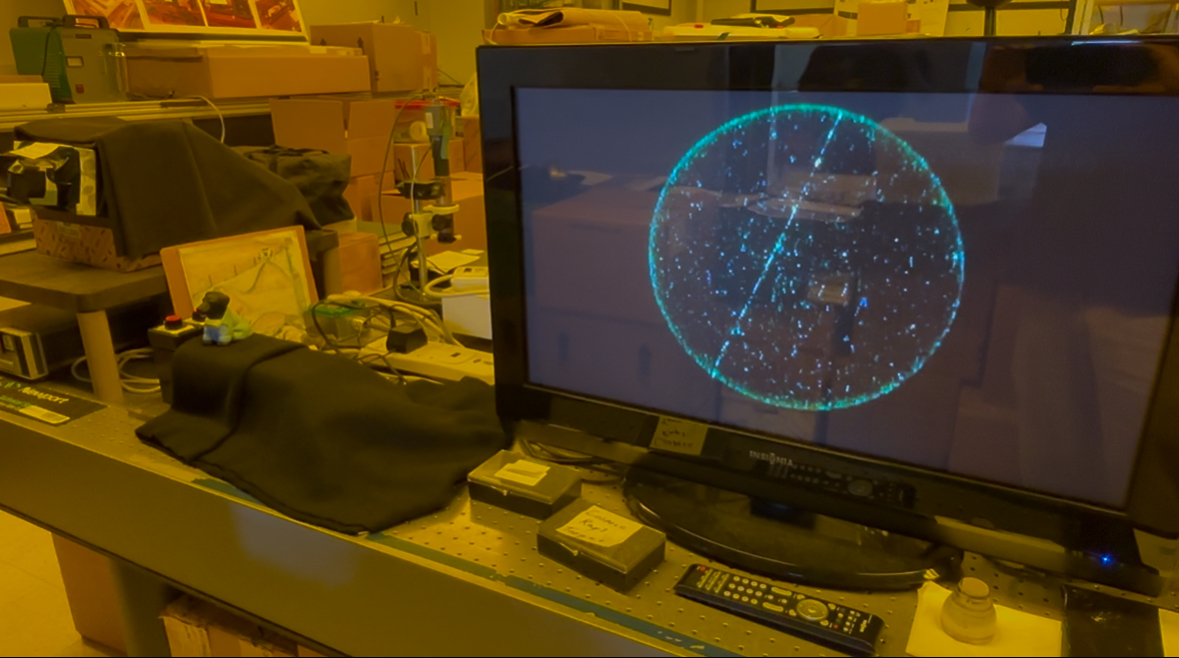
Notre Dame QuarkNet Center cosmic ray detector built by Randal Ruchti. Note the path of a cosmic ray visible on the monitor screen.

=== Smithsonian cosmic rays ===
In the Summer of 2001, Randal Ruchti and Barry Baumbaugh of Notre Dame installed a cosmic ray detector in a permanent display at the National Air and Space Museum in Washington, DC. The detector was included in the "Explore the Universe" exhibit that highlighted instruments built by astronomers and scientists. Ruchti and Baumbaugh's detector was the only live functioning device in the exhibit and utilized a night vision scope to project live views of cosmic ray particle tracks on a screen. The night vision scope detected faint pulses of light generated when high energy particles pass through a bundle of special fiber optic material in the device. The building of cosmic ray detectors would become one of the major summer projects for QuarkNet students.

=== NSF funding ===
In 2002, the National Science Foundation approved $3.67 million in funding to continue the QuarkNet program for the next five years with the goal of eventually hosting 60 university based centers similar to the center at Notre Dame. According to professor Ruchti, one of the students from the 2001 program, Amy DeCelles of Trinity School at Greenlawn, had been instrumental in convincing the NSF review panel in Washington D.C. to approve the new funding. The Notre Dame QuarkNet Center was now staffed full time by Beth Marchant (Beiersdorf) who had been a physics teacher at LaSalle High School and had participated as an RET teacher in 2000. Marchant would direct the Notre Dame QuarkNet Center from 2001 to 2009. Dale Wiand of Adams High School and LeRoy Castle of LaPorte High School continued their involvement with the Notre Dame QuarkNet Center. Wiand had accomplished an RET experience at the Notre Dame QuarkNet Center in 2000 and Castle had finished his RET at Notre Dame in 2002.

=== Student growth ===
A news feature in the journal Nature provided an overview of the QuarkNet program and Randal Ruchti's establishment of the Notre Dame QuarkNet Center. The article stressed the ability of QuarkNet teachers to introduce current physics topics within their classrooms. It also mentioned the growth experienced by students in the program who were enabled to ask "probing questions" during their subsequent high school science classes.

== Mid to late 2000s ==
=== ODUs ===
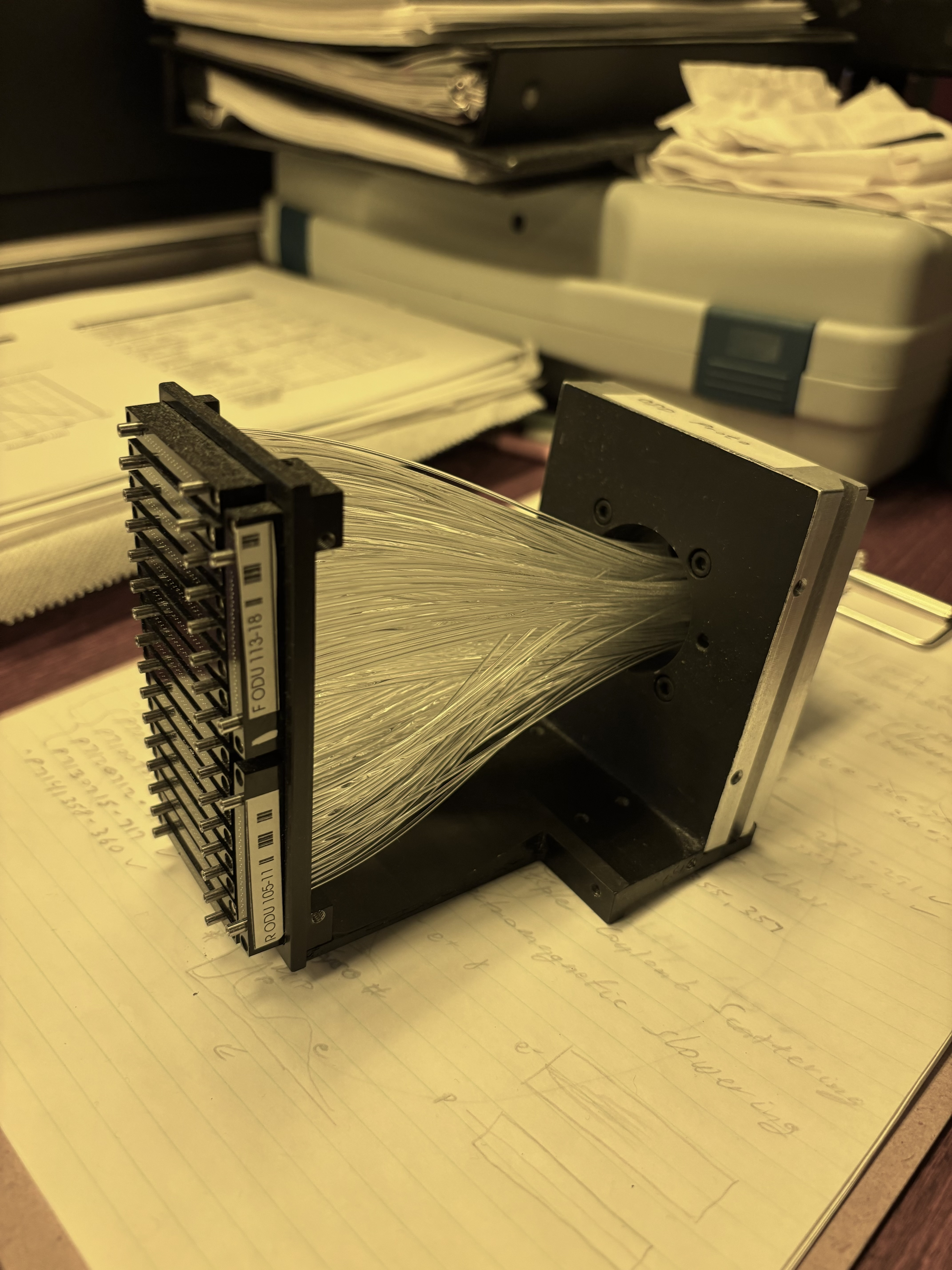
Notre Dame QuarkNet ODU, originally built by high school students for the Large Hadron Collider (LHC) in Switzerland.

Two students from Lakeshore High School in Stevensville, Michigan, Elliott Mallen and Erin McCamish, were profiled in a newspaper article published in July 2002. The students build devices known as ODUs that would be installed in the Large Hadron Collider at Geneva, Switzerland. The ODUs featured 250 optical fibers and cost approximately $5,000 to make. According to the article, the students had to attend lunch lectures given by professors and guest speakers. As a final project, the students had to deliver a presentation on a particle physics subject. Mallen and McCamish had been recruited by Notre Dame QuarkNet teacher Jeff Chorny of Lakeshore High School and obtained $7.85 per hour of work along with three college credits from Notre Dame.

=== GRID data team ===
During the summers of 2003 and 2004, the GRID data team at the Notre Dame QuarkNet Center worked to create a web page to provide access to test beam data from the Large Hadron Collider (LHC) in Switzerland. The web page would allow students to access and analyze this data and to store their results. In particular, the proton beam from CERN would be tested for purity, and the detectors would be tested for anomalies. The group traveled to Fermilab to learn the analysis of calorimeter data for beam purity. The data was analyzed with a free analysis program named ROOT, which allowed the students to graph data for analysis. The large amount of data required distributed computers located at Fermilab, Argonne National Laboratory, the University of Chicago, and Notre Dame. This team was led by Notre Dame QuarkNet staff members Daniel Karmgard, Tom Loughran, and Patrick Mooney along with Lynda Rose of Penn High School. The group employed two students each summer. A summary of this project was published in the Mathematics Teacher for May 2005.

=== Notre Dame science outreach ===
The Research Experience for Teachers at Notre Dame (RET@ND) program at Notre Dame was highlighted in an article in ND Works, a news journal catering to the university. The RET@ND program drew applications from local science and mathematics teachers to perform summer research on the campus. During the previous summer, three-dozen area high school teachers were employed. The article stressed the example of the Notre Dame QuarkNet Center as a model of success. According to the article, the Notre Dame QuarkNet Center had engaged dozens of physics teachers and students in two months of all-day research in high energy physics. Other Notre Dame efforts were mentioned such as those of the electrical engineering department, the Joint Institute for Nuclear Physics (JINA), the graduate program for the history and philosophy of science, and a teacher education program for elementary and middle schools sponsored by nearby Saint Mary's College. This later program had been funded by a three-year grand from the Indiana Department of Education.

=== Siemens Competition ===
In 2006, junior students Mengwen Zhang (Penn High School) and Kristen Anderson (Bremen High School) were selected as finalists for the Siemens Competition for scientific research held at the Massachusetts Institute of Technology (MIT). The students had presented their QuarkNet summer research project named "Performance of Scintillating and Waveshifting Fibers for Particle Detectors". The research was related to the particle accelerator at CERN. Both students were introduced to the QuarkNet program by their high school science teachers. Anderson and Zhang performed their research project under the direction of QuarkNet staff members Dan Karmgard and Mark Vigneault. Anderson obtained a bachelor's degree from MIT and now works in the aerospace industry. Zhang was the Penn High School co-valedictorian and later obtained her Ph.D. in chemical engineering from UC Santa Barbara and works as a patent engineer.

=== CRiL ===
In 2007, Marian High School junior Tony Coiro and LaLumier High School junior Caleb Phillps worked at the Notre Dame QuarkNet Center under the direction of Dan Karmgard, Jeff Chorny, Danielle McDermott, then an Arkansas high school physics teacher, research technician Mike McKenna, and physicist Barry Baumbaugh of Notre Dame. Their project was to build a table-top cosmic ray detector to be installed as a demo at the CERN visitor center. The device, termed the CRiL, consisted of pairs of scintillating tiles mounted in a horizontal, rotating structure. Meant to be interactive, the CRiL is controlled with a touch screen. Users can place their hands between the horizontal detectors and note that it has no effect on the passage of cosmic ray particles. The group traveled to CERN in 2008 to install the demo. Coiro went on to study physics at Purdue University. He made national news by building a solar powered motorcycle that could also be charged with regular household current. Coiro along with other electric vehicle enthusiasts also started the Purdue Electric Vehicles Club. Coiro now works in the aerospace industry. Danielle McDermott later obtained a Ph.D. from Notre Dame and obtained an appointment with the Los Alamos National Laboratory. Barry Baumbaugh had joined the Notre Dame High Energy Physics Group in 1978 and had worked with professor Ruchti at Fermilab and CERN. Baumbaugh was also deeply involved in the Notre Dame QuarkNet Center. According to Notre Dame professor Mitch Wayne, Baumbaugh had helped a wide range of people from university faculty and graduate students to area high school students and educators.

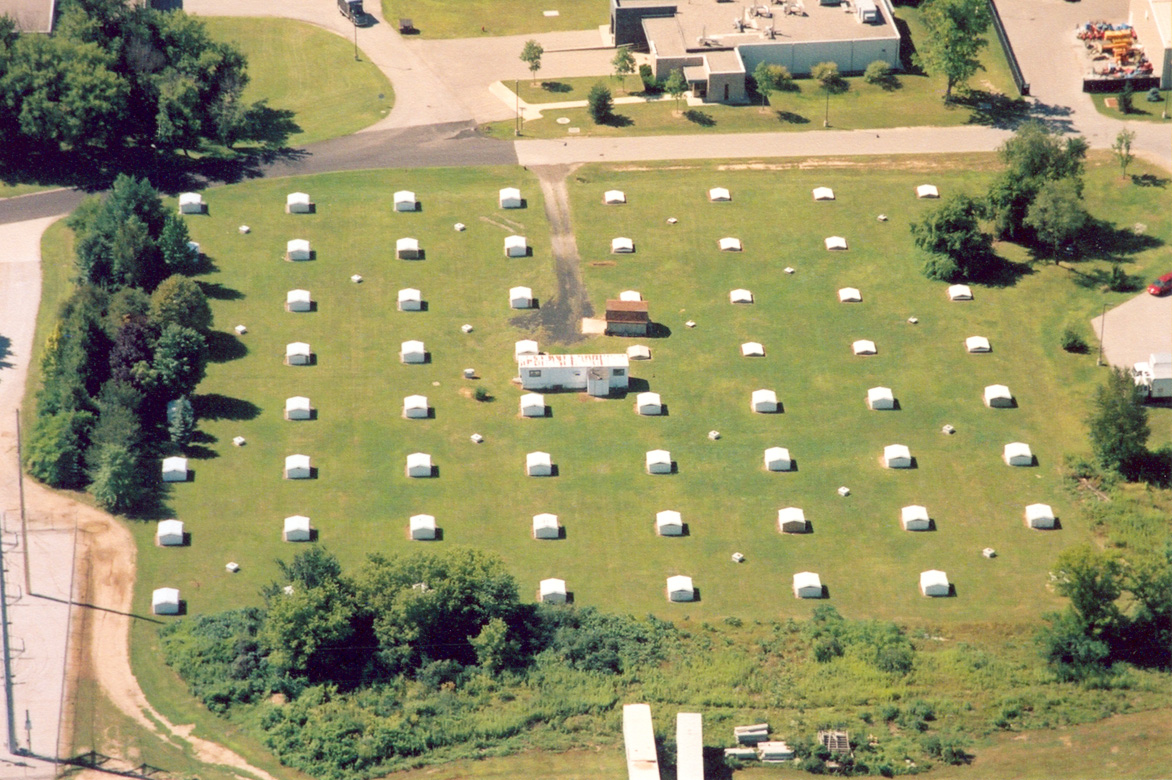
Project GRAND, University of Notre Dame cosmic ray experiment.

=== Project GRAND ===
In the late 1980s, professor John Poirier of the University of Notre Dame started construction of Project GRAND, a cosmic ray detector array located on the Notre Dame campus. The detector consisted of 64 huts arrayed in a 10,000 m^{2} grid pattern. Within each hut was an array of stacked proportional wire chambers that were able to measure the energy and direction angles of muons generated by the impact of cosmic rays with molecules of gas in the atmosphere. Poirier and his students used Project GRAND to study various phenomena related to the sun and space weather. Project GRAND was later utilized as a summer project for Notre Dame undergraduate students along with area high school faculty and students. Local teachers Ed Fidler and Calvin Schwartzendruber performed research under the aegis of the Notre Dame QuarkNet Center. Goals of the Project GRAND summer project were outreach and enrichment of potential science students.

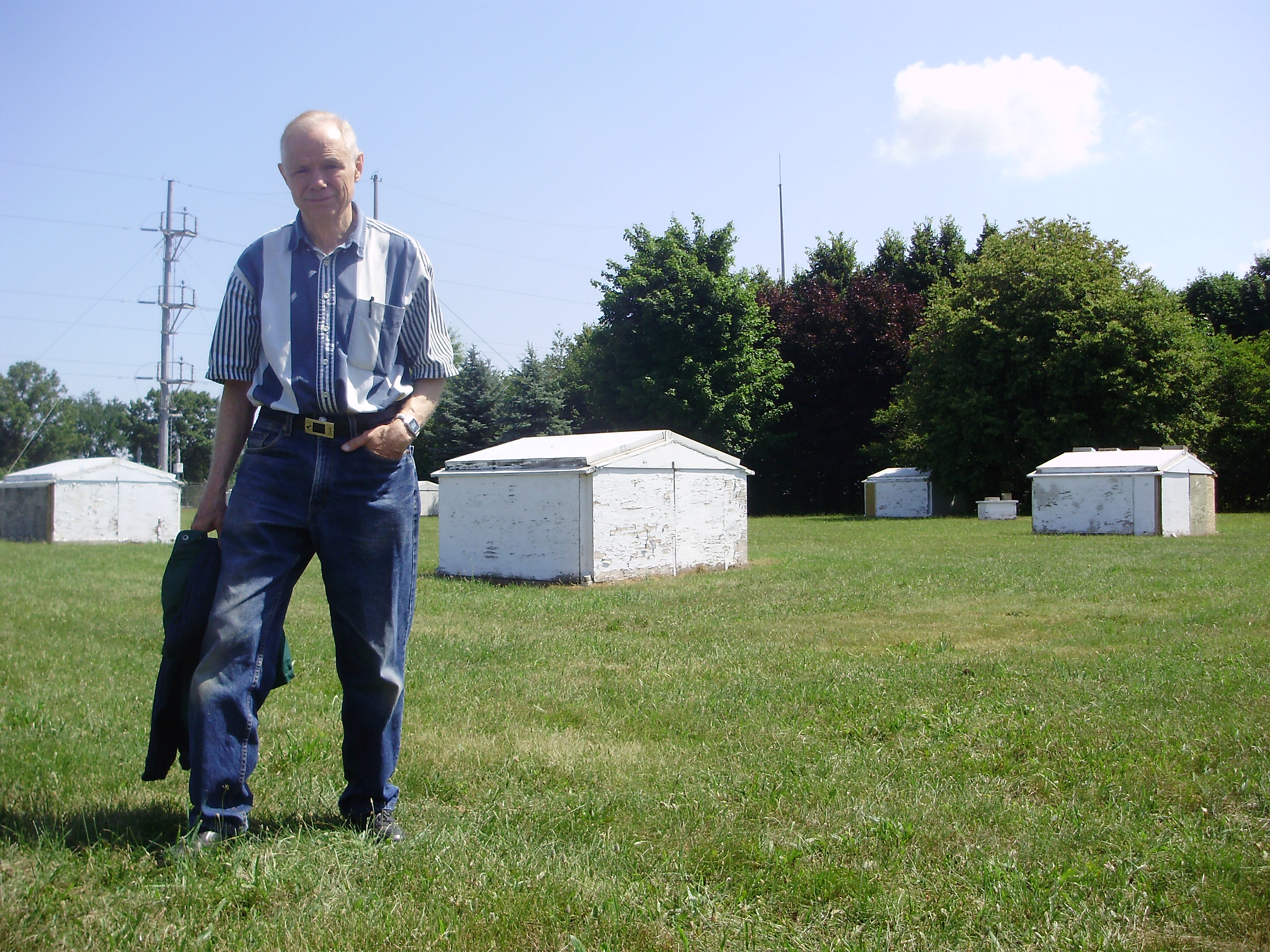
Notre Dame professor John Poirier was a physicist out standing in his field. Poirier was the founder of the Project GRAND cosmic ray experiment.

=== NDeRC ===
In 2007, the University of Notre Dame secured a grant for $2.71 million from the National Science Foundation to support 37 graduate students who worked as "ambassadors for science" in local secondary school classrooms. The program was named the Notre Dame extended Research Community (NDeRC). The grant, referred to as an "NSF Graduate Teaching Fellows in K-12 Education Award" was secured due to the efforts of Tom Loughran and other teachers active in the Notre Dame QuarkNet Center. According to Loughran, the grant would enable graduate students to contribute to local science, technology, and engineering (STEM) education while providing broad preparation for their later careers. The graduate students were paired with QuarkNet teachers in Lakeshore High School in Stevensville, Michigan and Indiana high schools in LaPorte, Bremen, and Elkhart. The graduate students also participated in the QuarkNet summer research projects of their respective teachers. The projects were linked to Notre Dame research in astronomy, biology, chemistry, computer science, physics, and robotics. Loughran also emphasized that QuarkNet and NDeRC would work with Notre Dame's Robinson Community Learning Center, which had shared an adjacent wing of the building housing the Notre Dame QuarkNet Center. The Robinson Center provides programs and resources for the South Bend community. The graduate students would be able to contribute to programs offered by the Robinson Center. Starting in 2007, NDeRC also sponsored a series of annual forums named "Collaborating for Education and Research Forum" (ND Forum) that were held on the Notre Dame campus. The events provided opportunities for local school teachers and administrators to interact with university faculty and graduate students along with representatives from local business and government. An exhibit hall allowed local science and education organizations to showcase exhibits and the work they perform for the community. Indiana representative, and later senator, Joe Donnelly spoke at the 2011 ND Forum.

=== I2U2 ===
In 2008, Tom Loughran was selected as Education Program Leader for the Interactions in Understanding the Universe (I2U2) program. This NSF-funded effort had been established by Marge Bardeen of Fermilab. Within I2U2, Loughran would spearhead the continuing development of e-Labs which had been used by other QuarkNet teachers nationally. Work on e-Labs became part of the summer research performed at the Notre Dame QuarkNet Center. The e-Labs were designed as a free resource that would link data and researchers from academic settings to high school educators and students. The e-Labs drew on work in cosmic rays, observations from the Compact Muon Solenoid (CMS) experiment within the LHC, and data from the LIGO gravitational wave experiment. In 2009, Loughran sponsored a Notre Dame workshop for local teachers to showcase the new LIGO e-Lab. Physics teacher Mark Kirzeder of Marian High School stated that "It's going to be a neat application." Kirzeder would go on to become a QuarkNet teacher in 2010. He had taught mathematics at Mishawaka Marian High School since 2005 and would be appointed principal of the school in 2014.

=== ILC ===
In 2009, a group of Notre Dame faculty and local high school teachers and students developed a project to build muon tracking devices for the planned International Linear Collider (ILC) particle accelerator. According to Notre Dame professor Mitch Wayne, the Notre Dame high energy physics personnel had a long history of working with the calorimetry of scintillating fibers and made a natural fit to develop muon tracking devices for the proposed collider. The university was also part of the Muon Detector Group, an association of around 30 international and provincial universities and research facilities. The annual QuarkNet program was utilized to recruit students to work on building the muon tracking devices. Wayne expressed his view that local students would enjoy a unique learning experience and foster their interest in high energy physics.

== 2010s ==
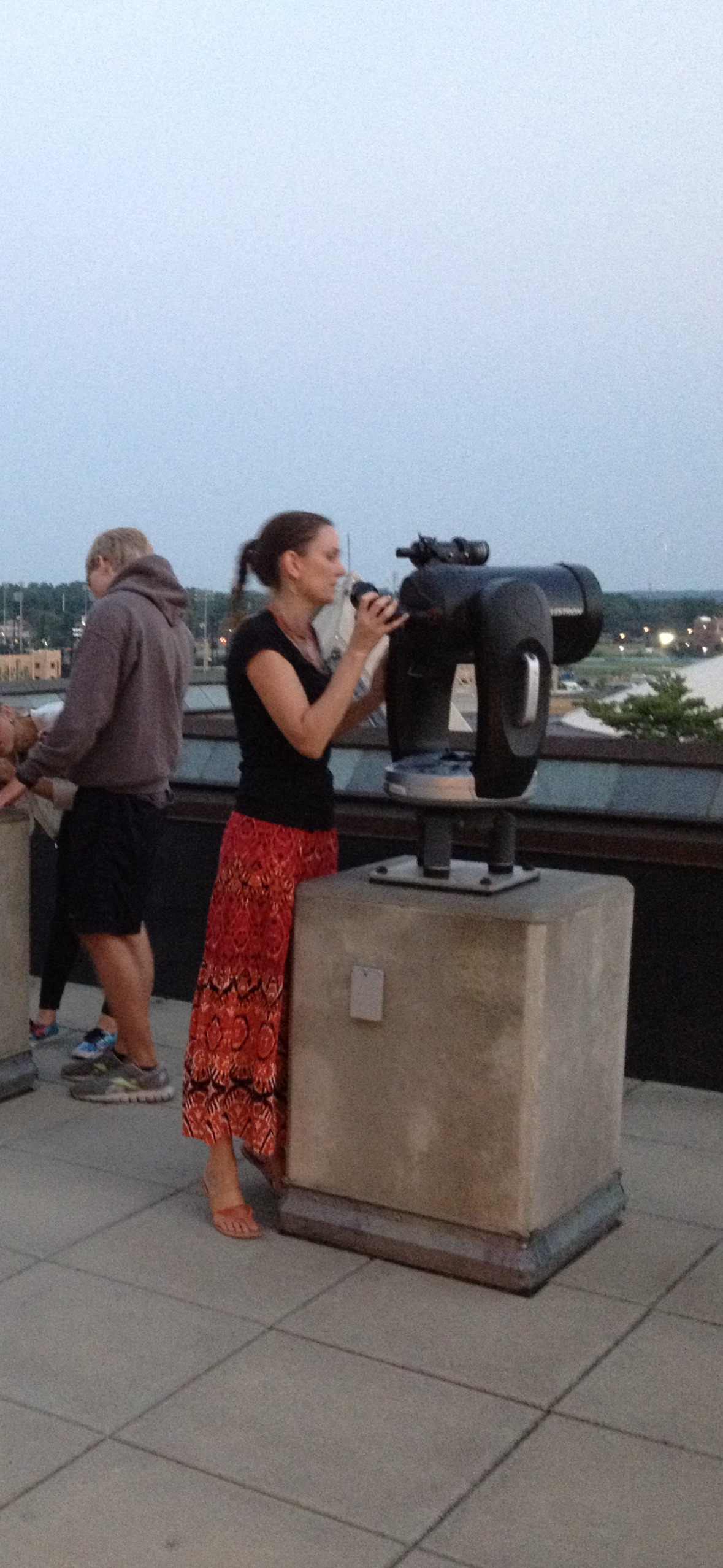
QuarkNet teacher Carolyn Fletcher, July 2014, Notre Dame Jordan Hall of Science.

=== Mitch Wayne ===
Around 2004, Randal Ruchti handed off the QuarkNet principal investigator duties to Notre Dame professor Mitch Wayne. Wayne had worked with the QuarkNet program for much of its existence and was instrumental in obtaining funds from the National Science Foundation and the Department of Energy. He has also worked with Ken Cecire to build and promote the physics Masterclasses offered by QuarkNet and CERN. These masterclasses allow high school students to work with real data from the CMS experiment at CERN and to build cosmic ray detectors.

=== Particle physics masterclasses ===
In March 2010, a QuarkNet international masterclass was held at the Notre Dame's Robinson Community Learning Center. Students form St. Joseph High School under the tutelage of Notre Dame QuarkNet teacher Tom Loughran attended the event. The St. Joseph students interacted via videoconference with students at the University of Vienna and University of Cincinnati along with moderators at Fermilab. The students collaborated on data from the Electron-Positron Collider (LEP), the predecessor of the Large Hadron Collider (LHC) at CERN, Switzerland. According to Dan Karmgard of Notre Dame, the results would be statistically combined with the results from other students around the world.

In March 2015, a particle physics masterclass was conducted at the Notre Dame QuarkNet center for Adams High School physics students under the supervision of QuarkNet teacher Dan Walsh. The students analyzed Higgs boson data from the Large Hadron Collider (LHC). Later in the week, the students participated in a video simulcast along with some international students. As mentioned in the March 22, 2015, edition of the South Bend Tribune, other area students, teachers, and Notre Dame faculty have participated in masterclasses and summer sessions offered by the Notre Dame QuarkNet Center.

=== Five-year funding ===
In 2012, it was reported that the University of Notre Dame received $6 million to support the QuarkNet particle physics program. The funding would provide for five years of operation. QuarkNet funding operates on a five-year schedule. In 2018, Mitch Wayne was able to secure $4.25 million in funds from the National Science Foundation to continue the operation of 52 QuarkNet centers across the United States. Professor Wayne also obtained three years of funding in 2023.

=== Notre Dame DVT ===
In 2013, Ken Andert of LaLumiere High School attended the Live Interactive Planetarium Symposium held at Seminole State College in Sandford, Florida. Andert started work as a QuarkNet teacher in 1999 and has worked with astronomy professor Keith Davis of Notre Dame in the university's Digital Visualization Theater (DVT) at the Jordan Hall of Science. The DVT is a 136-seat, 50-foot-domed planetarium theatre. The Notre Dame QuarkNet DVT group was established in 2008. Along with Ken Andert and Keith Davis, other participants include Ed Fidler of New Buffalo High School and Notre Dame QuarkNet staff member Jeff Marchant. Andert and Davis teach summer QuarkNet students the foundations of 3D animation by using professional modeling and rendering software. Along with LaLumiere students, Andert and Davis created a 3D simulation of particle collisions from the Compact Muon Solenoid (CMS) experiment at the Large Hadron Collider (LHC) in Geneva, Switzerland. The simulation was designed to be projected onto a planetarium dome and was presented at the 2013 Sanford, Florida planetarium symposium. In 2016, LaLumiere students Camille Goethals and Oliver McNeil presented a simulation of the entire ring of the Large Hadron Collider at the Notre Dame DVT. To demonstrate the immense size of the LHC, the simulation compared the collider ring to the Notre Dame football stadium. In 2018, the QuarkNet DVT group traveled to France to make a presentation to the 24th International Planetarium Society conference in Toulouse, France. Students Fiona Hughes, Rose Kelly, and Julianna Meyer had worked on the DVT simulation of the LHC during their summer work at QuarkNet in 2017 and had presented the LHC model at the Live Interactive Planetarium Symposium held at Ball State University on July 18, 2017. The next summer, the students, along with QuarkNet and Notre Dame faculty members, traveled to the Toulouse conference to present the LHC model for conference attendees. The students posted YouTube videos about their experience. Fiona Hughes went on to obtain a bachelor's degree in chemical engineering from Purdue University in 2022, Julianna Mayer obtained a Bachelor of Arts degree in visual communication design and film from Notre Dame in 2022, and Rose Kelly was a rising freshman at the time of the conference planning to attend the University of California at Los Angeles to study philosophy and computer science.

=== International masterclass ===
In 2014, the Notre Dame QuarkNet Center received an $8,000 grant from Notre Dame International to establish particle physics collaborations between Notre Dame and educators in South America. Directed by Ken Cecire and Mitch Wayne, the Masterclass Institutes Collaborating in the Americas (MICA) program established a partnership between Notre Dame and the Pontifical Catholic University in Santiago, Chile. The collaboration would bring together high school students from Indiana and Chile through an online masterclass where participants would utilize real experimental data to become "particle physicists for a day". The students would interact via an online video conference to finish the day-long session. Cecire and Mooney traveled to Santiago to train physicists at the Pontifical Catholic University to administer the workshop. Jeremy Wegner of Winamac Community High School in Indiana and Jeff Chorny of Lakeshore High School in Michigan performed a complimentary cosmic ray experiment in the northern hemisphere during the workshop by driving from Indiana to Alabama with a portable cosmic ray detector. The masterclass was intended to establish a long-term partnership between the two universities.

=== Indiana University South Bend (IUSB): PICO and environmental sensors ===
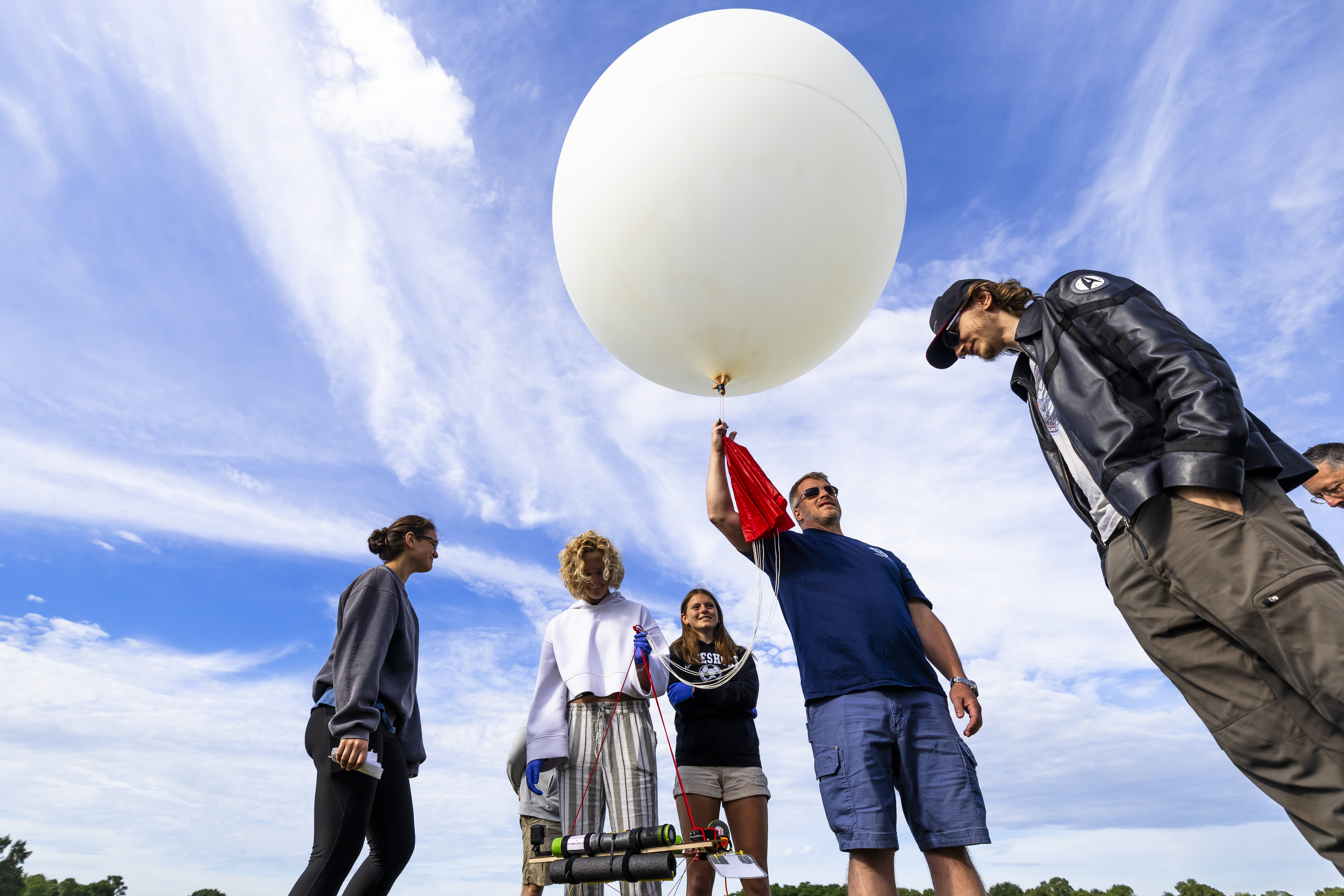
Notre Dame QuarkNet students participating in a balloon launch along with students and researchers from Indiana University South Bend, July 2024.

During the summer of 2015, the Notre Dame QuarkNet Center partnered with Indiana University South Bend (IUSB) to work on the PICO dark matter experiment. Two QuarkNet teachers and one QuarkNet student collaborated with Professor Ilan Levine to build acoustic sensors within the experiment's bubble chamber. PICO was designed to be sensitive to weakly interacting massive particles (WIMPs). These hypothetical particles are a leading candidate for the mysterious dark matter observed in space. The PICO detector was supported by National Science Foundation grants and the Kavli Institute for Cosmological Physics of the University of Chicago. The PICO detector is located 2 kilometers underground at the Canadian SNOLAB facility.

A collaboration between IUSB professor Brian Davis and the Notre Dame QuarkNet Center centered around building data loggers for environmental sensing. In July 2024, IUSB faculty and students along with a Notre Dame QuarkNet launched two weather balloons bearing multiple data loggers. QuarkNet high school students Mia Bradley (Lakeshore High School) and Sorel Miller (Bethany Christian Schools, Goshen, IN) worked on the environmental sensors project. Bradley stated, "We got to build some circuit boards and data loggers, which is a super opportunity, and we've also been learning how to program them and explore different ways to utilize them." According to IUSB professor Ilan Levine, the sensors were designed to measure the concentrations of particulates from automobiles and coal burning power plants in Indiana and to provide data on how these values change with elevation.

== 2020s ==
=== Reyniers Life Building ===
In 2019, the Notre Dame QuarkNet Center moved from its old location in the Aldi store located at Howard and Eddy Streets to the Reyniers Life Building on the Notre Dame campus. The old building complex, which also held Notre Dame's Robinson Community Learning Center and the Notre Dame Surplus Store, was demolished to make way for new construction. The Robinson Community Learning Center was moved to a new facility across the street. The Notre Dame QuarkNet Center had worked out of the old lab since 1999.

=== Cosmic rays ===
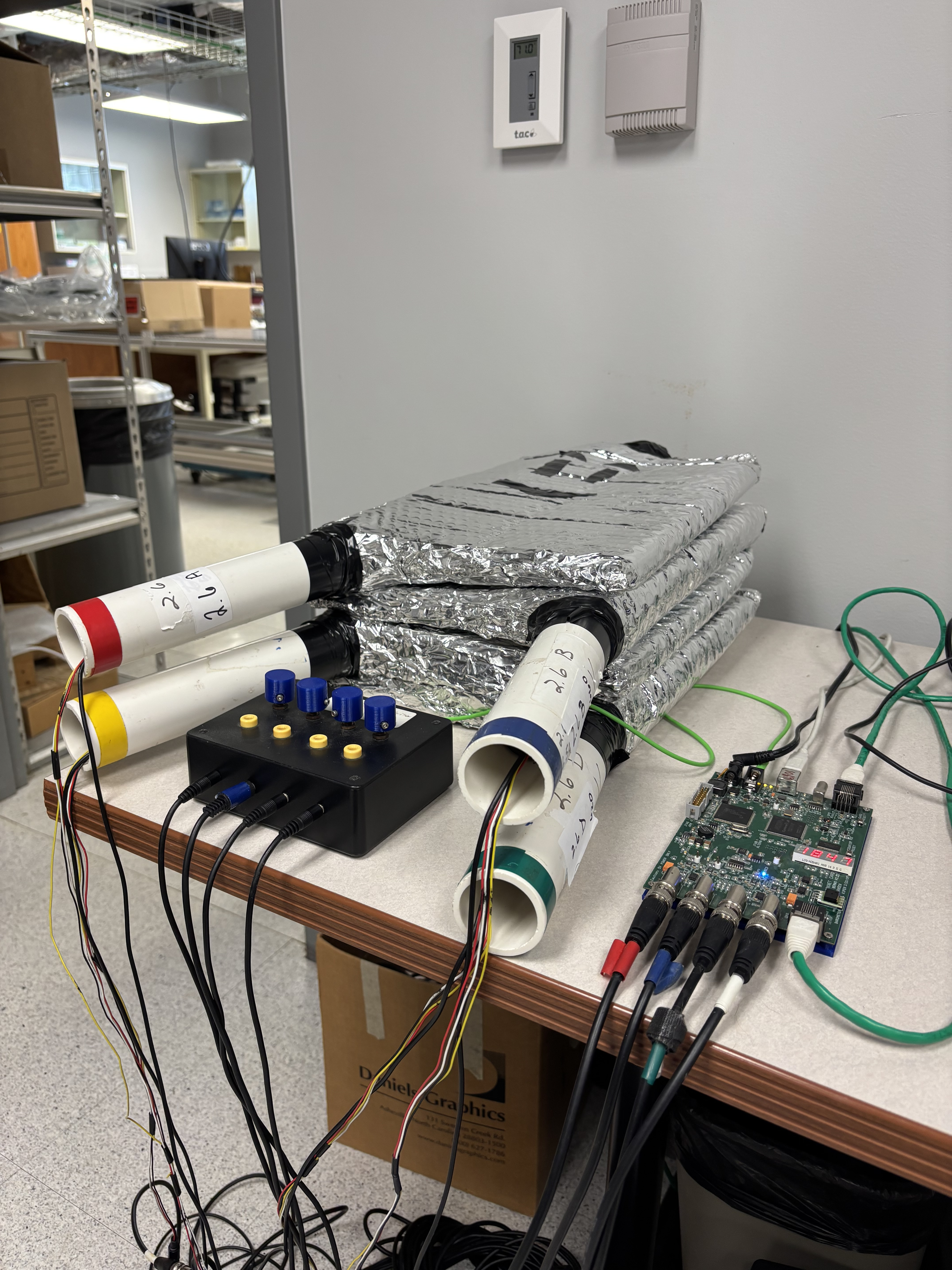
Notre Dame QuarkNet Center tabletop classroom cosmic ray detector.

In 2023, Kenneth Cecire spoke at the 38th International Cosmic Ray Conference (ICRC2023) in Nagoya, Japan. The talk detailed the building of Cosmic Watches at the Notre Dame QuarkNet Center. Invented by Spencer Axani of MIT, the Cosmic Watch is an inexpensive cosmic ray detector that can be utilized in high school and university physics classes. Before, the Notre Dame QuarkNet Center had a long-term project to build and test larger, tabletop size cosmic ray detectors for use in the classroom. In an effort provide less expensive units that could make up a class set of detectors, Notre Dame QuarkNet teacher Dan Kallenberg of Adams High School had spearheaded the construction of several Cosmic Watches during the summer of 2019. In 2020, just before the start of the COVID-19 pandemic, Cecire and Kallenberg, along with collaborator Joel Klammer, were part of an "Accel Kitchen" workshop held at the Hiroo Gakuen school in Tokyo where they performed Cosmic Watch experiments and demonstrations. In 2022, Kallenberg, with help from Senior Technician Daniel Ruggiero and summer students, built 48 Cosmic Watches that would be provided to local and national QuarkNet teachers for testing. Miki Ohtsuka, a visiting teacher from Waseda Honjo Senior High School in Japan, also contributed to the 2022 summer session and cosmic watch construction. In 2023, testing of the Cosmic Watches was performed by high school students Maggie Karban of the Trinity School at Greenlawn and Rowan McNeely of New Prairie High School in New Carlisle, Indiana. Testing involved using stacked Cosmic Watches in order to determine coincidence rates where both detectors are triggered, measuring the angle of particle hits from the zenith, and measuring cosmic ray hits when detectors are separated vertically. Other projects involved taking detectors and performing measurements on different floors of two buildings on the Notre Dame campus.

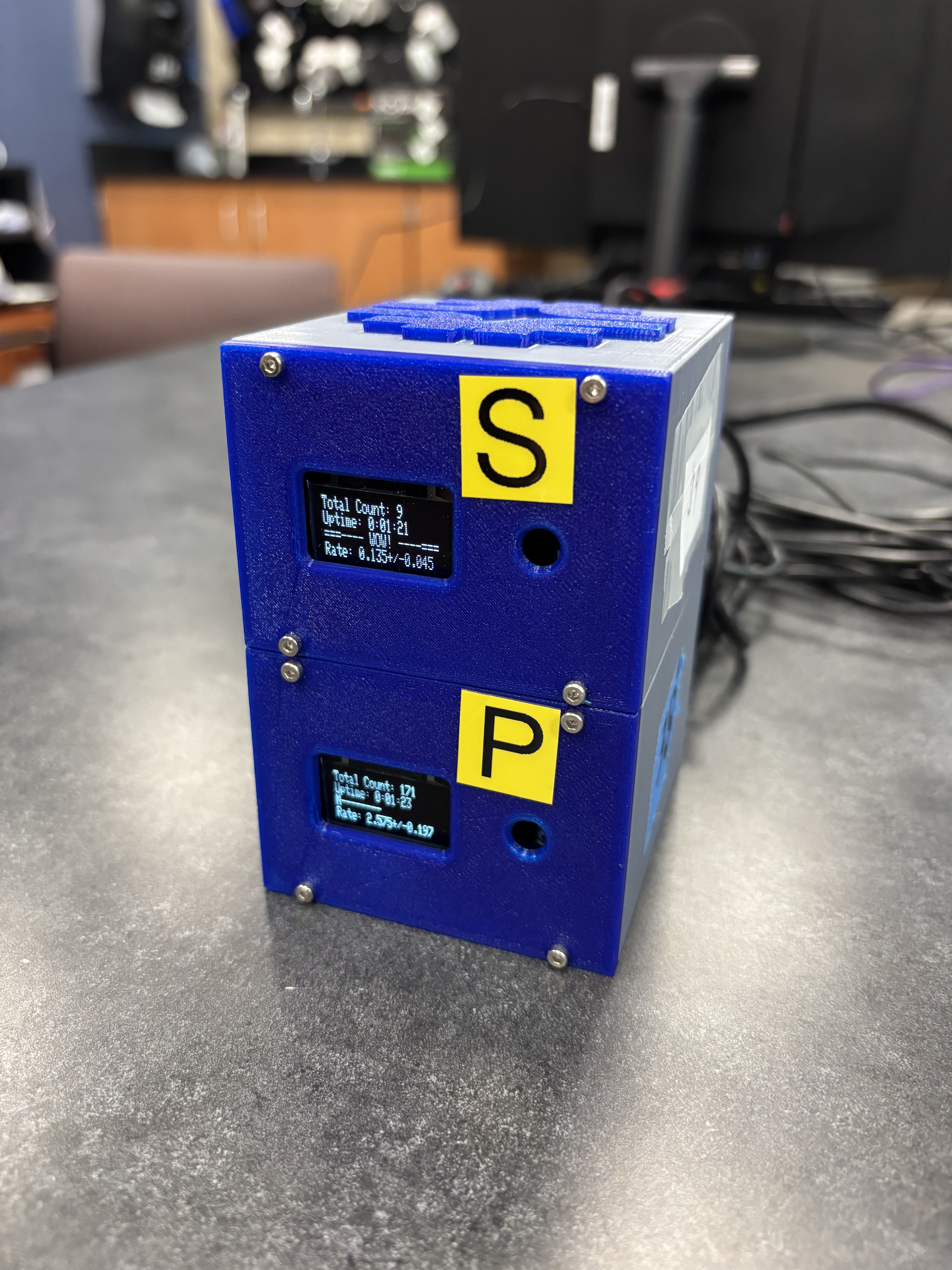
Cosmic Watches, cosmic ray detectors for classroom use.

=== ASP workshop ===
In 2024, the Notre Dame QuarkNet Center participated in the African School of Fundamental Physics and Applications (ASP) biennial workshop in Morocco. The ASP hosted about 80 African undergraduate and graduate students for a two-week workshop. Ken Cecire traveled to Morocco to help with the workshop. Cecire had meant to attend in 2020, but the COVID-19 pandemic had halted the trip. Cecire shared several hands-on demonstrations of particle physics and probability concepts. QuarkNet staff teacher Shane Wood recalled his participation in a recent ASP activity and how he was struck by the similarities and challenges of teaching students in Africa and the United States.

=== Post-2023 funding ===
QuarkNet funding was up for renewal in 2023. Mitch Wayne submitted a proposal to the National Science Foundation (NSF) in 2022 seeking to renew QuarkNet funding for another five-year period. In his January 2023 presentation to the QuarkNet Advisory Board Meeting, Wayne noted that the program had supported its teachers full time even during the COVID-19 pandemic. The NSF agreed to a three-year funding extension. According to the NSF program officer, reducing the program from five to three years was a "shot across the bow." The main issue was the perceived lack of discussion in the proposal to address issues of diversity, equity, and inclusion (DEI) among students and teachers in the QuarkNet program. At the May 2025 QuarkNet Advisory Board Meeting, a discussion was held concerning Trump administration cuts to NSF science education in-progress grants. In particular, the potential for 50% cuts in funding along with the viability of hosting QuarkNet for 2026 was addressed. If the 2026 year couldn't be funded, ways to "gracefully/effectively" close out the program were discussed. A reduced summer program for high school teachers and students was held at the QuarkNet Center in 2026. The NSF award description cites an end date of August 31, 2026, and the 2026 summer program may be the last.

In July, 2026, a letter was sent to QuarkNet teachers asking them to contact their elected representatives in the U.S. House of Representatives and the U.S. Senate and ask them to support the reinstatement of funding for the national QuarkNet program.

== See also ==
- Notre Dame College of Science
