= PolarTREC =

PolarTREC (Teachers and Researchers Exploring and Collaborating) is a program for K-12 teachers to participate in field research in the polar regions in order to improve their knowledge of polar science and expand the reach of current scientific research beyond the scientific community. Teachers involved in PolarTREC spend about two to six weeks at their polar sites, collaborating with scientific research teams and connecting with students and the public via online media. PolarTREC is funded by the National Science Foundation and managed by the Arctic Research Consortium.

== Overview ==
The purpose of PolarTREC is to stimulate polar science education and awareness.

== Expeditions ==
Notable past PolarTREC expeditions include:

•Carbon Balance in Warming and Drying Tundra (2013), which studied the effects of warming and drying on tundra carbon balance

•Airborne Survey of Polar Ice (2013), a six-year NASA mission, which is the largest airborne survey of Earth's polar ice ever conducted

•Tectonic History of the Transantartic Mountains (2012), which deciphered the tectonic history of the Transantarctic Mountains and the Wilkes Subglacial Basin

•Greenland Education Tour (2012), part of an initiative to foster enhanced international scientific cooperation between Greenland and the US

•In 2011, PolarTREC teacher John Wood lived in a tent at the top of Mount Erebus, an active volcano in Antarctica. The average temperature was -20 F.

== Teacher experience ==
Teachers must apply to the program and only the top 100 applications make it to the PolarTREC selection committee. Researcher also must apply and be selected as a PolarTREC research team. After researchers are selected, a selection of the top 30-40 teacher applications are sent to the various research teams. Researchers select which of the teachers to interview, after which they invite a teacher to join the team. There are usually 12 research teams—6 in the Arctic and 6 in the Antarctic—so out of the over 200 applicants each year only 12 get chosen.

Once accepted PolarTREC covers the costs of the expedition. The teachers are given special training through webinars and a week long orientation in Fairbanks, Alaska. While on the trip teachers are expected to communicate through the Virtual Home Base and give updates using message boards, photo albums, podcasts, "PolarConnect" events and presentations from the field. Using the message boards and journals, teachers can document what the students get excited about and how they learn. This data can be used to shape science curriculum. Teachers are encouraged to share their experiences with a wider audience by writing articles and speaking at conferences. Teachers also encouraged to develop lessons based on their expedition for the Learning Resources section of the website.

== See also ==
Arctic exploration

Research Experiences for Teachers
