= Research Experiences for Teachers =

Research Experiences for Teachers (RET) is a National Science Foundation (NSF) program designed to improve science educators by exposing them to research. The program is closely modeled after the NSF Research Experiences for Undergraduates program. Several NSF directorates have their own RET programs including the Directorate of Biological Sciences (BIO), the Directorate for Engineering (ENG), and the Directorate of Computer Information Science and Engineering (CISE). The later two form a joint RET program. Like many NSF programs, the RET program especially encourages the participation of educators from underrepresented groups. In addition, the NSF encourages potential RET host sites to seek out teachers from impoverished school districts.

== Directorate of Biological Sciences (BIO) RET Program ==
The NSF BIO RET program is designed to increase the knowledge of K-12 science educators. One major objective of the BIO RET program is to encourage participants to incorporate their research skills into their class structures. The BIO RET program is intended to support up to two teachers per host site at any given time.

== Directorates of Engineering and Computer Information Science and Engineering (ENG/CISE) RET Program ==
The NSF ENG/CISE RET program is designed to increase the general knowledge and research skills of science educators. However, unlike the BIO RET program, the ENG/CISE RET program will support community college professors in addition to K-12 educators. Also, in contrast to the BIO RET program, the ENG/CISE RET program encourages host institutions to recruit no less than two teachers at a given time. Funding for any RET host institution may not exceed $500,000 over three years and may not exceed $10,000 per teacher. In accordance the NSF's concern for ethics, $4,000 per year may be granted to support ethics training. The ENG/CISE allocated $5,500,000 for the fiscal year 2011 to support RETs.

Participating educators are provided with a stipend and may be reimbursed for travel and living expenses.

== See also ==
Research Experiences for Undergraduates

PolarTREC
