= QuarkNet =

Teacher professional development in sciences

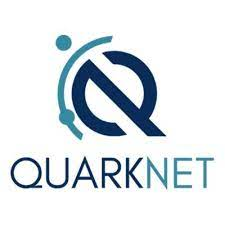
QuarkNet logo

QuarkNet is a long-term, research-based teacher professional development program in the United States jointly funded by the National Science Foundation and the US Department of Energy. Since 1999, QuarkNet has established centers at universities and national laboratories conducting research in particle physics (also called high-energy physics) across the United States, and has been bringing such physics to high school classrooms. QuarkNet programs are described in the National Research Council National Science Education Standards report (1995) and support the Next Generation Science Standards (2013).

== Overview ==
=== Boot Camp ===
The summer Boot Camp is an annual national activity allowing teachers to see detectors and colliders, as well as form research groups to process experimental data. Teachers have been working in separate groups investigating triggers released by CMS since early 2011. The groups search the data for evidence of the J/Psi, Z and W bosons. They used Excel to reconstruct the invariant mass of a particle when given the four-vector of that particle's decay products. In addition, participants attend several talks and tours of technical areas.

=== Cosmic ray studies ===
The main QuarkNet student investigations supported at the national level are cosmic ray studies. Working with Fermilab technicians and research physicists, QuarkNet staff have developed a classroom cosmic ray muon detector that uses the same technologies as the largest detectors at Fermilab and CERN. To support inter school collaboration, QuarkNet collaborates with the Interactions in Understanding the Universe Project (I2U2) to develop and support the Cosmic Ray e-Lab. An e-Lab is a student-led, teacher-guided investigation using experimental data. Students have an opportunity to organize and conduct authentic research and experience the environment of a scientific collaboration. Participating schools set up a detector somewhere at the school. Students collect and upload the data to a central server located at Argonne National Laboratory. Students can access data from detectors in the cluster for use in studies, such as determining the (mean) lifetime of muons, the overall flux of muons in cosmic rays, or a study of extended air showers.

== Fellowships & programs ==
In summer 2007, QuarkNet inaugurated the QuarkNet Fellows Program to develop the leadership potential of teachers who would work with staff to provide professional development activities and support for centers. Three groups of fellows in the areas of cosmic ray studies, LHC and teaching and learning share responsibilities for offering workshops and sessions, developing workshop materials, supporting e-Labs and masterclasses, giving presentations at AAPT and more. In 2009, a new group of fellows joined the program. Leadership fellows work with staff to support centers and gather data about center performance.

=== Masterclass ===
Since 2007, QuarkNet has hosted a one-day national program for students called Masterclass, initially studying Large Electron–Positron Collider-era CERN data, and now studying ALICE, ATLAS or CMS data. In addition to analysis of data, the day offers lectures and the opportunity to discuss results.

=== Summer Student Research Program ===
Based on a model at the University of Notre Dame, QuarkNet has offered a summer student research program since 2004. Typically, teams of four high school students supervised by one teacher spend six weeks involved in various physics research projects. Some centers choose to modify this model, involving more students and/or less time. The research is associated with ATLAS and CMS, the International Linear Collider R&D, cosmic ray muon detectors, optical fiber R&D and more. Teams are supported at up to 25 centers each summer. Examples of recent research titles include Search and Identification of Comparing the Amount of Muon Events to Daily Weather Changes, Cosmic Ray Signals in Radar Echo, Fibers for Forward Calorimeter, The Effects of Impurities on Radio Signal Detection in Ice, Quartz Plate Calorimetry, Galactic Asymmetry of the Milky Way and RF Magnet Design, and Weak Lensing Mass Estimates of the Elliot Arc Cluster.
